= 1430s in art =

- 1420s
- 1430s in art
- 1440s

Art timeline

The decade of the 1430s in art involved some significant events.

== Events ==
- 1430: Sometimes considered end of Medieval art period in Italy.
- 1430s: Start of European printmaking as the engraver known as the Master of the Playing Cards becomes active in south-western Germany and Switzerland.
- 1435: Leon Battista Alberti writes Della Pittura.
- 1438–1440: Donatello completes his series of sculptures for the Cathedral of Prato.

== Works ==
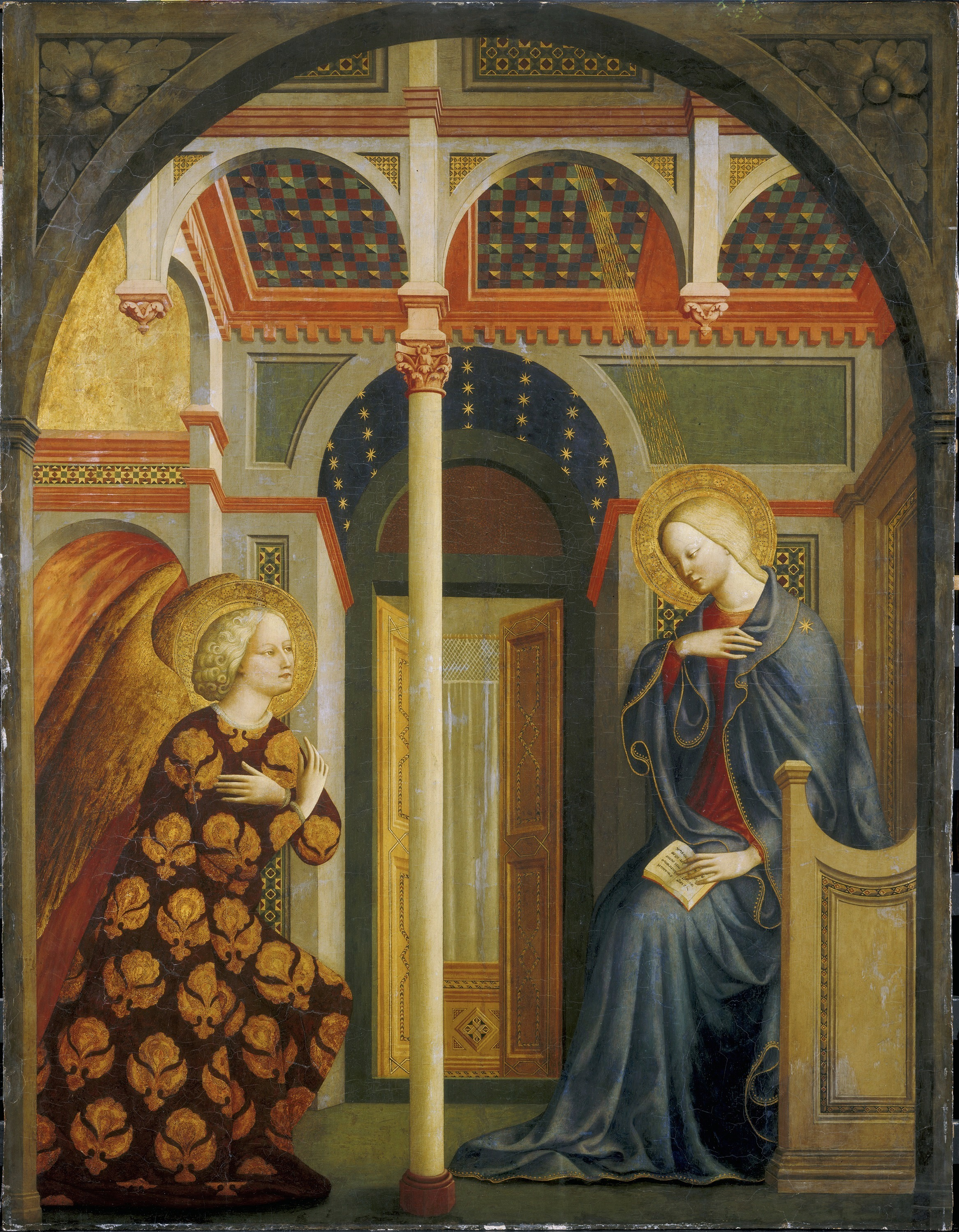
Masolino da Panicale, The Annunciation (1425–30)

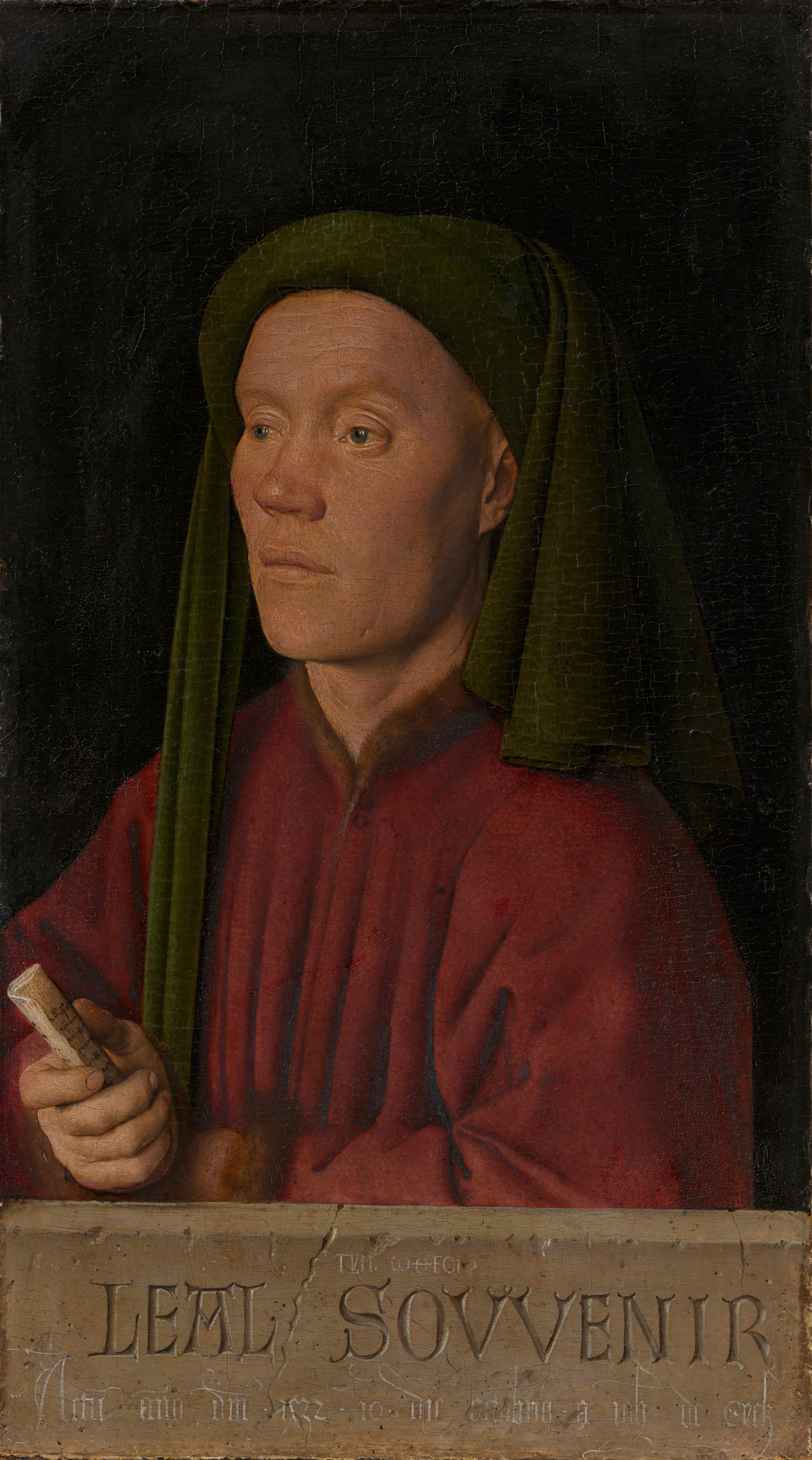
Jan van Eyck, Léal Souvenir (1432)

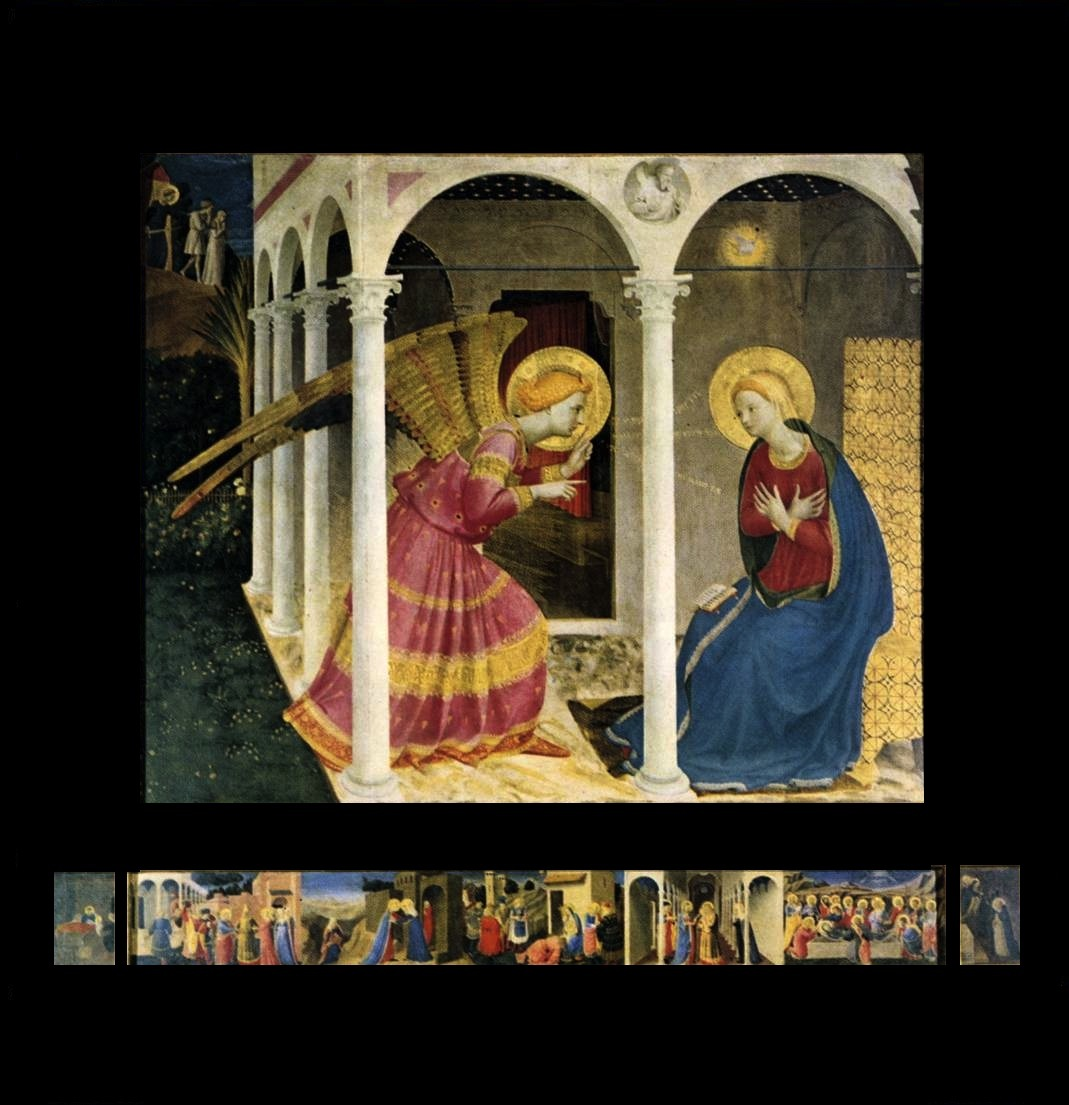
Fra Angelico, Annunciation of Cortona (1432-4)

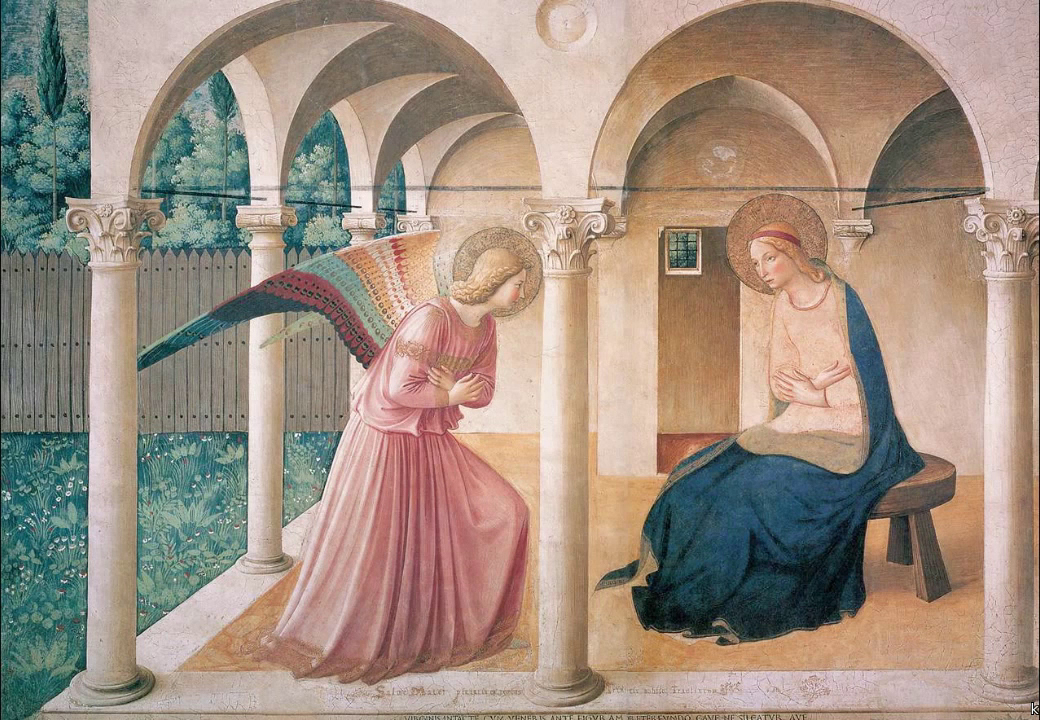
Fra Angelico, The Annunciation (San Marco, Florence) (c.1437-1446)

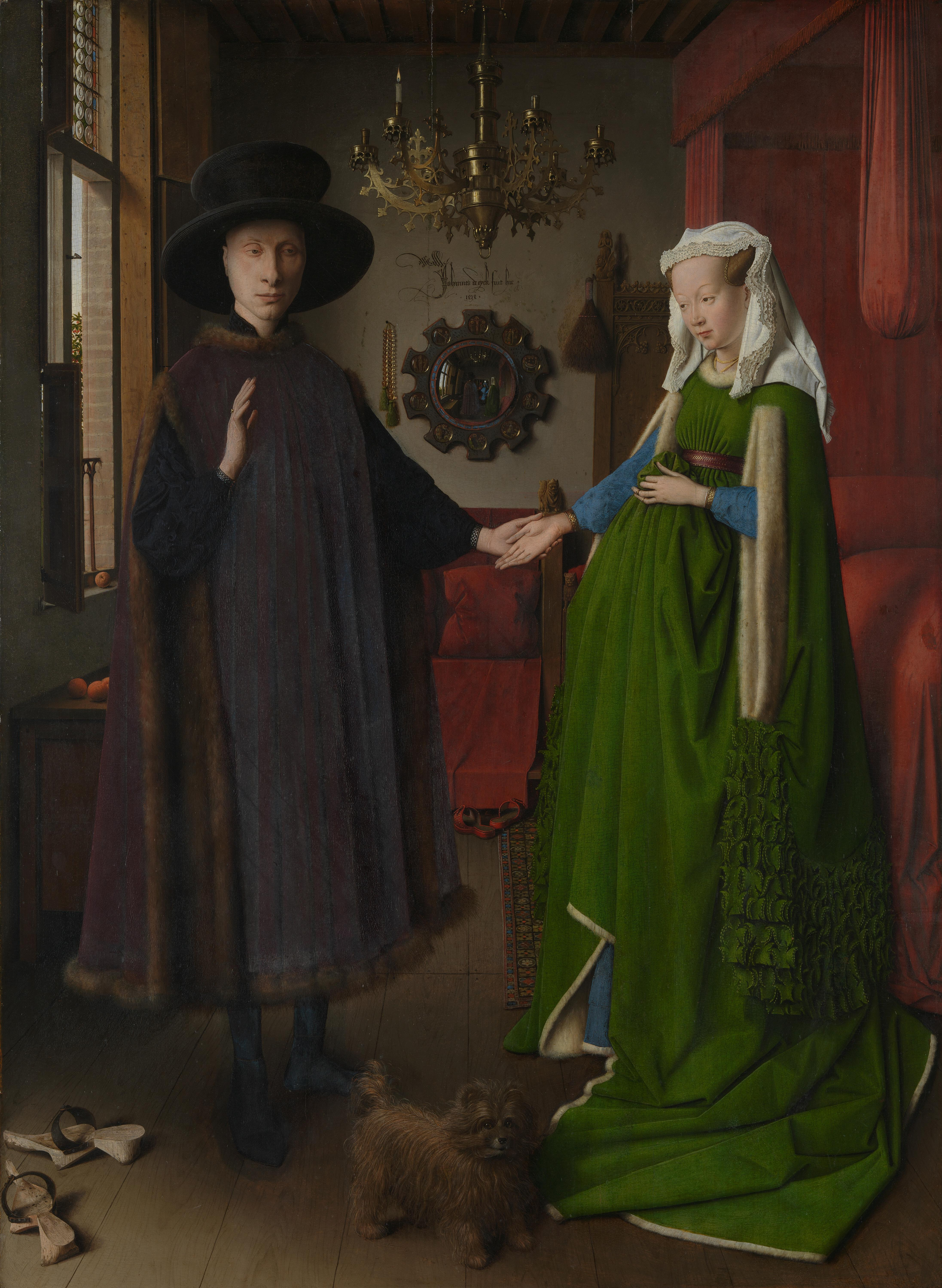
Jan van Eyck, Arnolfini Portrait (1434)

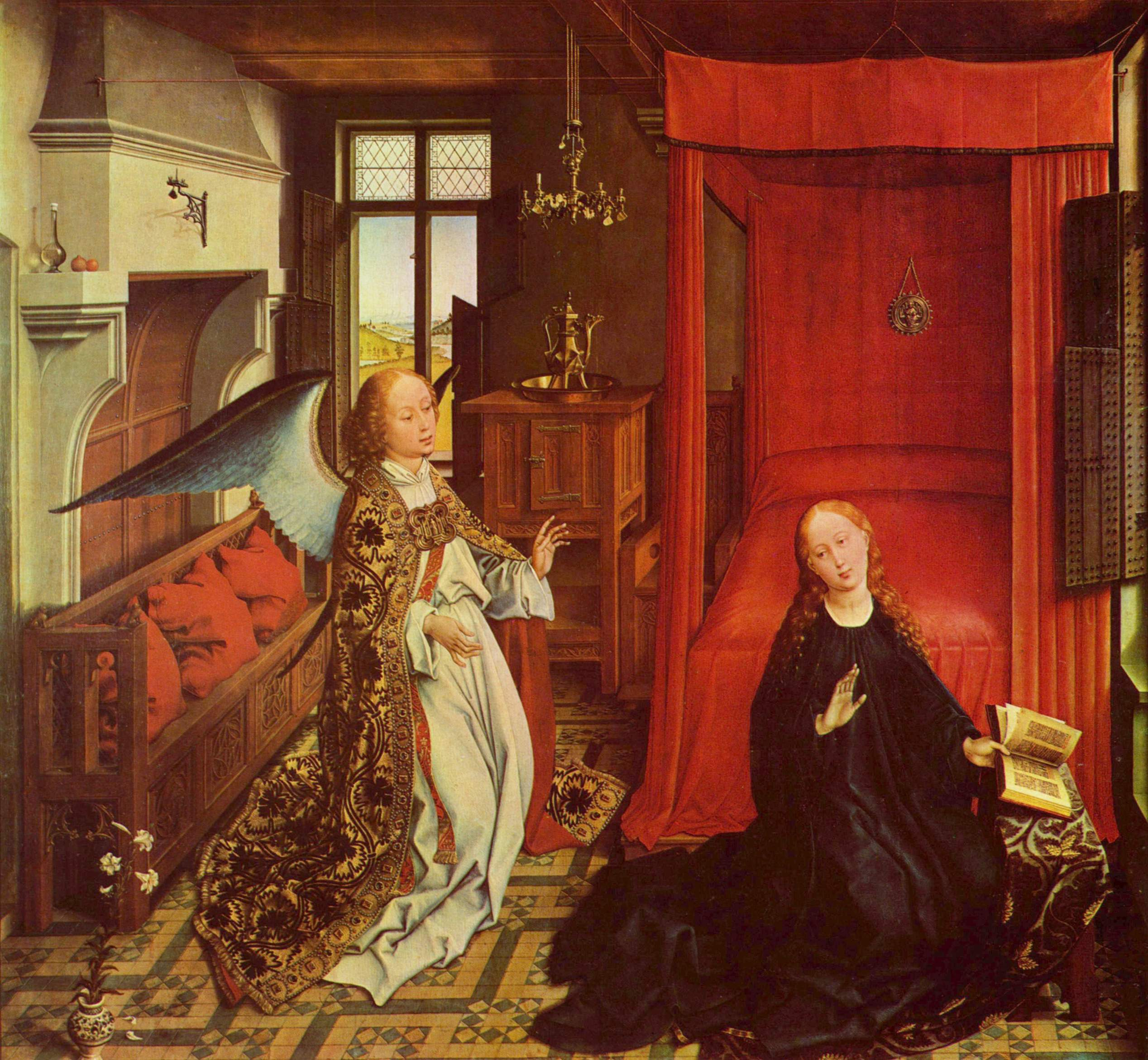
van der Weyden, The Annunciation (c.1435-1440)

=== Paintings ===
- 1425–1430: Masolino da Panicale – The Annunciation (National Gallery of Art, Washington, D.C.)
- 1428–1432: Jan van Eyck (attrib.) – Saint Francis Receiving the Stigmata (2 versions)
- c.1430
  - Domenico di Bartolo – Madonna and Child Enthroned with Saint Peter and Saint Paul (National Gallery of Art, Washington, D.C.)
  - Jan van Eyck (attrib.) – Portrait of a Man with a Blue Chaperon
- c.1430–1432
  - Fra Angelico – The Annunciation (for Convent of San Domenico, Fiesole; now Museo del Prado, Madrid)
  - Stefano di Giovanni – Madonna of the Snows Altarpiece (Uffizi, Florence)
- c.1430–1440: Jan van Eyck – Crucifixion and Last Judgement diptych (Metropolitan Museum of Art, New York)
- 1432: Jan van Eyck
  - Ghent Altarpiece
  - Léal Souvenir
- 1432–1434: Fra Angelico – Annunciation of Cortona completed in Florence
- 1433:
  - Domenico di Bartolo – Madonna of Humility
  - Rogier van der Weyden (attrib.) – Virgin and Child Enthroned (Thyssen-Bornemisza Museum, Madrid)
  - Jan van Eyck – Portrait of a Man (Self Portrait?)
- 1434: Jan van Eyck – Arnolfini Portrait
- c.1434: Stefano di Giovanni
  - Madonna of Humility with Saints (Triptych)
  - San Domenico da Cortona Polyptych
- c.1434–1436: Jan van Eyck – The Annunciation (National Gallery of Art, Washington, D.C.)
- c.1434–1446: Workshop of Rogier van der Weyden – The Annunciation (Musée du Louvre)
- 1435–1438: Rogier van der Weyden – The Magdalen Reading
- c.1435–1440: Rogier van der Weyden (attrib.) – Saint Luke Drawing the Virgin
- 1435: Stefano di Giovanni – The Journey of the Magi (Metropolitan Museum of Art, New York)
- c.1435
  - Jan van Eyck – Madonna of Chancellor Rolin
  - Konrad Witz – Heilspiegel Altarpiece and St. Christopher
- 1436
  - Paolo Uccello – Funerary Monument to Sir John Hawkwood (fresco painting, Florence Cathedral)
  - Jan van Eyck – The Madonna with Canon van der Paele (Groeningemuseum)
- 1437: Domenico di Bartolo – Virgin and Child (Philadelphia Museum of Art)
- c.1437
  - Stefano di Giovanni – Polyptych of St. Anthony the Abbot (Cortona)
  - Jan van Eyck – Lucca Madonna
- c.1437–1438: Fra Angelico – Perugia Altarpiece
- c.1437–1444: Stefano di Giovanni
  - Ecstasy of Saint Francis (Villa i Tatti, Settignano)
  - Saint Francis Receiving Stigmata (National Gallery, London)
- c.1437–1446: Fra Angelico – The Annunciation (San Marco, Florence)
- 1438: Domenico di Bartolo – Polyptych of Santa Giuliana (Galleria Nazionale dell'Umbria, Perugia)
- c.1438–1440: Jan van Eyck – Madonna in the Church
- 1439: Jan van Eyck – Portrait of Margareta van Eyck (Groeningemuseum)

=== Sculpture ===
- c.1425–1466: Donatello – David (bronze; Bargello, Florence)
- c. 1430 – Donatello – Dovizia (Mercato Vecchio lost)
- 1431–1438: Luca della Robbia – Cantoria (carved singing loft, Florence Cathedral)
- c.1435: Lorenzo Ghiberti – Gates of Paradise (bronze panels; doors of Florence Baptistery)
- 1438: Donatello – St. John the Baptist (wood, Santa Maria Gloriosa dei Frari, Venice)

== Births ==
- 1430: Michel Colombe – French sculptor (died 1513)
- 1430: Jean Colombe – French miniature painter and illuminator of manuscripts (died 1493)
- 1430: Desiderio da Settignano – Italian sculptor (died 1464)
- 1430: Vincenzo Foppa – Italian painter (died 1515)
- 1430: Matteo di Giovanni – Italian Renaissance artist from the Sienese School (died 1495)
- 1430: Francesco Laurana – Dalmatian-born sculptor and medallist (died 1502)
- 1430: Pier Antonio Mezzastris – Italian painter of the Umbrian school of painting (died 1506)
- 1430: Fra Diamante – Italian fresco painter (died 1498)
- 1430: Carlo Crivelli – Italian Renaissance painter of conservative Late Gothic decorative sensibility (died 1495)
- 1430: Antonello da Messina – Sicilian painter (died 1479)
- 1430: Hans Memling – Early Netherlandish painter (died 1494)
- 1430: Giovanni Bellini – Italian painter (died 1516)
- 1430: Simone Papa the Elder – Italian painter (died 1480)
- 1430: Cosimo Tura – Italian painter and one of the founders of the School of Ferrara (died 1495)
- 1430: Di Biagio Baldassarre del Firenze – Italian Renaissance painter of the Florentine School (died 1484)
- 1431: Shingei – Japanese painter and artist of the Muromachi period (died 1485)
- 1431: Andrea Mantegna – Italian Renaissance artist (died 1506)
- 1433: Felice Feliciano – Italian calligrapher, composer of alchemical sonnets and expert on Roman antiquity (died 1479)
- 1433: Marco Zoppo – Italian painter active mainly in Bologna (died 1498)
- 1434: Kanō Masanobu – Japanese chief painter of the Ashikaga shogunate and founder of the Kanō school of painting (died 1530)
- 1434: Tosa Mitsunobu – Japanese painter and founder of the Tosa school of painting (died 1525)
- 1434: Michael Wolgemut – German painter and printmaker (died 1519)
- 1435: Andrea del Verrocchio – influential Italian sculptor, goldsmith and painter working at the court of Lorenzo de' Medici in Florence (died 1488)
- 1435: Pietro Lombardo – Italian sculptor and architect (died 1515)
- 1435: Michael Pacher – Austrian Tyrolean painter and sculptor (died 1498)
- 1435: Andrea della Robbia – Italian sculptor, especially in ceramics (died 1525)
- 1435: Bartolomeo Sanvito – Paduan calligrapher (died 1518)
- 1435: Nicolas Froment – French painter (died 1486)
- 1435: Bernt Notke – German painter and sculptor (died 1508/1509)
- 1435: Giovanni Santi – Italian painter, poet and father of Raphael (died 1494)
- 1435: Jan Polack – Polish-born German painter (died 1519)
- 1435/1440: Bertoldo di Giovanni – Italian sculptor (died 1491)
- 1436: Baccio Baldini – Italian engraver in Florence (died 1487)
- 1436: Benvenuto di Giovanni – Italian artist, manuscripts (died 1509/1517)
- 1436: Sheikh Hamdullah – Ottoman master of Islamic calligraphy (died 1520)
- 1436: Ni Duan – Imperial Chinese painter of people and landscapes (died 1505)
- 1437: Simone Ferrucci – Italian sculptor (died 1493)
- 1438: Melozzo da Forlì – Italian fresco painter and member of the Forlì painting school (died 1494)
- 1439: Cosimo Rosselli – Italian painter of the Quattrocento, active mainly in Florence (died 1507)
- 1439: Domenico Rosselli – Italian sculptor (died 1498)
- 1439: Francesco di Giorgio – Italian painter of the Sienese School, sculptor, architect, art theorist and military engineer (died 1502)

== Deaths ==
- 1430: Andrei Rublev – the greatest medieval Russian painter of icons and frescos (born 1360–1370)
- 1430: Daniil Chyorny – Russian icon painter (born 1360)
- 1430: Madern Gerthener – German late Gothic stonemason, sculptor and architect (born 1360/1370)
- 1431: Li Zai – Chinese painter of landscapes and human figures during the Ming Dynasty (born unknown)
- 1435: Zhu Zhanji, Xuande Emperor – Emperor of China who was also a painter, especially of animals (born 1398)
- 1437: Pellegrino di Giovanni – Italian painter (born unknown)
- 1438: Jacopo della Quercia – Italian sculptor of the Italian Renaissance (born 1374)
- 1439: Jacobello del Fiore – Italian quattrocento painter (born 1370)
