= 1518 in art =

Events from the year 1518 in art.

== Events ==
- Titian begins painting The Worship of Venus (Madrid, Museo del Prado) during 1518-1519 and completes his large Assumption of the Virgin (1516-1518) for the altar of Santa Maria Gloriosa dei Frari in Venice, his first major commission in the city.
- Bernard van Orley probably makes four tapestry cartoons for the Legend of Our Lady on the Zavel during 1516-1518.

== Paintings ==
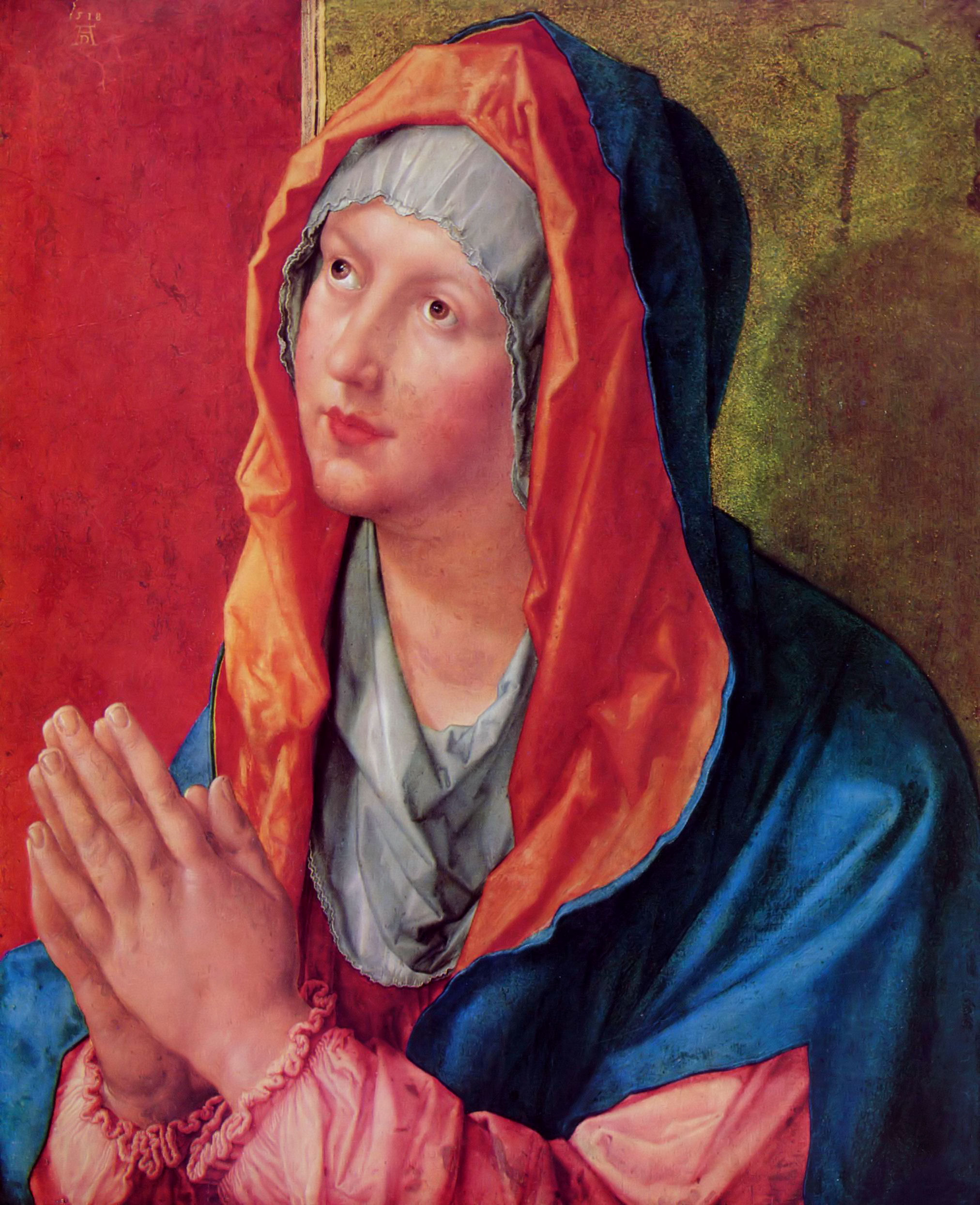
Dürer – Maria Praying, Gemäldegalerie, Berlin

- Albrecht Altdorfer - Sebastian Altar in St. Florian's Priory, Sankt Florian, near Linz, Upper Austria
- Albrecht Dürer - Maria Praying
- Adriaen Isenbrandt
  - Bröhmse triptych with Adoration of the Magi (St. Mary's Church, Lübeck; destroyed 1942)
  - Portrait of Paulus de Nigro
- Raphael (some dates approximate)
  - Ezekiel's Vision
  - Self-portrait with a friend
  - St. Michael Vanquishing Satan
  - The Holy Family of Francis I
- Titian - Assumption of the Virgin

== Births ==
- September 29 – Tintoretto (real name Jacopo Comin), Italian painter of the Venetian school and probably the last great painter of the Italian Renaissance (died 1594)
- date unknown
  - Antonio Badile, Italian painter from Verona (died 1560)
  - Hieronymus Cock, Flemish painter, etcher and publisher of prints (died 1570)
  - Étienne Delaune, French engraver and goldsmith (died 1595)
  - Mayken Verhulst, Flemish miniature, tempera and watercolor painter (died 1599)
  - Marx Weiß, German Gothic painter (died 1580)

== Deaths ==
- January 5 (or 1517) – Francesco Raibolini known as Francesco Francia, Italian painter, goldsmith, and medallist (born 1450)
- date unknown
  - Lorenzo Fasolo, Lombard painter (born 1463)
  - Francisco Henriques, Flemish Renaissance painter active in Portugal (b. unknown)
  - Guido Mazzoni, Italian sculptor and painter (born 1445)
  - Domenico Morone, Italian painter from Verona (born 1442)
  - Rodrigo de Osona - Spanish Renaissance painter (born 1440)
  - Bartolomeo Sanvito, calligrapher (born 1435)
