= 1516 in art =

Events from the year 1516 in art.

== Events ==
- Leonardo da Vinci moves to France and enters the service of King Francis I of France, being given the use of the manor house Clos Lucé connected via tunnel to the king's residence at the Château d'Amboise. He probably brings the Mona Lisa with him.

== Works ==
Leonardo – St. John the Baptist

- Fra Bartolomeo
  - Pietà
  - Scene with Christ in the Temple
- Hieronymus Bosch – Christ Carrying the Cross
- Cima da Conegliano
  - St Lanfranc enthroned between St John the Baptist and St Liberius
  - St Peter Enthroned with St John the Baptist and St Paul (Pinacoteca di Brera, Milan)
- Innocenzo di Pietro Francucci da Imola – The Virgin and Child with Saints John, Apollinaris and Catherine and a Bishop
- Leonardo da Vinci – St. John the Baptist
- Matthias Grünewald – Isenheim Altarpiece (completed, with sculptures by Nikolaus Hagenauer)
- Lorenzo Lotto – Martinengo Altarpiece (Church of Santi Bartolomeo e Stefano, Bergamo)
- Michelangelo – Dying Slave (marble)
- Pontormo
  - Madonna with Child and Saints (approximate date)
  - Visitation of the Virgin and St Elizabeth (fresco in Santissima Annunziata, Florence, completed)
- Raphael
  - Cartoons of scenes from the Gospels and Acts of the Apostles for tapestries for the Sistine Chapel (Victoria and Albert Museum, London)
  - Portrait of Cardinal Bibbiena
  - Portrait of Andrea Navagero and Agostino Beazzano
- Titian – The Tribute Money

== Births ==
- February 16 - Prospero Spani, Italian sculptor (died 1584)
- date unknown
  - Antonio Bernieri, Italian painter (died 1565)
  - Cristóvão Lopes, Portuguese portrait and altarpiece painter (died 1594)
  - Domenico Riccio, Italian painter in a Mannerist style from Verona (died 1567)

== Deaths ==
- June 1 - Biagio d'Antonio, Italian painter (born 1446)
- August 9 (bur.) – Hieronymus Bosch, Early Netherlandish painter of the 15th and 16th centuries (born c.1450)
- c. November 26? - Giovanni Bellini, Venetian Renaissance painter (born c.1430)
- date unknown
  - Giuliano da Sangallo, Florentine sculptor and architect (born c.1443)
  - Jacopo de' Barbari, Italian painter and printmaker (born 1440)
  - Antonio del Massaro, Italian Quattrocento painters (born c. 1450)
  - Giovanni Antonio Boltraffio, Italian painter of the High Renaissance who worked in the studio of Leonardo da Vinci (born 1466/1467)
  - Antonio Lombardo, Italian sculptor (born 1458)
