= 1506 in art =

Events from the year 1506 in art.

== Events ==
- 14 January - The classical statue of Laocoön and His Sons is unearthed in a vineyard near the site of the Domus Aurea of the Roman emperor Nero and the Basilica di Santa Maria Maggiore in Rome. On the recommendation of Giuliano da Sangallo and Michelangelo, Pope Julius II purchases it and places it on public display in the Vatican a month later.
- Francesco Raibolini becomes a court painter in Mantua.

== Works ==
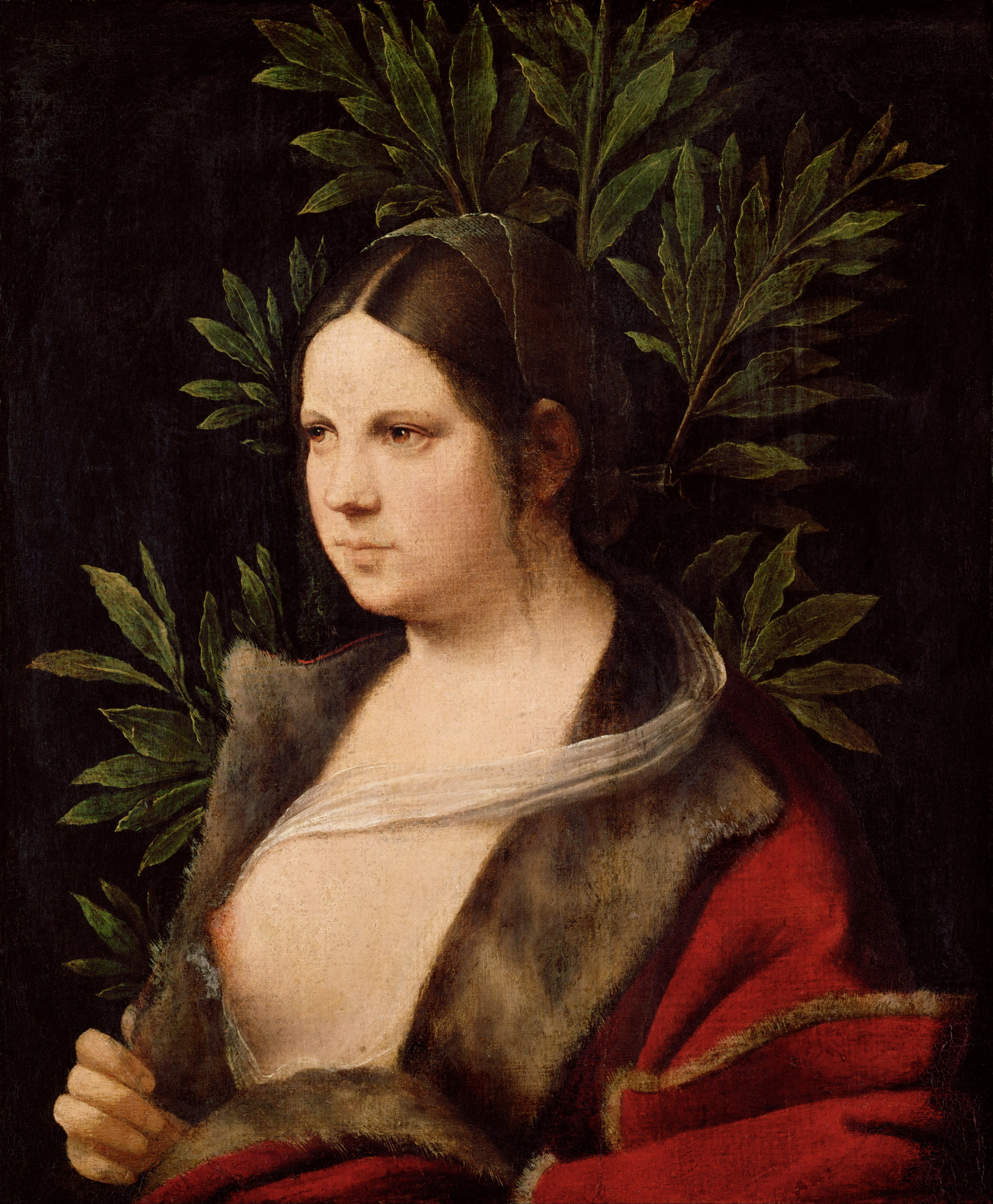
Giorgione, Laura

Leonardo da Vinci, Mona Lisa

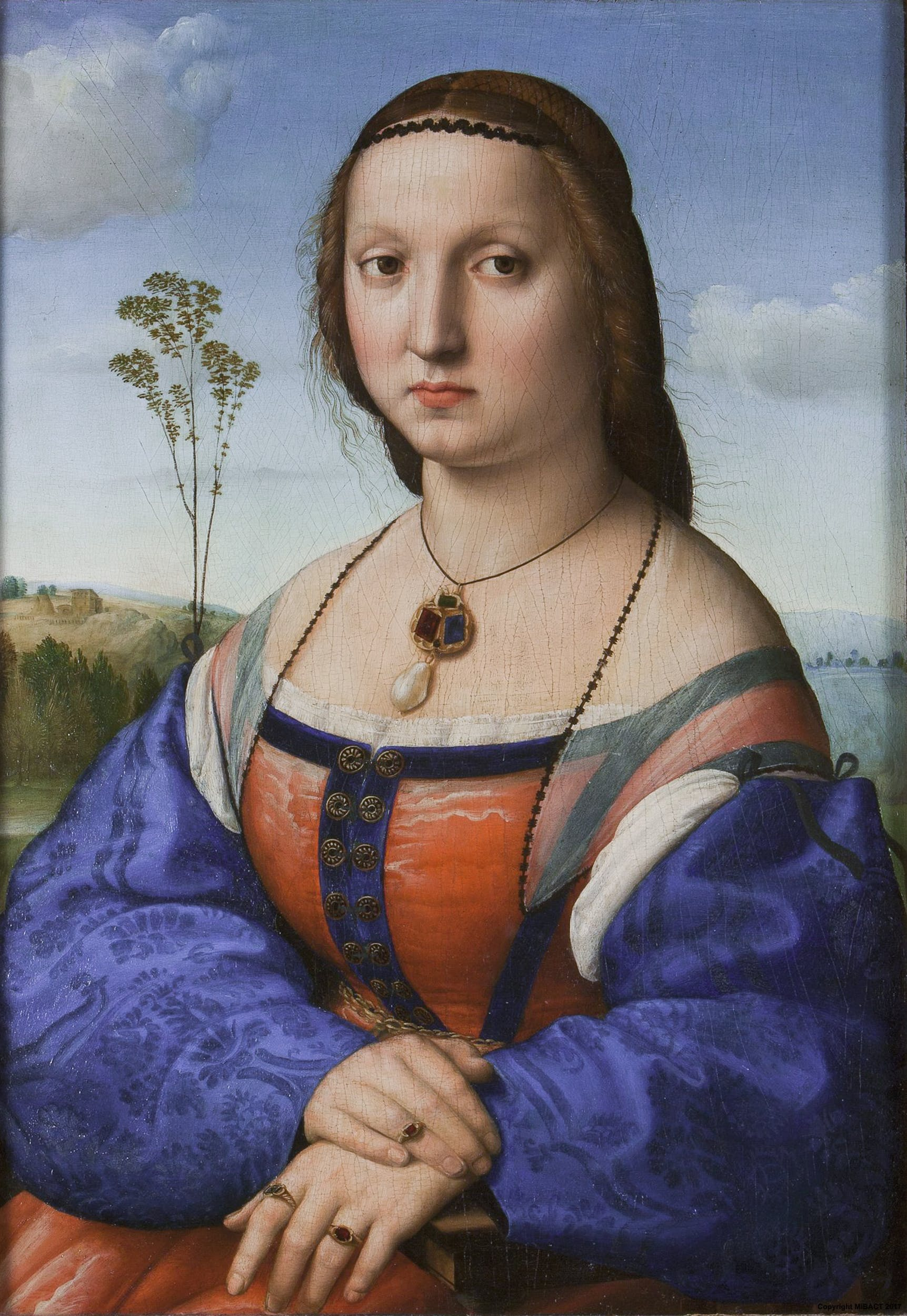
Raphael, Portrait of Maddalena Doni

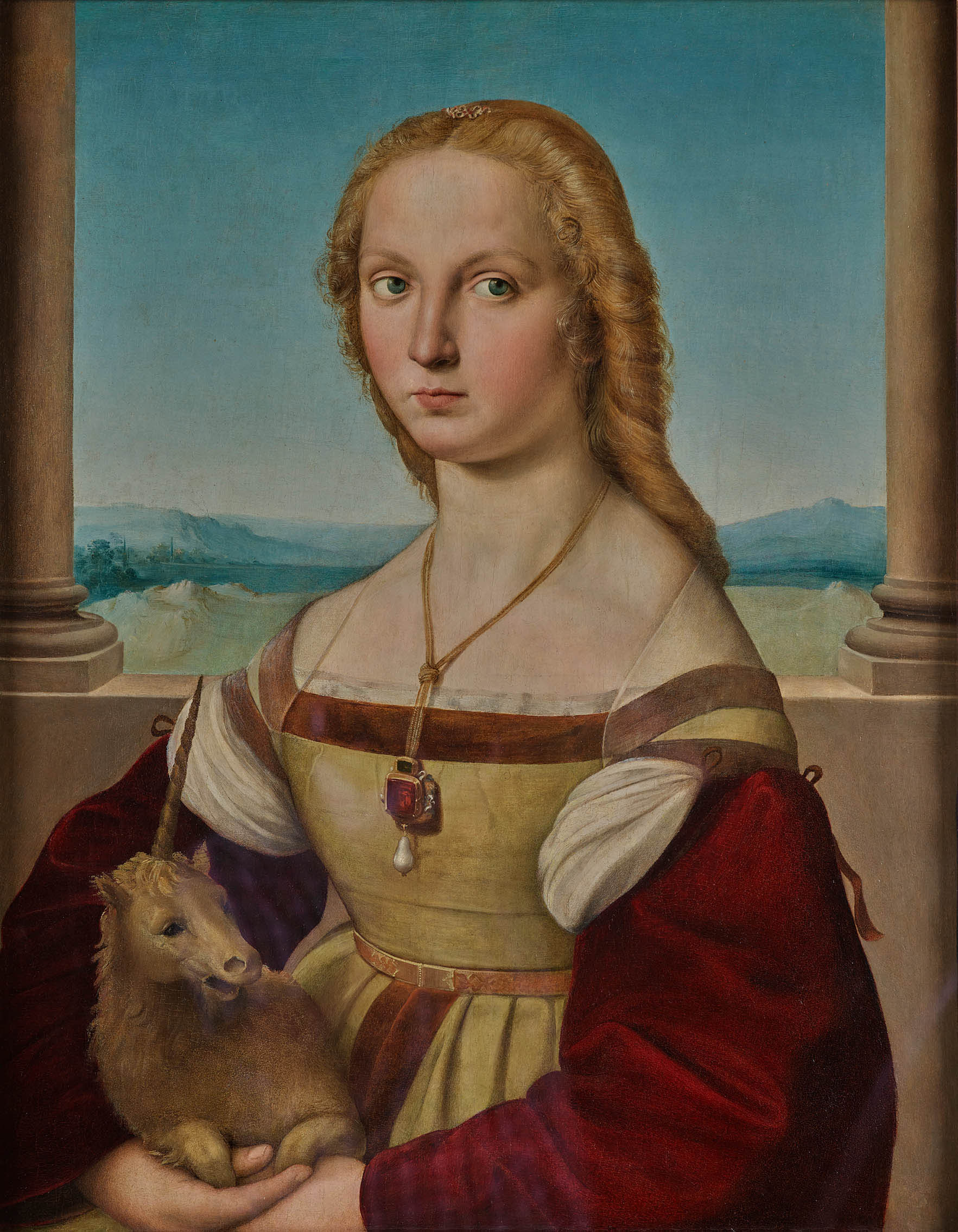
Raphael, Young Woman with Unicorn

=== Painting ===
- Giorgione
  - Laura (Portrait of a Young Bride)
  - Young Man with Arrow (approximate date)
- Leonardo da Vinci – Mona Lisa
- Raphael
  - Madonna del cardellino
  - Portrait of Maddalena Doni
  - Young Woman with Unicorn
- Albrecht Dürer – Portrait of a Young Woman

== Births ==
- April 13 - Peter Faber (or Pierre Favre), French Jesuit painter and sculptor (died 1546)
- date unknown - Ippolito Costa, Italian painter (died 1561)
- probable
  - Domenico del Barbieri, Florentine painter (died 1570)
  - Hans Brosamer, German engraver, wood-cutter, and portraitist (died 1554)
  - Girolamo Lombardo, Italian sculptor (died 1590)
  - Bernard Salomon, French painter, draftsman and engraver (died 1561)

== Deaths ==
- August 26 - Sesshū Tōyō, master of suibokuga (ink painting), and a Rinzai Zen Buddhist priest (born 1420)
- September 13 - Andrea Mantegna, Italian Renaissance painter and engraver (born 1431)
- probable
  - Pietro di Domenico - Italian Renaissance painter (born 1457)
  - Pier Antonio Mezzastris, Italian painter of the Umbrian school (born 1430)
  - Giovanni di Stefano, Italian bronze-caster, engineer, and sculptor (born 1443)
