= 1594 in art =

Events from the year 1594 in art.

== Events ==
- Hendrick de Clerck becomes court painter to Archduke Ernest of Austria.

== Paintings ==
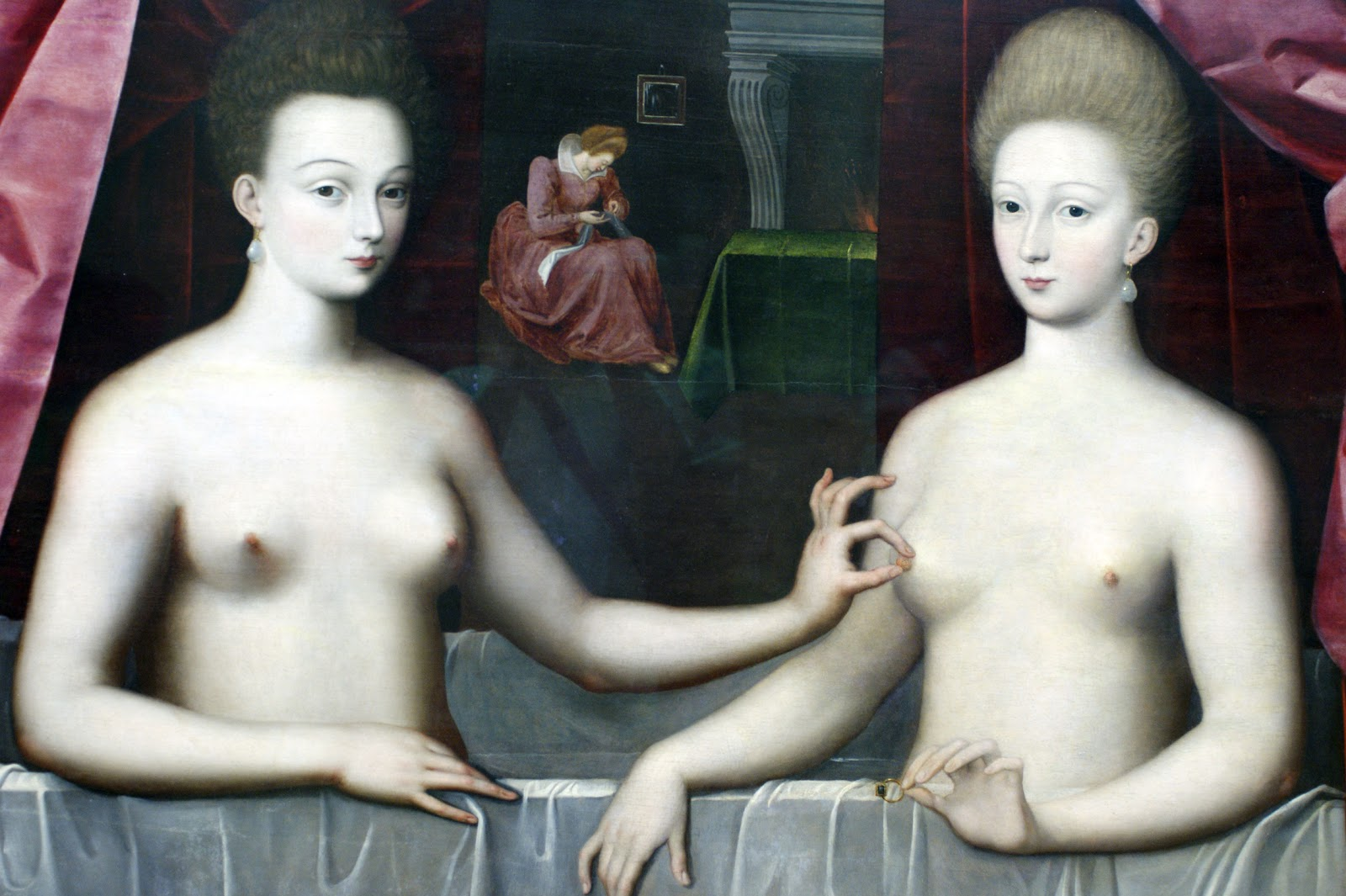
Anon., Gabrielle d'Estrées

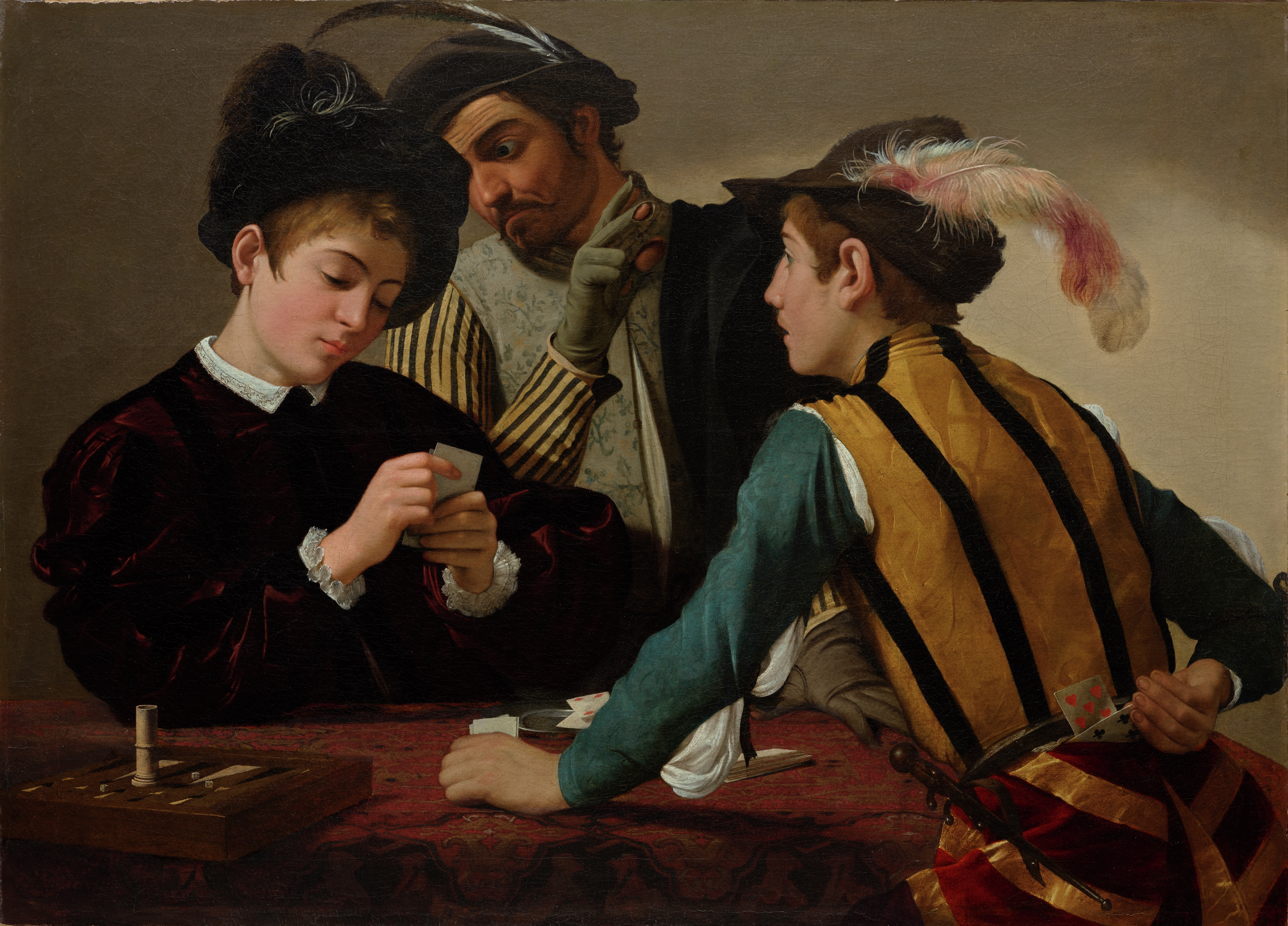
Caravaggio, The Cardsharps

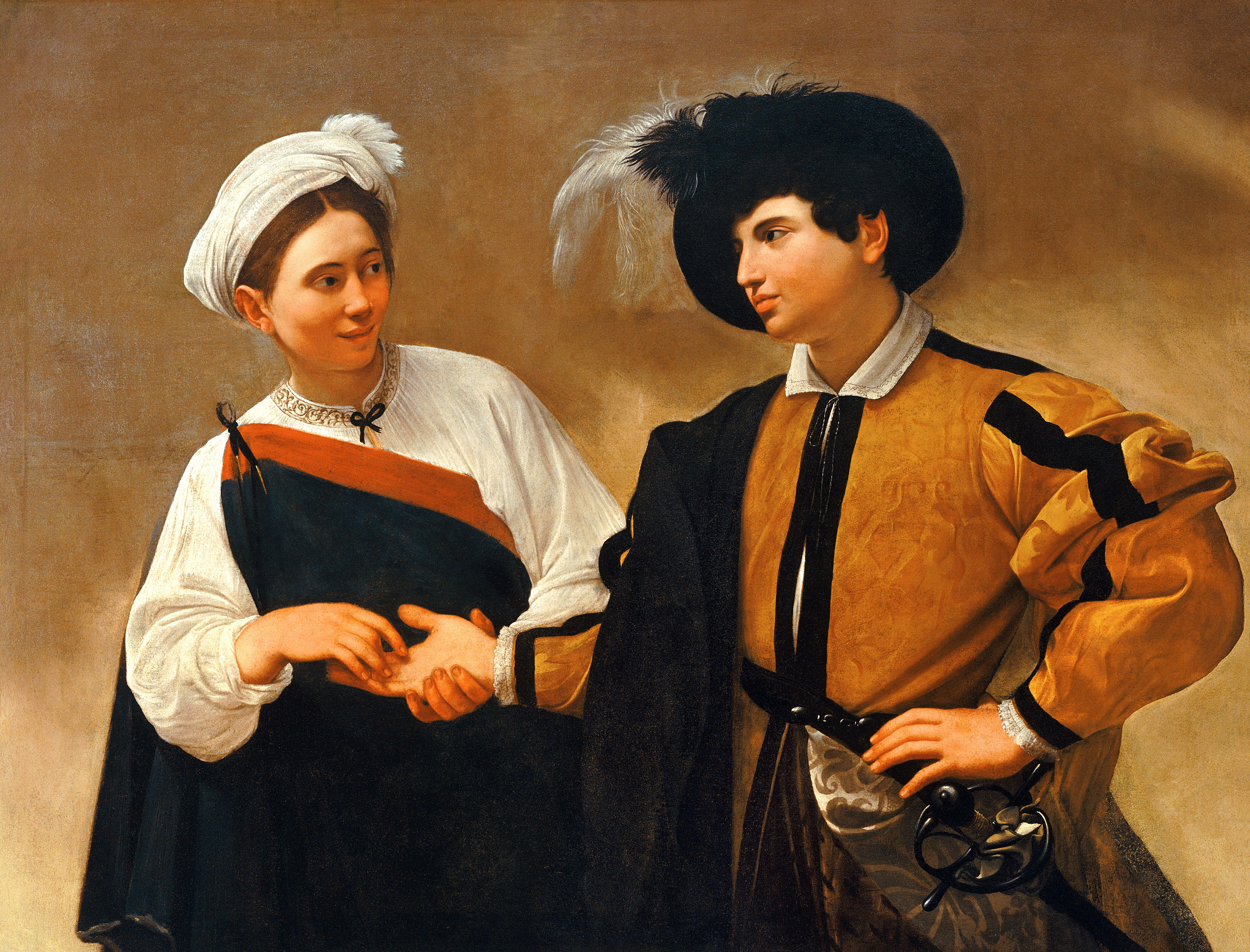
Caravaggio, The Fortune Teller

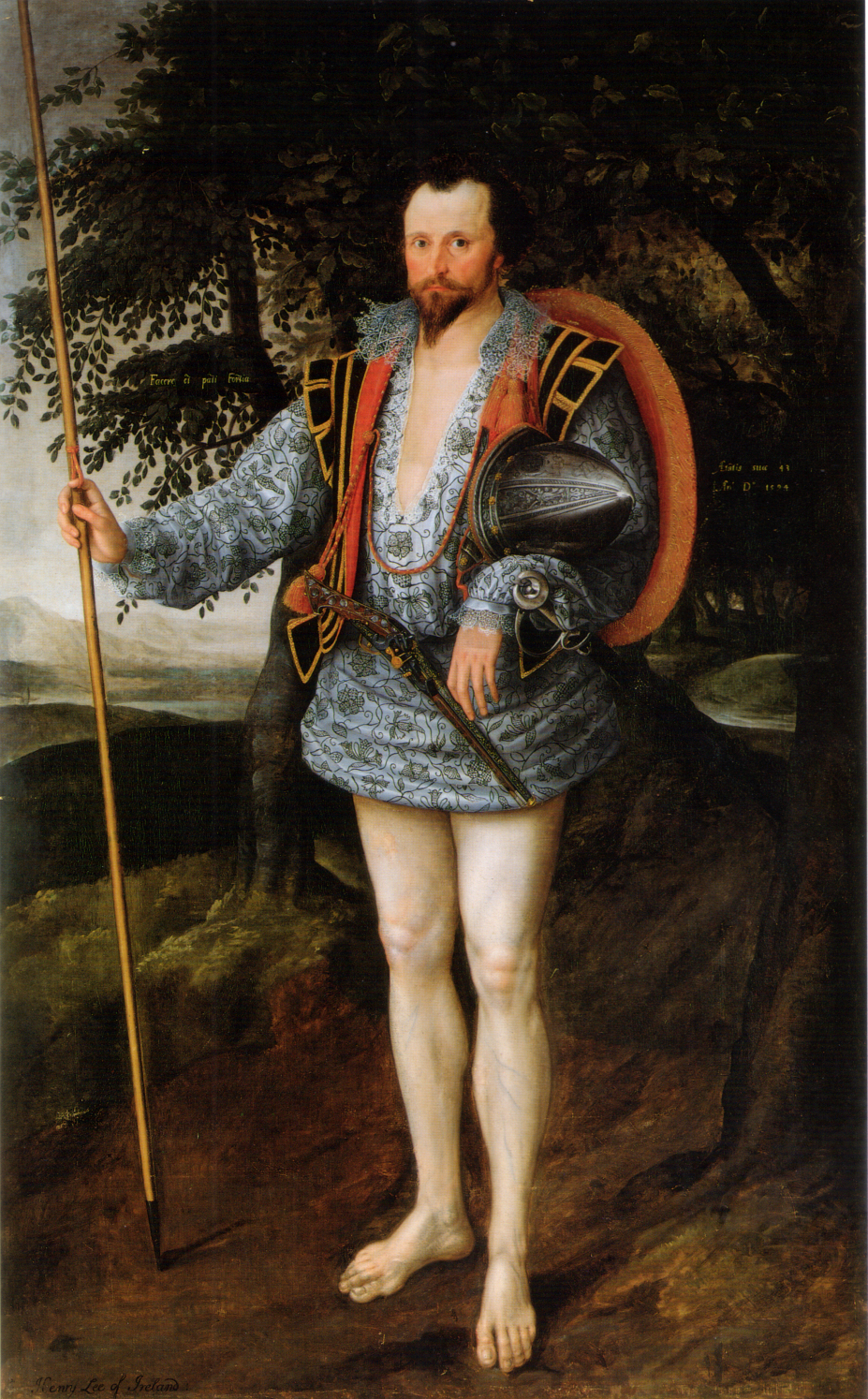
Gheeraerts, Captain Thomas Lee

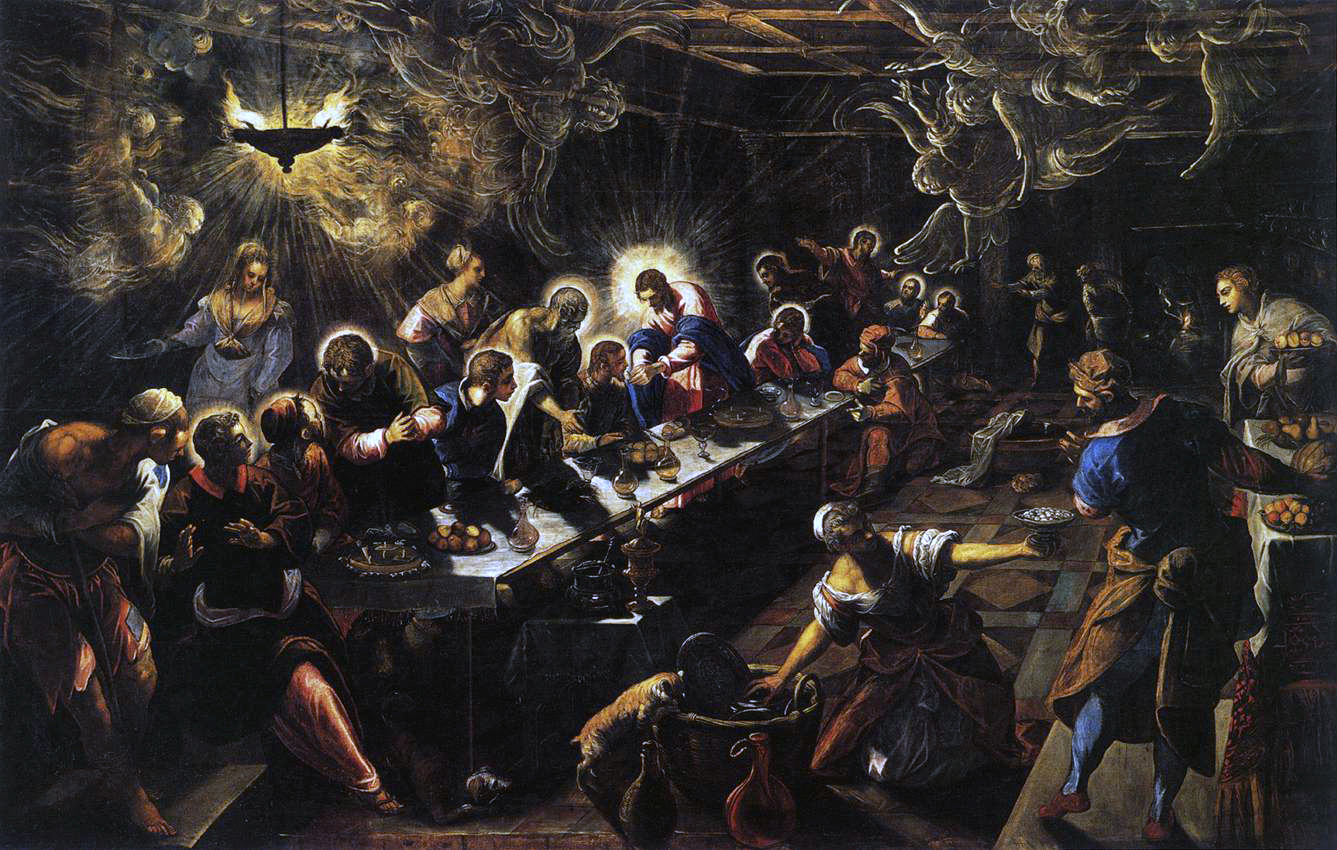
Tintoretto, The Last Supper
- Caravaggio
  - The Cardsharps
  - The Fortune Teller
- Ludovico Carracci – Transfiguration
- Marcus Gheeraerts the Younger – Captain Thomas Lee
- Tommaso Laureti – Frescos in Palazzo dei Conservatori, Rome (1587–94)
- Tintoretto – The Last Supper (fresco in San Giorgio Maggiore, Venice, 1592–94)
- Second School of Fontainebleau – Gabrielle d'Estrées and one of her sisters (Louvre, Paris)

== Sculpture ==
- Black Christ of Esquipulas

== Births ==
- March 25 - Maria Tesselschade Visscher, Dutch poet and engraver (died 1649)
- June 15 - Nicolas Poussin, French painter in the classical style (died 1665)
- July 10 - Bartolomeo Gennari, Italian Renaissance painter (died 1661)
- December - Jacob Gerritsz Cuyp, Dutch portrait and landscape painter (died 1652)
- December 14 - Willem Claeszoon Heda, Dutch artist devoted exclusively to the painting of still life (died 1680)
- date unknown
  - Charles Audran, French engraver (died 1674)
  - Giovanni Battista Barca, Italian painter (died 1650)
  - Peter Oliver, English miniaturist (died 1648)
  - Clara Peeters, Flemish still life painter (died c.1657)
  - Carlo Ridolfi, Italian art biographer and painter (died 1658)
  - Cornelis van Poelenburgh, Dutch painter (died 1667)

== Deaths ==
- May 31 – Tintoretto (real name Jacopo Comin) Italian painter of the Venetian school and probably the last great painter of the Italian Renaissance (born 1518)
- date unknown
  - Cristóvão Lopes, Portuguese portrait and altarpiece painter (born 1516)
  - Francisco Venegas, Spanish painter active in Portugal (born 1525)
