= Léal Souvenir =

Small 1432 portrait of a man by Jan van Eyck in London

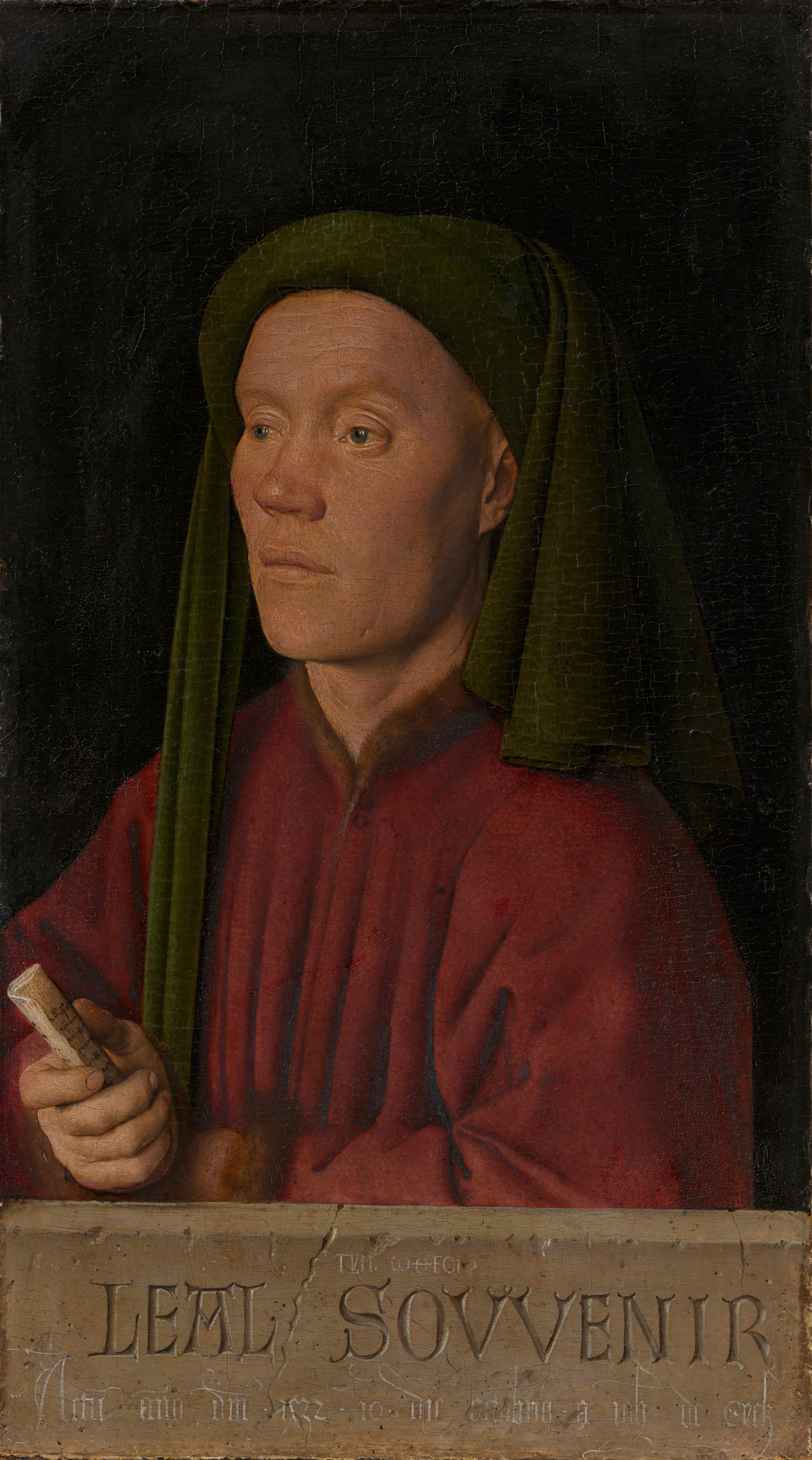
- Artist: Jan van Eyck
- Year: 1432
- Medium: Oil on oak panel
- Dimensions: 33.3 cm × 18.9 cm (13.1 in × 7.4 in)
- Location: National Gallery; London
- Accession: NG290

Léal Souvenir (also known as Timotheus or Portrait of a Man) is a small oil-on-oak panel portrait by the Early Netherlandish painter Jan van Eyck, dated 1432. The sitter has not been identified, but his distinctive features suggest a historical person rather than the hypothetical ideal typical of the time in northern Renaissance portraiture; his slight, unassuming torso contrasts with a sophisticated facial expression. His features have been described as "plain and rustic", yet thoughtful and inward-looking. The sitter was apparently a significant enough member of the Burgundian duke Philip the Good's circle that his court painter portrayed him.

The man sits before an imitation parapet with three sets of painted inscriptions, each rendered to look as if chiselled or scratched into stone. Van Eyck did not have full command of either classical Greek or Latin and made errors, so readings by modern scholars vary. The first inscription is in Greek and appears to read "TYΜ.ωΘΕΟϹ", which has not been satisfactorily interpreted, though it has led some to title the work 'Timotheus'. The middle reads in French "Leal Souvenir" ("Loyal Memory") and indicates that the portrait is a posthumous commemoration. The third records van Eyck's signature and the date of execution. The 19th-century art historian Hippolyte Fierens-Gevaert identified the lettering "TYΜ.ωΘΕΟC" with the Greek musician Timotheus of Miletus. Panofsky drew the same conclusion, eliminating other Greeks bearing the name Timothy; they were of a religious or military background, professions that do not match the sitter's civilian dress. Panofsky believed the man was probably a highly placed musician in Philip's court, possibly Gilles Binchois.

More recent research focuses on the legalese in one of the inscriptions, suggesting to some that he was connected to the legal profession or an employee of Philip the Good. The panel was acquired in 1857 by the National Gallery, London, where it is on permanent display.

== Description ==
Léal Souvenir is one of the earliest surviving examples of secular portraiture in medieval European art and one of the earliest extant unidealised representations. This is apparent in its realism and acute observation of the details of the man's everyday appearance. Van Eyck worked in the early Renaissance tradition and pioneered the manipulation of oil paint. Oil allowed smooth translucent surfaces, could be applied across a range of thicknesses, and could be altered while wet, which allowed far more subtle detail than available to previous generations of painters.

The parapet dominates the portrait, and his head seems oversized compared to his upper body. Some art historians speculate that this is a result of van Eyck's then inexperience; it was only his second known portrait. Meiss speculates that van Eyck may have "los[t] control of [the] design as a whole by indulging his astounding virtuosity."

=== Parapet ===
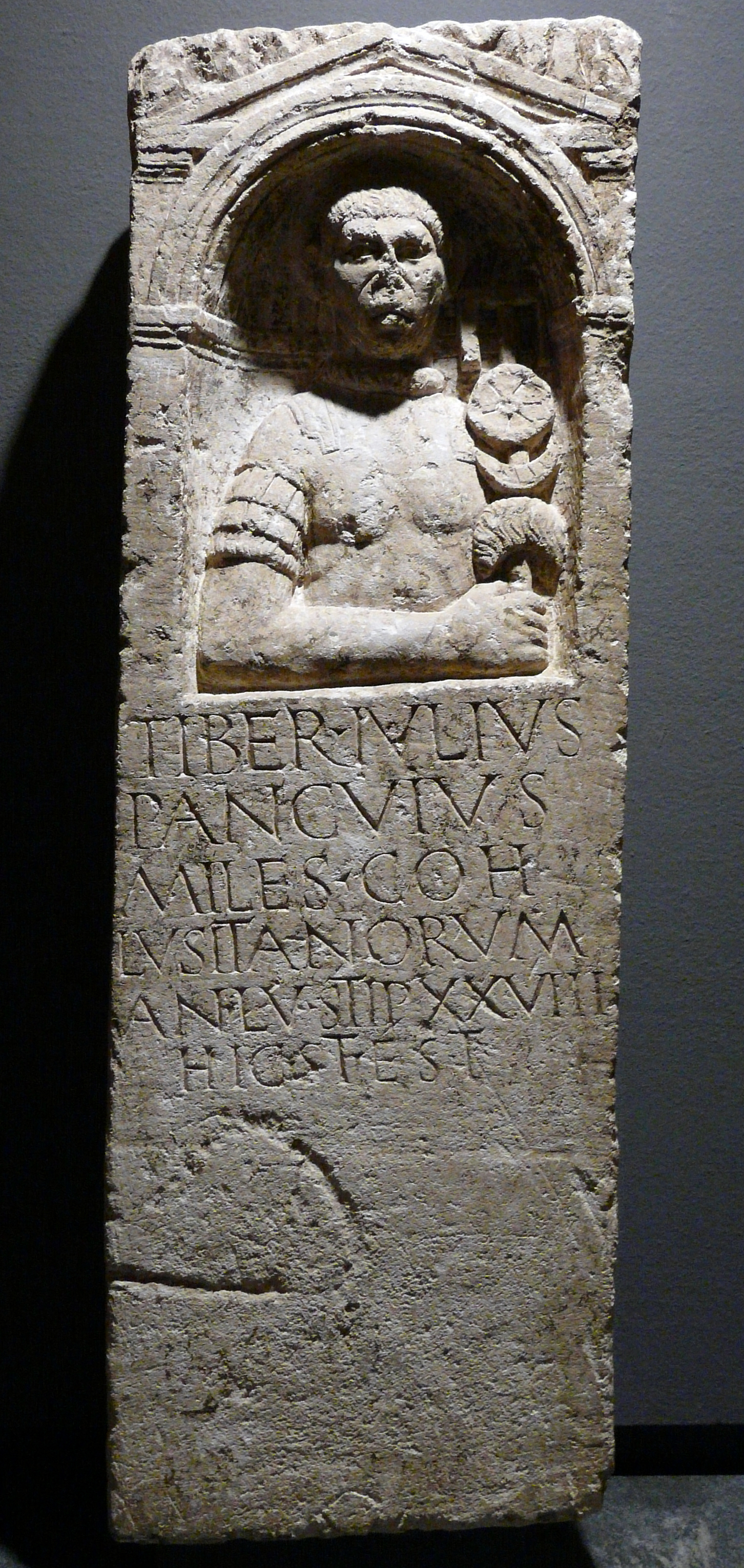
Tombstone of the soldier Tiberius Julius Pancuius. See also Fayum mummy portraits.

The decayed parapet allows van Eyck to display his skill in mimicking stone chiselling and scarring, and shows the influence of classical Roman funerary art, particularly stone memorials. The parapet gives the work gravitas, the chips and cracks conveying a sense of the venerable, or, according to art historian Elisabeth Dhanens, a sense of the "fragility of life or of memory itself".

=== Portrait ===
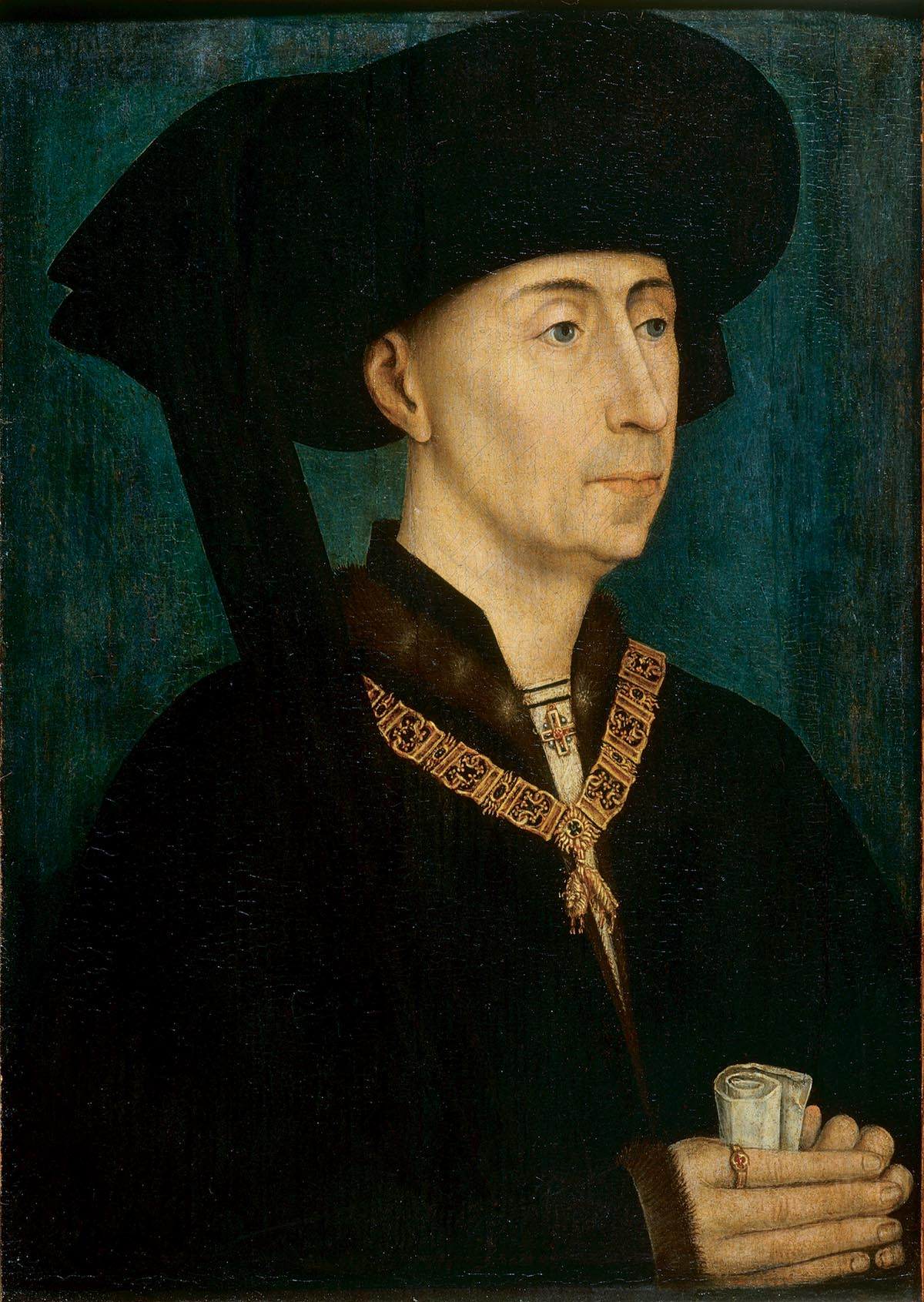
Copy of Rogier van der Weyden, Portrait of Philip the Good, c. 1445. Here, Philip is captured in a similar but inverted pose. As in van Eyck's panel, the scroll is inscribed on the outside with fictive writing.

The man is positioned within an undefined narrow space and set against a flat black background. Typically for van Eyck, the head is large in relation to the torso. He is dressed in typically Burgundian fashion, with a red robe and a green wool chaperon with a bourrelet and cornette hanging forward. The headdress is trimmed with fur, fastened with two buttons, and extends to the parapet. His right hand might be holding the end of the cornette. Neither the shape of his head nor his facial features correspond to contemporary standard types, let alone canons of ideal beauty. The sitter appears to be bald, although there are some faint traces of fair hair, leading Erwin Panofsky to conclude that his "countenance is as 'Nordic' as his dress is Burgundian." Though he has neither eyebrows nor stubble, he does have eyelashes that are believed to have been added by a 19th-century restorer. Van Eyck's cool observation of the man's narrow shoulders, pursed lips, and thin eyebrows extends to detailing the moisture on his blue eyes.

Unlike Rogier van der Weyden, who paid especially close attention to detail in rendering his models' fingers, for van Eyck hands were often something of an afterthought. They are generically rendered, do not contain much detail, and may have been a later workshop addition. Yet they are very similar to those of the sitter in his c. 1435 Portrait of Baudouin de Lannoy. The man holds a scroll that might be a legal document, letter, or pamphlet. In his early portraits, van Eyck's sitters are often shown holding objects indicative of their profession. The scroll contains six lines of illegible writing. The abbreviations are more prominent and seem to be in Latin, but may be vernacular.

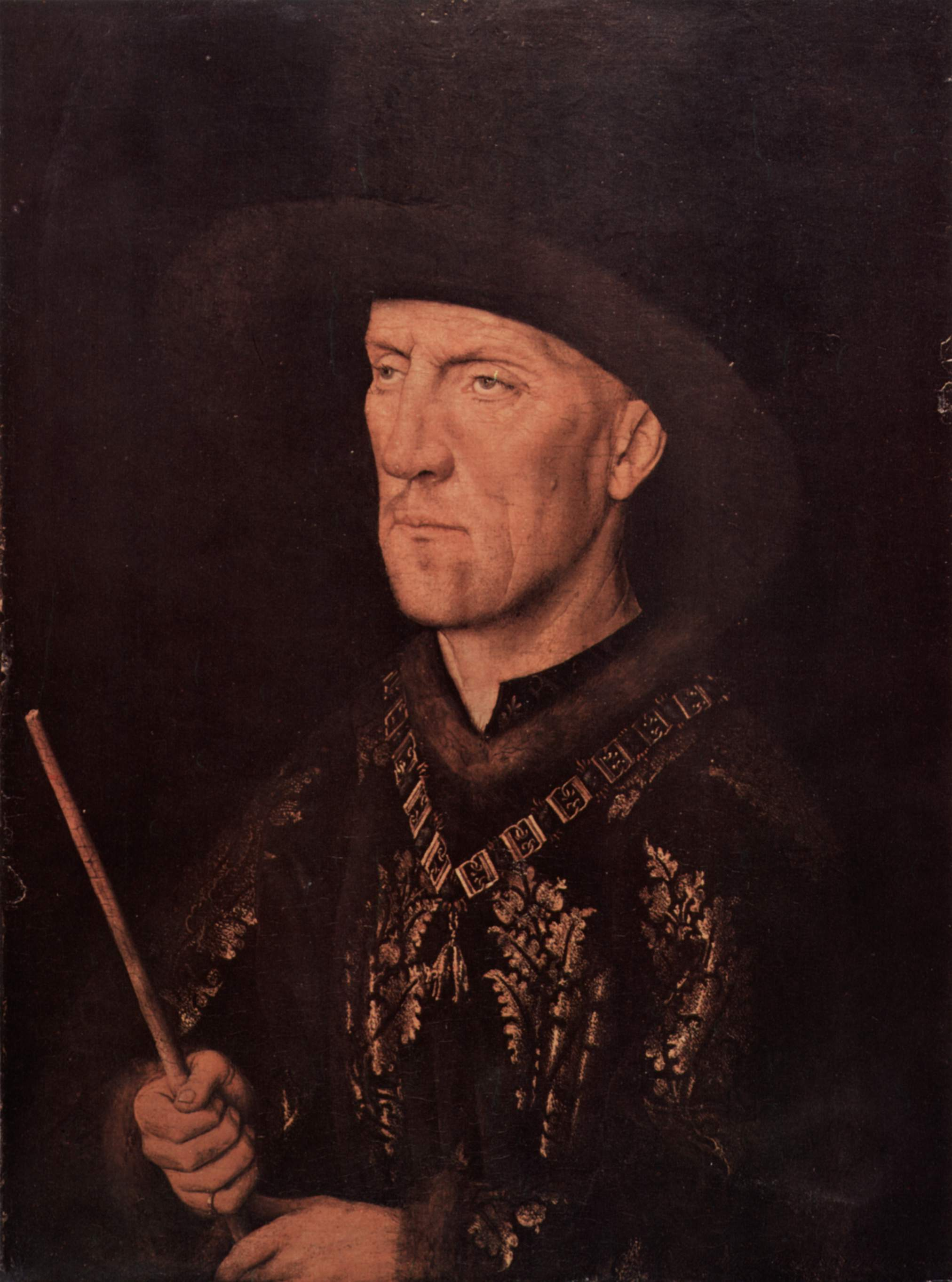
Portrait of Baudouin de Lannoy, c. 1435. Staatliche Museen zu Berlin, Gemäldegalerie, Berlin. Van Eyck's early portraits typically show the sitter holding an emblem of his profession and class.

Light falls from the left, leaving traces of shadow on the side of the man's face, a device commonly found in van Eyck's early portraits. He is youthful, and his face has a soft fleshiness achieved through shallow curves and flowing, harmonious brushstrokes, giving the appearance of a relaxed, warm, and open personality, which Meiss describes as evoking an almost "Rembrandtesque warmth and sympathy". The sitter is not handsome; he has a flattish face, a stubby yet pointed nose, and prominent cheekbones that might, according to Panofsky, belong to a "Flemish peasant". Dhanens describes him as having an honest expression.

A number of art historians have noted the apparent contradiction between the man's plain looks and enigmatic expression. Meiss describes him as "plain and rustic", and finds a resemblance between his rather generic face and a number of figures in the lower portions of the "Adoration of the Lamb" panel in the Ghent Altarpiece. Agreeing with Panofsky, he observes a "thoughtfulness on the high, wrinkled forehead, visionary force in the dreamy yet steady eyes, [and] a formidable strength of passion in the wide, firm mouth". According to Panofsky, the man's face is not that of an intellectual, yet he detects a pensive and lonely nature, "the face of one who feels and produces rather than observes and dissects".

=== Inscriptions and identity of the sitter ===
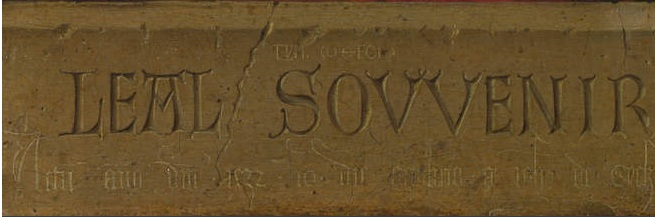
Detail showing the three inscriptions

The parapet has three horizontal rows of inscriptions; on the upper and lower rows is smaller lettering that is often not visible in reproductions. In places, the Greek characters are unclear and have been subject to much speculation by art historians, not least due to van Eyck's sometimes erratic spelling and unusual spacing.

The top lettering is in chalk white and Greek script that reads "TYΜ.ωΘΕΟC". The last character is deliberately concealed by a chip in the imitation stone, a touch described by Panofsky as a "terminal flourish". This makes the meaning of the inscription difficult to discern. A general consensus among art historians is that the final character is a square C or sigma sign.

"TYΜ.ωΘΕΟC" was interpreted in 1857 by Charles Eastlake as "Timotheos", a proper name. Campbell points out that van Eyck "appears to have employed the Greek alphabet systematically", and always employed the square sigma C for the Latin "S", and a majuscule omega ω (in the uncial form) for the Latin "O". The inscription may be meant to read "Honour God", or "Be Honoured, O God", as written in the passive imperative. Panofsky gives some consideration to the hypothesis that the final letter is a "N", and that the lettering forms two words rather than one. In this interpretation, the letters spell TYΜω ΘΕΟN, meaning "Honour God". While this would be more straightforward than "Timotheus", he rejects the possibility. He writes that "the presence of a shorter horizontal line connecting with the slightly tapering top of the vertical stroke and completing it into a Γ form ... evidently precludes a "N". Dhanens suggests the inscription can be read as "Time Deum" ("Fear God"), a known motto of the Vilain family.

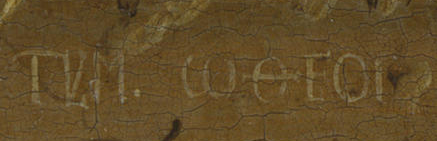
Detail showing the uppermost inscription. Note the punctuation after the third character, and the deliberately obscured final character.

Eastlake's translation is generally accepted. The possibility of it being a variant of "Timothy" has been discounted, as that word was not used in Northern Europe before the Reformation. There is no Germanic name that might imply a humanistic imitation of a Greek word, so art historians have sought to identify the man from Greek history or legend. Although some have suggested certain Athenian and Syrian generals, these have been discounted as the sitter is not wearing military clothing. Saint Timothy, first Bishop of Ephesus and an associate of Saint Paul, has been suggested but eliminated as the man is not dressed as a high cleric.

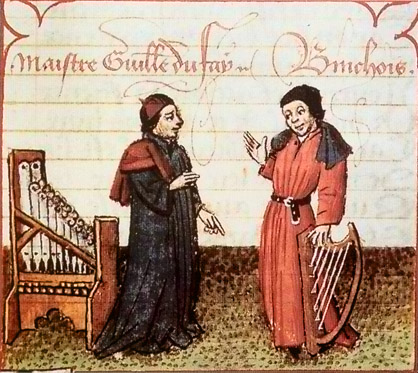
Martin le Franc, Guillaume Dufay and Gilles Binchois, c. 1440s (Binchois right)

The larger middle inscription is in French, using a 12th-century script. It reads "LEAL SOVVENIR" (Loyal Remembrance, or Faithful Souvenir), and is painted to give the impression that it was carved into the parapet. In 1927 Hippolyte Fierens Gevaert put forward Timotheus of Miletus, a Greek musician and dithyrambic poet born c. 446. Gevaert proposed that the portrait commemorated a recently deceased court artist and that the classical reference was intended to flatter his memory. Panofsky largely went with this position in 1949. He speculated that the sitter was the celebrated musician Gilles Binchois, by 1430 a canon at St. Donatian's Cathedral, Bruges. Campbell is sceptical, disclaiming that the sitter "is not dressed as a cleric". Other theories include that the man was a Greek or Lucchese merchant, Henry the Navigator, Jean de Croÿ or, less likely, that it is a self-portrait. Though there is much disagreement, it is probable that he was a native French speaker, and a notary, poet, or member of the Compagnie du Chapel Vert ("Society of the Green Hat") at Tournai. Dhanens rejects the theory that the man was a musician on the basis that van Eyck would have made this explicit, portraying him holding a device or emblem clearly symbolising music. She concludes that he is an accountant or lawyer holding a legal or financial document.

From the first two inscriptions, the panel is generally accepted as a posthumous portrait. Roman tombstones often showed a representation of the deceased behind a parapet with a carved inscription, and van Eyck may have known of these from travels to France. The lower inscription reads "Actu[m] an[n]o d[omi]ni.1432.10.die octobris.a.ioh[anne] de Eyck" (Finished in the year of our Lord 1432 on the 10th day of October by Jan van Eyck). Campbell observes that the phrasing of this extended signature is surprisingly reminiscent of legalese, and that van Eyck seems to be reinforcing the idea that the man was a legal professional, who may have worked for the Dukes of Burgundy. Jacques Paviot notes that it is written in the Gothic cursive script bastarda, then favoured by the legal profession. In either case, although he is not grandly dressed and is probably a member of the middle class, he must have been highly regarded in Philip's court, given that such portraits rarely depicted non-nobles.

== Condition ==
The panel consists of a single 8-millimetre (0.3 in)-thick oak board, cut vertically down close to the painted surface. It has a small unpainted area at the upper left. The support's encasing was probably changed in the 19th century; today four of the eight supports are fixed to the edges of the interior borders, forming inner mouldings. The other four act as inner pins. The varnish is severely degraded, with key areas of paint and ground either removed or overpainted. Infrared photography of the reverse reveals traces of short vertical hatching and underdrawings, but no hint as to the identity of the sitter. Its ground is mostly chalk-based; the pigments are predominantly blacks, red lake, and blues. The final portrait differs in many ways from the underdrawing – the fingers are shorter, the right thumb and the parapet are lower, and the right arm once extended over a larger area. In the final portrait, the ear is elevated, and the scroll occupies a larger portion of the pictorial space. Analysis of the pigment shows that the flesh of his face is painted with whites and vermilion, and traced with greys, blacks, blues, and some ultramarine over a red-lake glaze.

The portrait is not particularly well preserved. There are yellowish layers of glaze over the face, probably later additions. The varnishes have degraded and lost their original colours. The panel has undergone a number of detrimental retouchings. In some instances, these have altered the sitter's appearance, most especially the removal of strands of fair hair below the chaperon. It has sustained structural damage, especially to the marble on the reverse. The National Gallery repaired some "slight injuries" when it came into their possession in 1857. Campbell notes a number of efforts by later restorers were imperfect and "rather disfiguring", including touchings to the man's nostrils and eyelashes, and the tip of his nose. There is a yellowish glaze over the eyes that seems to be either damage or overpaint. The panel is discoloured overall and suffers from aged and degenerated varnishes that make the original pigments hard to discern.

== Provenance ==
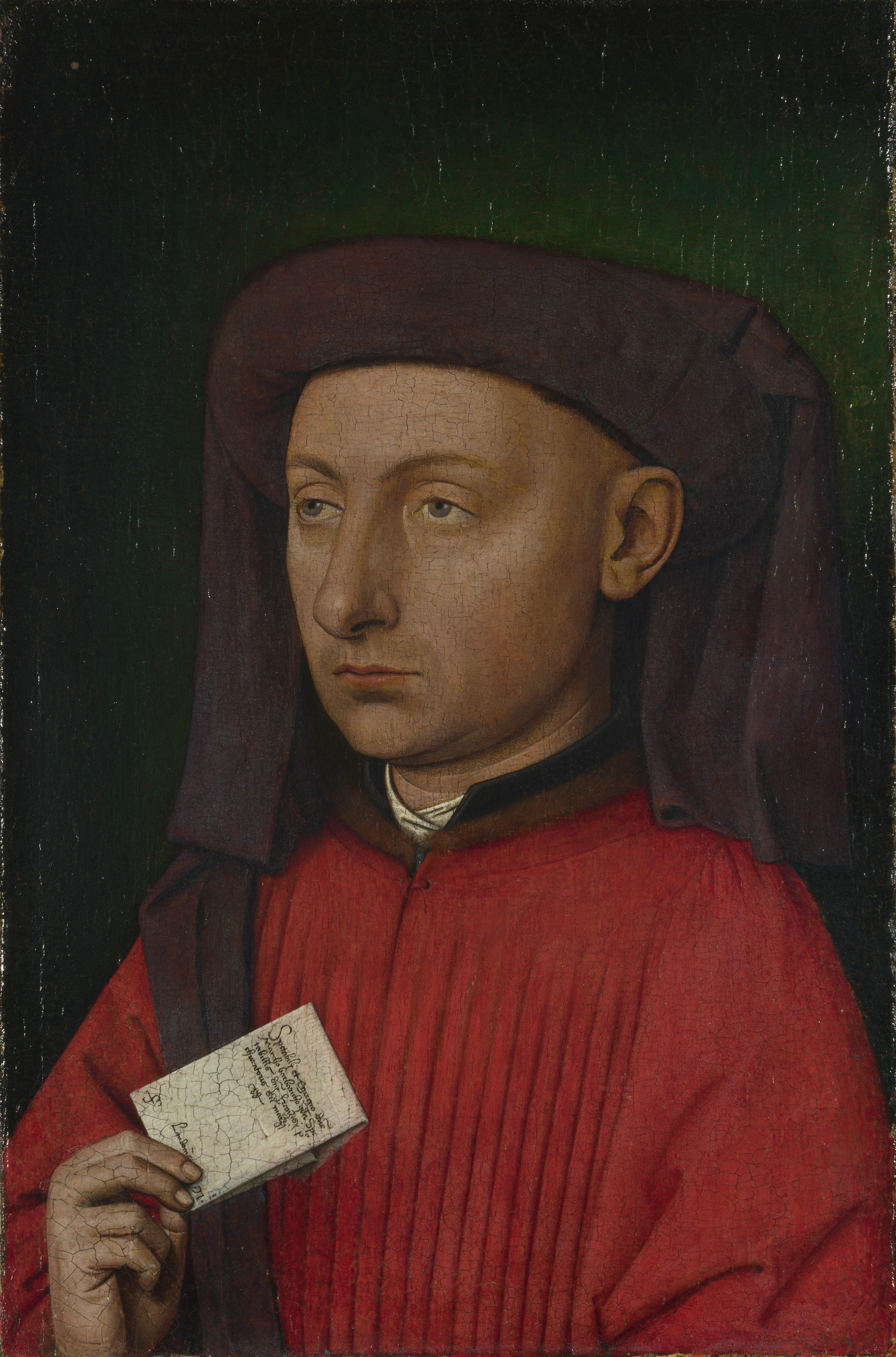
Follower of Jan van Eyck, Portrait of Marco Barbarigo, c. 1449–1450. National Gallery, London

The painting was widely copied and imitated during the 15th century. Near-contemporary copper reproductions are known from Bergamo and Turin. Petrus Christus borrowed the illusionistic carving on the parapet for his 1446 Portrait of a Carthusian. A c. 1449–50 portrait of the Venetian Doge Marco Barbarigo attributed to a follower of van Eyck is also heavily indebted to Léal Souvenir in that it is also unusually tall and narrow, with a large space above the sitter's head.

The painting is first recorded in the notes of Charles Eastlake, the National Gallery's collector and later director, in 1857, the year it was acquired. He mentions that it had been in the possession of the Scottish landscape painter Karl Ross (1816–1858) "before 1854". Like many of van Eyck's works and those of the Early Netherlandish painters in general, the painting's provenance is murky before the 19th century. During the National Gallery's attribution verification, the two copper reproductions were noted. The first was found by Eastlake in the collection of the Lochis family of Bergamo in Italy, the second in Turin, belonging to Count Castellane Harrach is described as smaller than the original and "very weak". Both are now lost.

Ink markings on the reverse of the marble show a small cross that may indicate a merchant's mark or emblem. Although it is incomplete and no identification has been made, W. H. J. Weale detected the mark of "an early Italian, probably Venetian owner". An early provenance in Italy would not imply that the man came from that country; van Eyck's works were often purchased by collectors from that region.

== Sources ==
- Acres, Alfred. "Jan van Eyck: within His Art". London: Reaktion Books, 2013. ISBN 978-1-7891-4761-2
- Bauman, Guy. "Early Flemish Portraits 1425–1525". The Metropolitan Museum of Art Bulletin, volume 43, No. 4, Spring, 1986
- Borchert, Till-Holger. Van Eyck. London: Taschen, 2008. ISBN 3-8228-5687-8
- Campbell, Lorne. The Fifteenth-Century Netherlandish Paintings. London: National Gallery, 1998. ISBN 0-300-07701-7
- Dhanens, Elisabeth. Hubert and Jan van Eyck. New York: Tabard Press, 1980. ISBN 0-914427-00-8
- Harbison, Craig. Jan van Eyck, The Play of Realism. London: Reaktion Books, 1991. ISBN 0-948462-18-3
- Jones, Susan Frances. Van Eyck to Gossaert. London: National Gallery, 2011. ISBN 978-1-85709-504-3
- Kemperdick, Stephan. The Early Portrait, from the Collection of the Prince of Liechtenstein and the Kunstmuseum Basel. Munich: Prestel, 2006. ISBN 3-7913-3598-7
- Meiss, Millard. "'Nicholas Albergati' and the Chronology of Jan van Eyck's Portraits". Burlington Magazine, volume 94, No. 590, May 1952
- Pächt, Otto. Van Eyck and the Founders of Early Netherlandish Painting. 1999. London: Harvey Miller Publishers. ISBN 1-872501-28-1
- Panofsky, Erwin. "Who Is Jan van Eyck's 'Tymotheos'?". Journal of the Warburg and Courtauld Institutes, volume 12, 1949
- Paviot, Jacques. "The Sitter for Jan van Eyck's 'Leal Sovvenir". Journal of the Warburg and Courtauld Institutes, volume 58, 1995
- Smith, Jeffrey Chipps. The Northern Renaissance. London: Phaidon Press, 2004. ISBN 0-7148-3867-5
- Upton, Joel Morgan. Petrus Christus: His Place in Fifteenth-Century Flemish painting. University Park, PA: Pennsylvania State University Press, 1989 ISBN 0-271-00672-2
- Weale, W. H. J. Hubert and John Van Eyck, their life and work. London: J. Lane Company, 1908
- Wood, Wendy. "A new identification of the sitter in Jan van Eyck's Tymotheus portrait". The Art Bulletin, volume 60, No. 4, December 1978
