= Giovanbattista Branconio dell'Aquila =

Raphael, Self-portrait with a friend - the friend (right) may be Branconio.

Giovanbattista Branconio dell'Aquila (1473 – 1522) was a papal protonotary and chamberlain, as well as a friend of the artist Raphael (who painted The Visitation; Raphael designed the palace of Palazzo Branconio dell'Aquila on via Alessandrina in the Borgo for him).

Branconio, who was born in L'Aquila, was also the personal keeper of Hanno, the white elephant brought to Rome in 1514.

== Raphael's Visitation ==
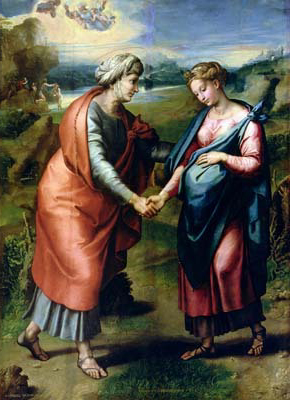
Branconio Visitation

Around 1517 Raphael painted a great Visitation at the request of Marino Branconio, father of Giovanni Battista. The Visitation enriched the Branconio Chapel inside the church of San Silvestro, near the family palazzo in Aquila. Marino's wife was named Elisabetta, and the Visitation represents the Virgin Mary and Saint Elizabeth. In 1655 the canvas was forcefully removed by occupying Spanish troops and taken to El Escorial. Today it is part of the permanent collection of the Museo del Prado, while a copy can be seen in the Branconio Chapel.
