= Visitation (Raphael) =

Painting by Raphael

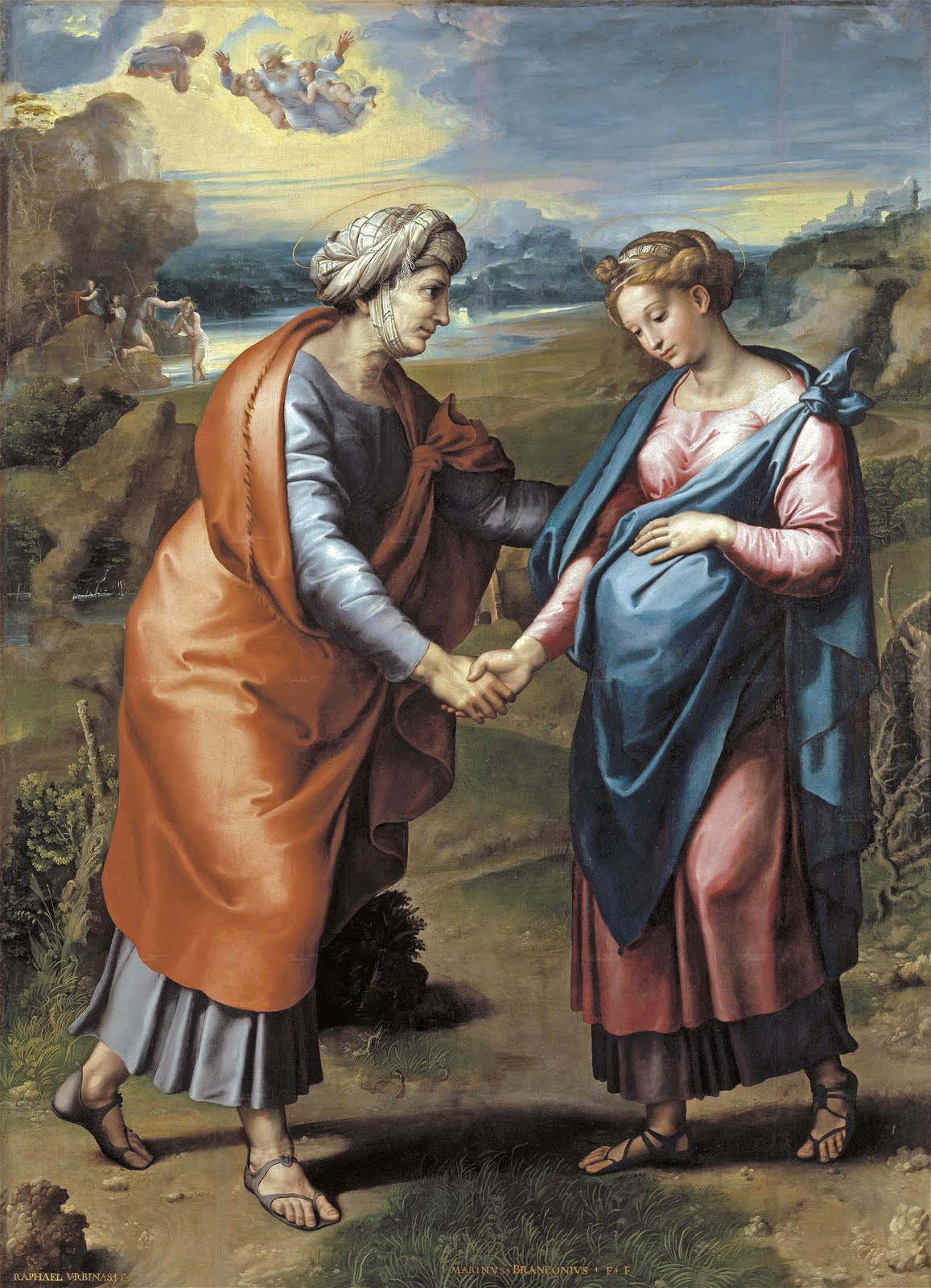
- Artist: Raphael
- Year: c.1517
- Dimensions: 200 cm × 145 cm (79 in × 57 in)
- Location: Museo del Prado, Madrid

The Visitation is a c. 1517 painting of the Visitation of the Virgin Mary to Saint Elizabeth by Raphael, in the Prado Museum since 1837. Commissioned by the Apostolic Protonotary Giovanni Branconio at his father Marino's request for their family chapel in the church of San Silvestro in L'Aquila (Marino's wife was called Elisabeth), it was plundered by the occupation troops of Philip IV of Spain in 1655 and placed at El Escorial.

== See also ==
- List of paintings by Raphael
