= Bartolomeo Sanvito =

Italian scribe (1433–1511)

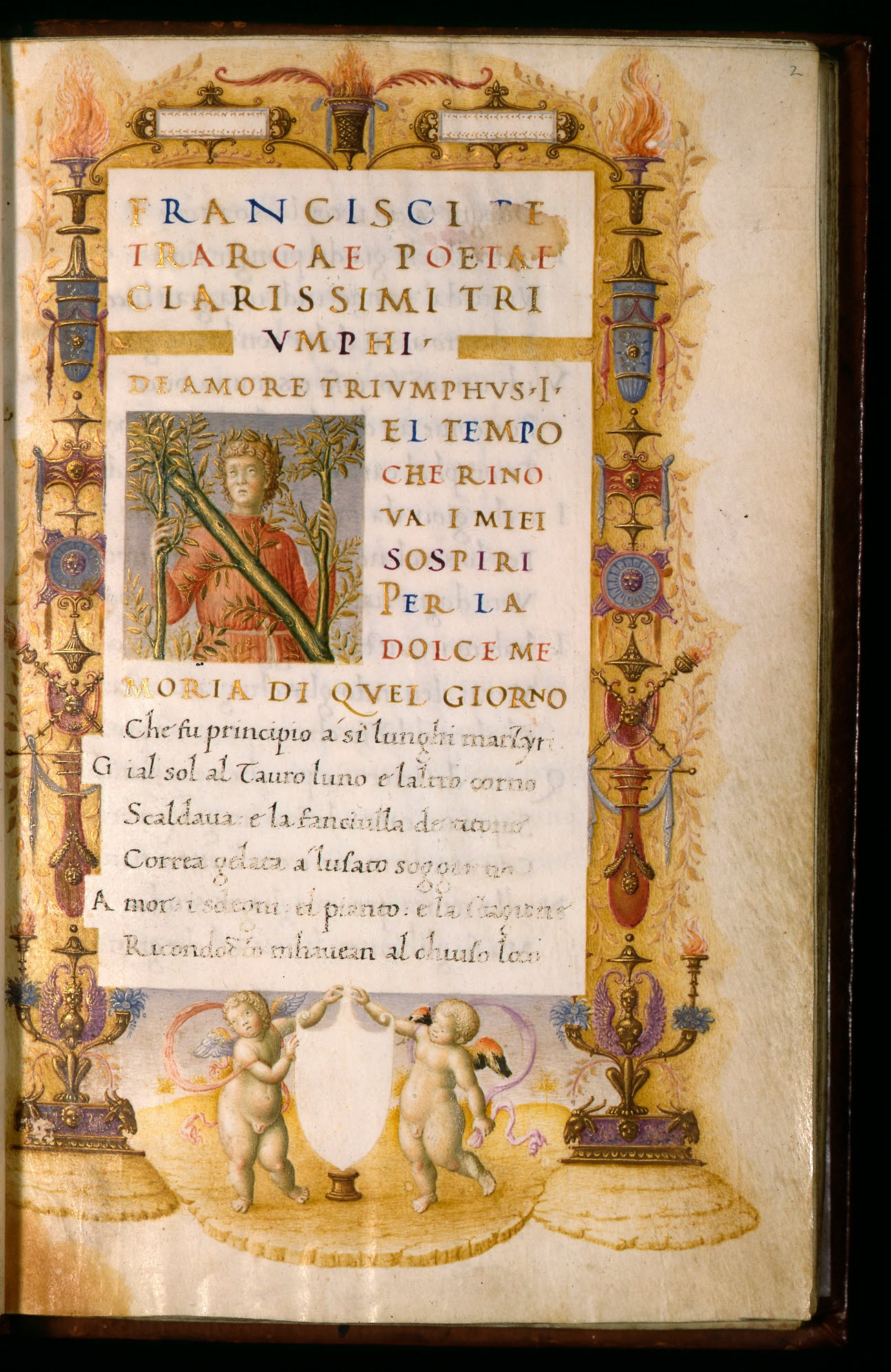
Page from Sanvito's manuscript of Petrarch's Triumphs, ca. 1480.

Bartolomeo Sanvito (February/March 1433–July 1511) was a scribe from Padua in Italy, but trained in Rome. He was a master of Humanist italic script. Square capital letters alternating colored and gold are a characteristic of his style.

The most detailed account of Sanvito in English is by A. C. de la Mare and Laura Nuvoloni, Bartolomeo Sanvito: the Life and Work of a Renaissance Scribe, (Paris: Association internationala de Bibliophilie, 2009). See also James Wardrop, The Script of Humanism: Some Aspects of Humanistic Script 1460 - 1560 (Oxford University Press, 1963), although some information here is outdated.
