= Pellegrino di Giovanni =

Italian painter

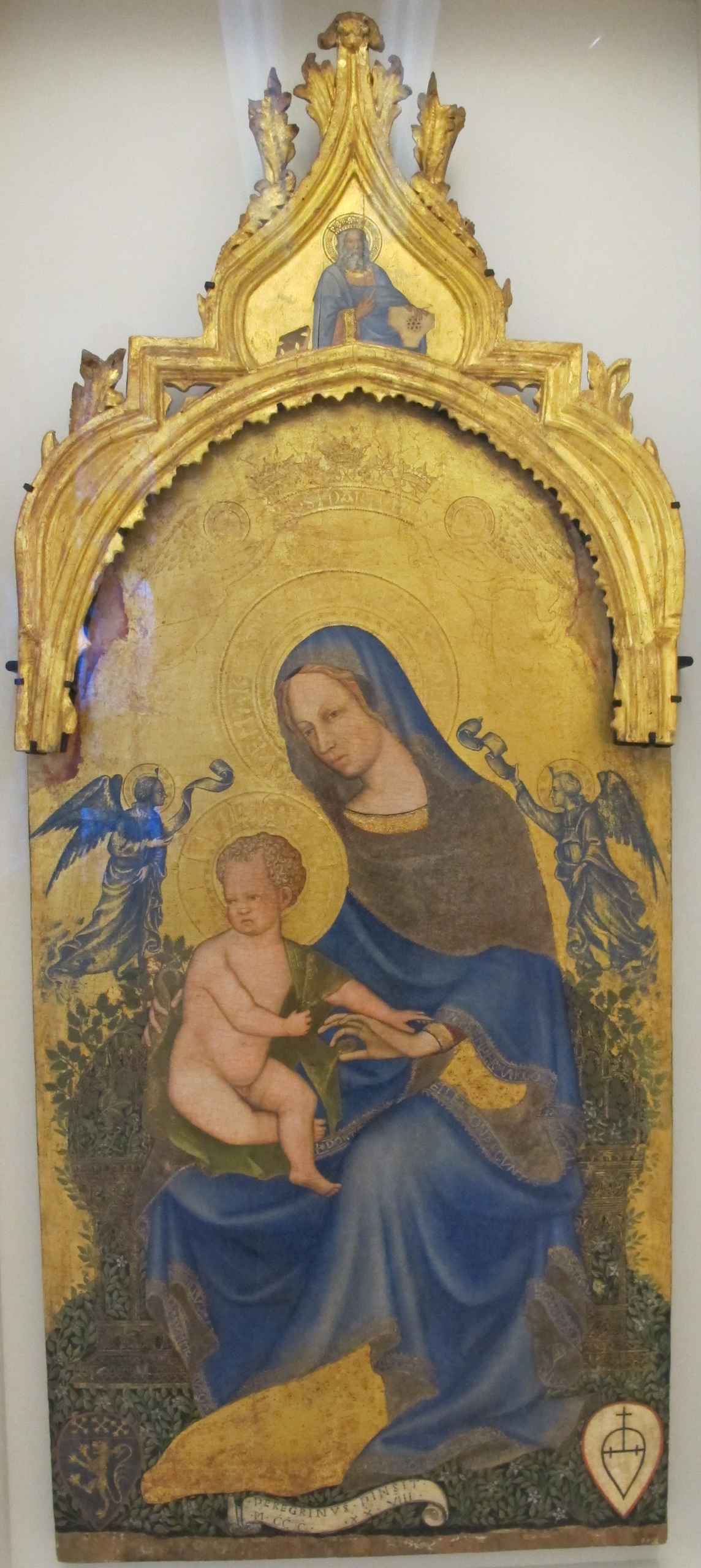
Virgin and Child with Two Angels by Pellegrino di Giovanni, 1428

Pellegrino di Giovanni, also Pellegrino di Giovanni di Antonio, (died 1435) was an Italian painter. His exact dates of birth and death are not known.

Pellegrino di Giovanni di Antonio was born in Perugia, which he is known to have worked in and around. He became treasurer of the local painter's guild in 1428. He was considered one of the leading painters in Perugia during this period, and executed commissions for the wealthy merchant Nicola di Giovanni di Benedetto di Giovanni. After his death in 1435 his workshop passed to his pupil Mariano d’Antonio.

== Works ==
- a panel depicting St. Michael in the Museum of Fine Arts, Boston is attributed to him
- a panel depicting The Virgin and Child with angels in the Victoria and Albert Museum is attributed to him
- a panel (1427) for San Francesco al Prato (lost)
- work carried out for the Ospedale di Santa Maria della Misericordia in 1434 (lost)
- a panel (1435) for Giovanni di Martino Bontempi for the Cappella degli Angeli of San Domenico (lost)
