= Self-Portrait with a Friend =

Painting by Raphael

Self-Portrait with a Friend (Double Portrait)
- Artist: Raphael
- Year: 1518–1520
- Medium: Oil on canvas
- Dimensions: 99 cm × 83 cm (39 in × 33 in)
- Location: Louvre, Paris

The Self-Portrait with a Friend (also known as Double Portrait and as Raphael and His Fencing Master) is a painting by Italian High Renaissance painter Raphael. It dates to 1518–1520, and is in the Louvre Museum of Paris, France. Whether the figure on the left is actually a self-portrait by Raphael is uncertain, although it was already identified as such in a 16th-century print.

== History ==
The identity of the man portrayed before Raphael is unknown. Traditionally he was identified as his fencing master, since he holds the hilt of a sword. Modern art historians consider him a close friend, or possibly one of the painter's pupils, perhaps Polidoro da Caravaggio or Giulio Romano. One possibility is Giovanni Battista Branconio, for whom Raphael had designed, in the Borgo quarter of Rome, the now destroyed Palazzo Branconio. Other people associated with the character include Pietro Aretino, Baldassarre Peruzzi and Antonio da Sangallo the Younger, as well as other painters such as Il Pordenone or Pontormo, but these hypotheses have been refuted by other portraits.

A significant portion of the painting seems to have been executed by one of Raphael's pupils.

The painting was owned by Francis I of France and, in the past, was assigned to other artists, including Sebastiano del Piombo.

== See also ==
- Self-portraiture
- List of paintings by Raphael

== Sources ==
- De Vecchi, Pierluigi (1975). Raffaello. Milan: Rizzoli.
