= Li Zai =

Chinese painter

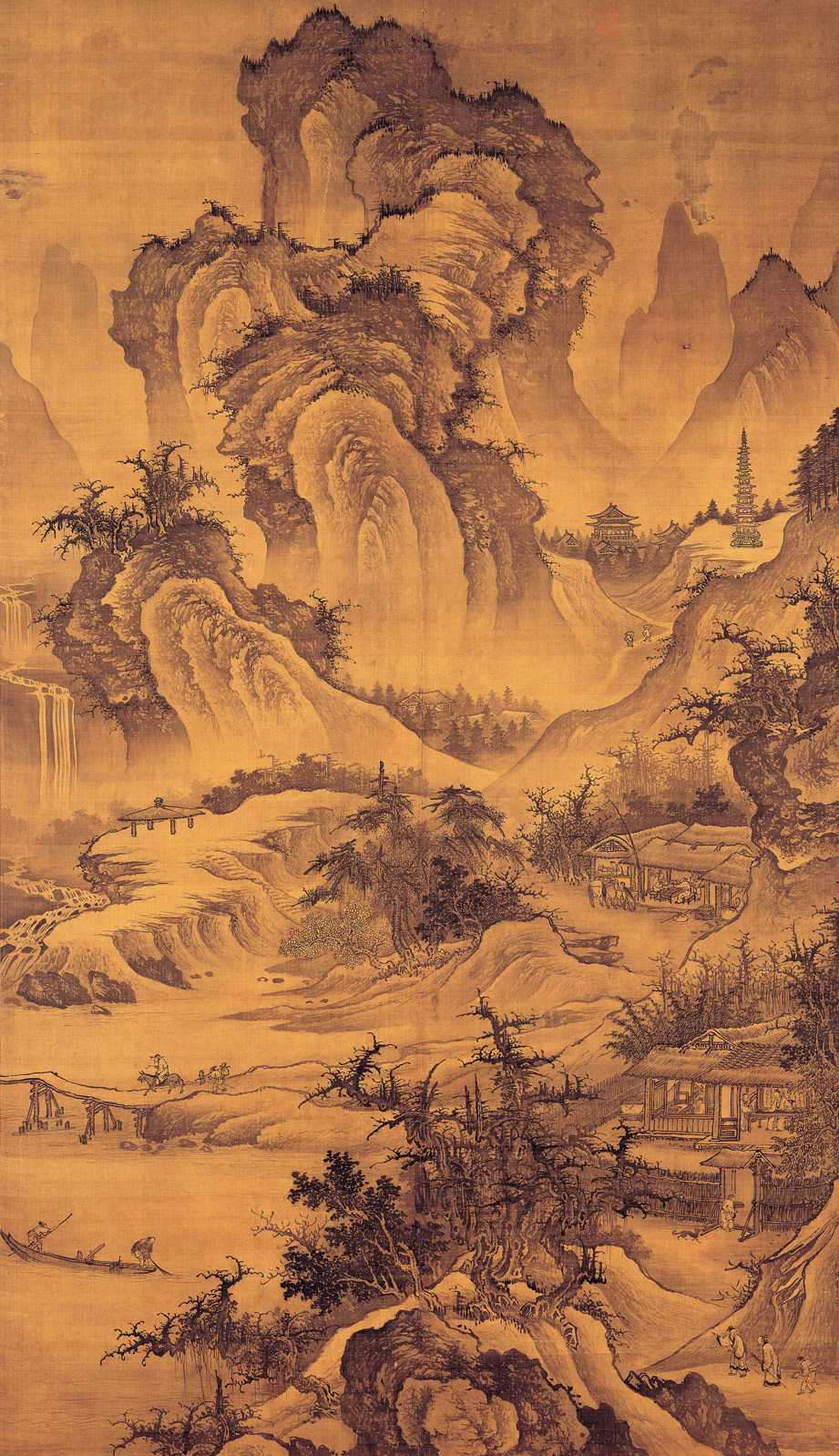
Mountain Hamlet, Lofty Retreat, National Palace Museum

Li Zai (Chinese: 李在; pinyin: Lǐ Zài; Wade–Giles: Li Tsai); ca. (unknown-1431) was a Chinese painter of landscapes and human figures during the Ming dynasty (1368–1644). His specific birth year is not known.

Li was born in Putian in Fujian province and active during the Xuande era. His style name was 'Yizheng' (以政). Li's painting followed the style of Guo Xi, Ma Yuan, and Xia Gui.
