= Giovanni Battista Barca =

Italian painter

Giovanni Battista Barca, or Giovanni Battista Barchi, (1594-1650) was an Italian painter of the Baroque period. He was born in Mantua, but became a citizen of Verona. He appears to have been a pupil of Domenico Fetti.

He painted a Pietà for San Fermo Maggiore; a Virgin for the altar of the Carli in San Nicolò; a Saints John the Baptists, Andrew, Mary Magdalen, and Jerome and a two Martyrdoms of Saints Crispino and Crispiniano for the church of Santa Maria della Scala; a Visitation of the Virgin for the main chapel of the church of the Vittoria; and a St John Evangelist for the church of San Giovanni della Beverara; and a Martyrdom of St. Paul Miki and companions; and a Madonna with Saints Francis and John the Baptist for San Bernardino.
