= Vilain =

Vilain is both a given name and a surname. Notable people with the name include:

- Vilain I of Aulnay (died c. 1269), French knight
- Vilain XIIII, Belgian noble family
- Eric Vilain (born 1966), French physician-scientist and professor
- Luiji Vilain (born 1998), American football player
- Rob Vilain, Dutch curler
