= A. C. de la Mare =

English librarian & palaeographer (1932–2001)

Albinia Catherine de la Mare OBE FBA
- Born: 2 June 1932; London, England
- Died: 19 December 2001 (aged 69); Oxford, England

Academic background
- Education: University of Oxford
- Thesis: Vespasiano da Bisticci, Historian and Bookseller (1965)
- Doctoral advisor: Ernst Gombrich

Academic work
- Discipline: Palaeography and codicology
- Institutions: King's College London; Bodleian Library

Albinia Catherine de la Mare, OBE, FBA (2 June 1932 – 19 December 2001), known in print as A.C. de la Mare and informally as "Tilly", was an English librarian and palaeographer who specialised in Italian Renaissance manuscripts.

== Personal life ==
Born in Gower Street, London, in 1932, she was the daughter of Richard de la Mare, director of Faber and Faber, and the granddaughter of the poet Walter de la Mare. In 1937 her family moved to an eighteenth century brick house in Much Hadham where Tilly and her younger brothers were raised. Motivated by "a strong sense of public duty", as an adult she "serv[ed] in the Civil Defence Corps to be the better prepared to help in the event of any disaster". Following a long illness, she died at Oxford in 2001.

== Education and career ==
After attending a local school in Much Hadham, de la Mare departed for a final three years at Queen's College, Harley Street, then read history at Lady Margaret Hall, University of Oxford. In 1954, she registered as a postgraduate student at the Warburg Institute, London. Her M.A. thesis — examining the Vite di uomini illustri of Florentine bookseller Vespasiano da Bisticci, and striving to trace the manuscripts he published — proved so promising that her supervisor, Ernst Gombrich, promoted her to a PhD dissertation under his own supervision. "It took a long time to materialise. Formally presented in 1965–66, it really lasted the rest of her life".

As curator in the Manuscript Department of the Bodleian Library from 1962 until 1989, de la Mare became so respected that King's College London Professor of Palaeography Julian Brown "decreed on his deathbed that Tilly de la Mare and no one else should succeed him". In 1989, she was duly appointed to the latter institution's Chair of Palaeography, where she soon garnered praise for her "enthusiastic", "inspirational" lecturing style. She retired from the post in 1997.

From 1990 through 2000, de la Mare served as a counsellor to the Bureau of the prestigious Comité International de Paléographie Latine (CIPL), a scholarly organisation of which she was a committed and active member. Elected a Fellow of the British Academy (FBA) in 1987, she was appointed an Officer of the Order of the British Empire (OBE) in 1993. The Warburg Institute held an academic conference commemorating her life and work in 2012, and 2016 brought publication of a volume of scholarly essays dedicated to her memory.

== Selected publications ==
=== Books authored ===
- Vespasiano da Bisticci, Historian and Bookseller. PhD diss. U London, 1965.
- Catalogue of the Collection of Medieval Manuscripts Bequeathed to the Bodleian Library, Oxford by James P.R. Lyell. Oxford: Clarendon, 1971.
- (with Terence Alan Martyn Bishop). English Caroline Minuscule. Oxford: Clarendon, 1971. Oxford Palaeographical Handbooks.
- The Shop of a Florentine 'Cartolaio' in 1426. Firenze: L. Olschki, 1973.
- The Handwriting of Italian Humanists, Vol. 1, Fasc. 1: Francesco Petrarca, Giovanni Boccaccio, Coluccio Salutati, Niccolò Niccoli, Poggio Bracciolini, Bartolomeo Aragazzi of Montepulciano, Sozomeno of Pistoia, Giorgio Antonio Vespucci. Oxford: University Press for Association Internationale de Bibliophilie, 1973. Handwriting of Italian Humanists 1, fasc. 1.
- Humanistic Hands in England. Oxford: Bodleian Library, 1980.
- Further Italian Illuminated Manuscripts in the Bodleian Library. Firenze: Leo S. Olschki, 1985.
- Duke Humfrey's Library & the Divinity School at Oxford, 1488–1988: Catalogue of an Exhibition at the Bodleian Library, June–August 1988. Oxford: Bodleian, 1988.
- Vespasiano da Bisticci as Producer of Classical Manuscripts in Fifteenth-Century Florence. London: Red Gull, 1996.
- (with Laura Nuvoloni). The Handwriting of Italian Humanists 2: Bartolomeo Sanvito: The Life and Work of a Renaissance Scribe. Paris: Association Internationale de Bibliophilie, 2009. Handwriting of Italian Humanists 2.

=== Books edited ===
- (with B. C. Barker-Benfield). Manuscripts at Oxford: An Exhibition in Memory of Richard William Hunt, 1908–1979: Keeper of Western Manuscripts at the Bodleian Library, Oxford, 1945–1975, On Themes Selected and Described by Some of His Friends. Oxford: Bodleian, 1980.

=== Chapters and articles ===
- (with D.F.S. Thomson). "Poggio's Earliest Manuscript?" Italia Medioevale e Umanistica 16 (1973): 179–95.
- "Humanistic Script: The First Ten Years". In: Das Verhältnis der Humanisten zum Buch. Ed. F. Kraft and D. Wuttke. Boppard, 1977. pp. 89–110. Mitteilungen der Kommission für Humanismusforschung der Deutschen Forschungsgemeinschaft 4. [Sonderdruck].
- (with Lotte Hellinga). "The First Book Printed in Oxford: The Expositio Symboli of Rufinus". Transactions of the Cambridge Bibliographical Society 7.2 (1978): 184–244.
- "Script and Manuscripts in Milan under Sforzas". In: Milano nell'Età di Ludovico il Moro: Atti del Convegno Internazionale, 28 febbraio–4 marzo 1983. Vol. 2. Milano: Comune di Milano, Archivio Storico Civico e Biblioteca Trivulziana, 1983. pp. 399–408.
- "Marginalia and Glosses in the Manuscripts of Bartolomeo Sanvito of Padua". In: Talking to the Text: Marginalia from Papyri to Print: Proceedings of a Conference Held at Erice, 26 September–3 October 1998, as the 12th Course of International School for the Study of Written Records. Ed. Vincenzo Fera, Silvia Rizzo, and Giacomo Ferraù. Messina: Centro Interdipartimentale di Studi Umanistici, 2002. pp. 459–555. Percorsi dei Classici 4–5.
