= Ni Duan =

Imperial Chinese painter in the Ming dynasty

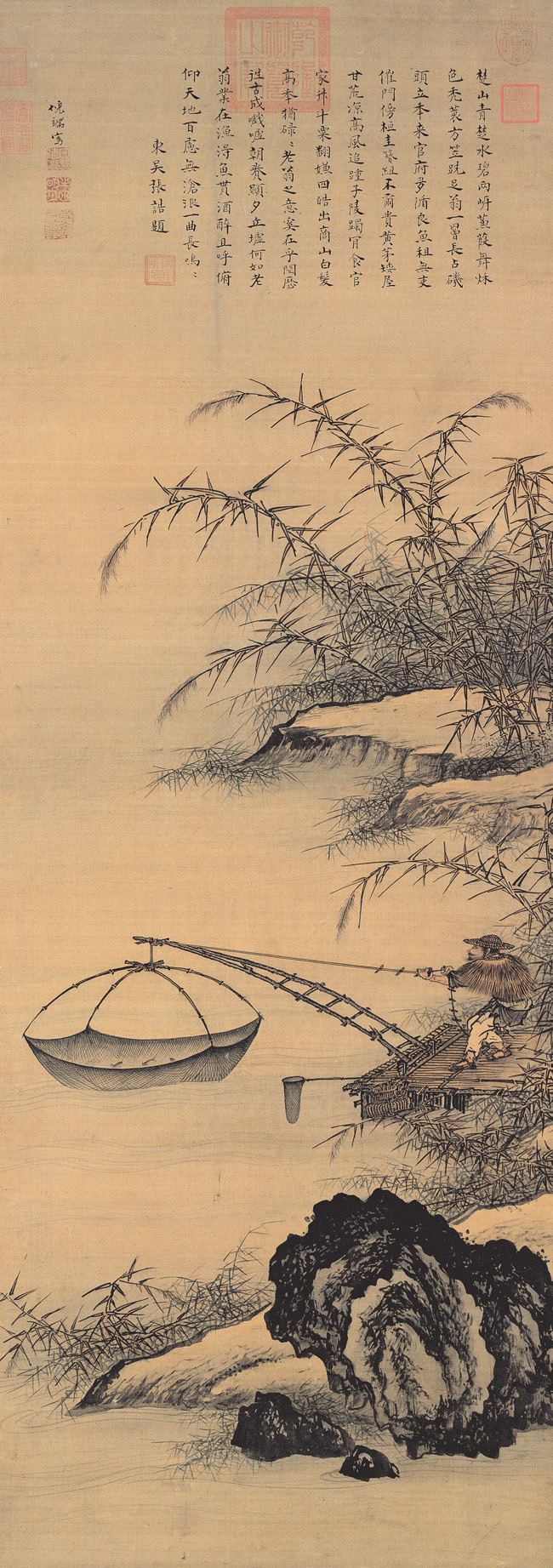
Ni Duan, Catching Fish, National Palace Museum

Ni Duan (Chinese: 倪端; pinyin: Ní Duān; Wade–Giles: Ni Tuan; (1436–1505), style name as Zhongzheng (仲正), was an imperial Chinese painter in the Ming dynasty.

Ni Duan as born in Hangzhou. He excelled in paintings of people and landscapes.
