= Saint Lanfranc Enthroned Between Saints John the Baptist and Liberius =

Painting by Cima da Conegliano

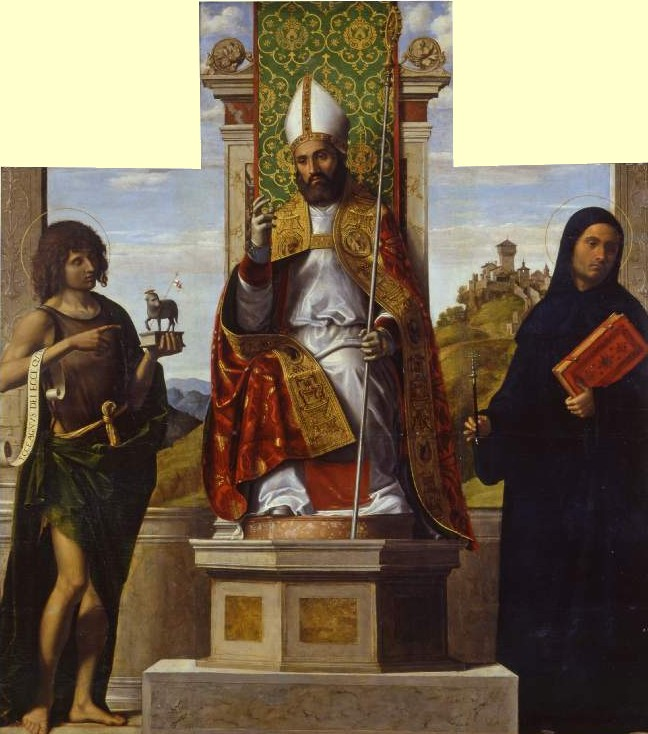
- Artist: Cima da Conegliano
- Year: c. 1515–1516
- Medium: Oil on panel
- Dimensions: 144 cm × 128.5 cm (57 in × 50.6 in)
- Location: Fitzwilliam Museum, Cambridge

Saint Lanfranc Enthroned Between Saints John the Baptist and Liberius is an oil painting by Cima da Conegliano dating to c. 1515–1516. It is now in the Fitzwilliam Museum, Cambridge. It shows Saint Lanfranc on a throne, between John the Baptist and Saint Liberius.
