= Simone Papa the Elder =

Italian painter

Simone Papa the Elder (1430–1488) was an Italian painter of the Renaissance period, active in Naples.

He is said to have been a scholar of Antonio Solario. Of all the Neapolitan painters, he is said to be the one adhering closest to the style of Jan van Eyck. He painted the Archangel Michael and Saints found at the Capodimonte Museum. Other works attributed to Simone include an Annunciation for the no longer extant church of San Nicola alla Dogana, a Virgin and savior with saints for the church of San Lorenzo, and a St Michael defeating rebel angels for the church of Santa Maria Nuova.
