= Antonio Bernieri (painter) =

Italian painter

Antonio Bernieri (1516–1564) was an Italian painter of the Renaissance period. He was born in Correggio. He was first trained under Correggio; on the death of that master he went to Venice, and attended Titian's school. He visited Rome, and returning to Venice worked there until 1563. He died at Correggio. Bernieri was an eminent painter of portrait miniatures. He is sometimes called 'Antonio da Correggio', which confuses him with his mentor.
