= Portrait of a Young Woman with a Unicorn =

Painting by Raphael

- Portrait of a Lady with a Unicorn
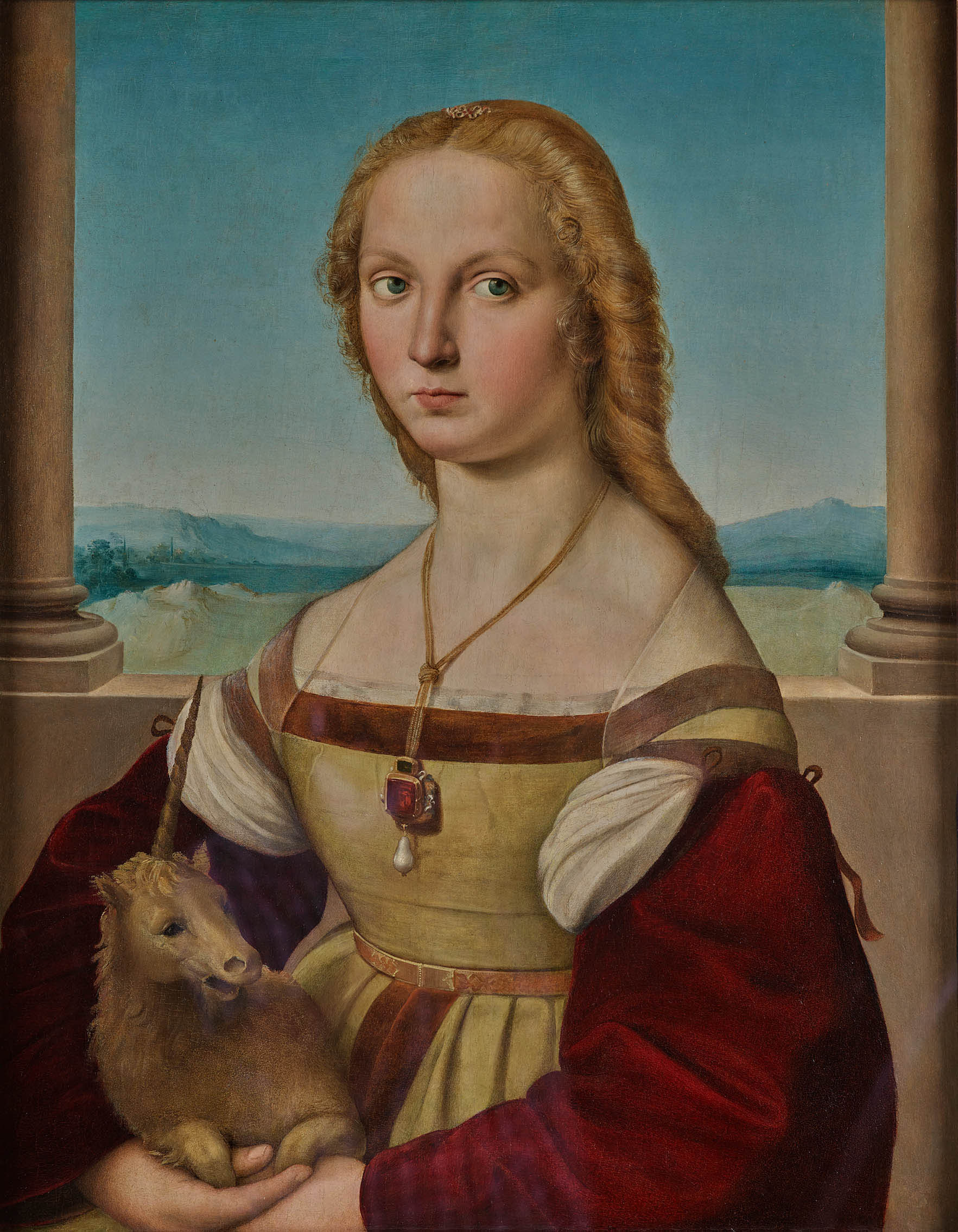
- Artist: Raphael
- Year: c. 1505-1506
- Type: Originally oil on panel; now on canvas
- Dimensions: 65 cm × 51 cm (26 in × 20 in)
- Location: Galleria Borghese, Rome

Portrait of a Young Woman with a Unicorn (La dama con liocorno) is a painting by Raphael depicting an unmarried young lady holding a small unicorn. Art historians date its creation to around 1505-1506. It is held in the Galleria Borghese in Rome.

== History ==
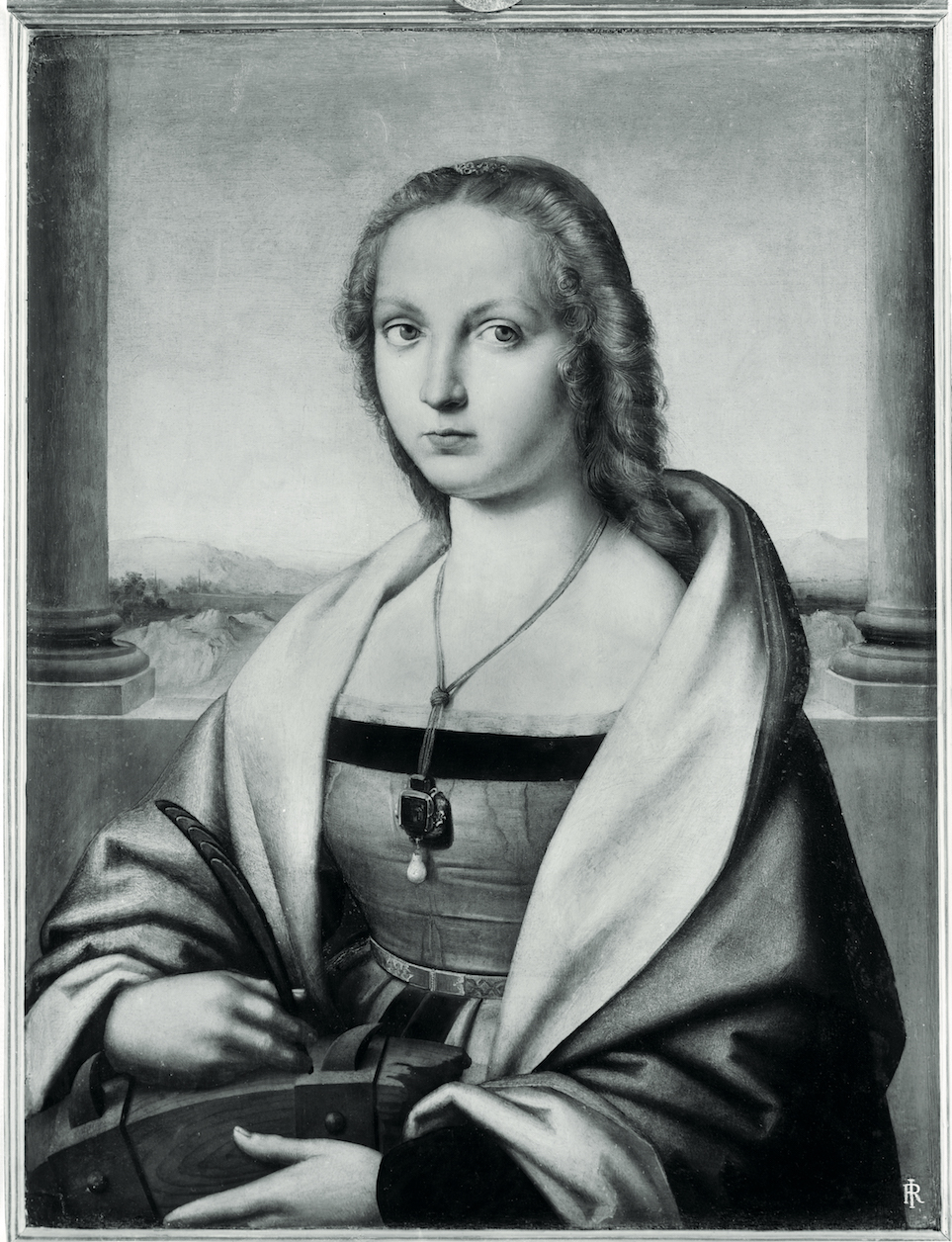
How the painting appeared from the late 17th century until its 1934–1936 restoration. The subject has a cloak added to cover her shoulders, the unicorn is obscured, and she is now holding the breaking wheel iconography of St. Catherine of Alexandria.

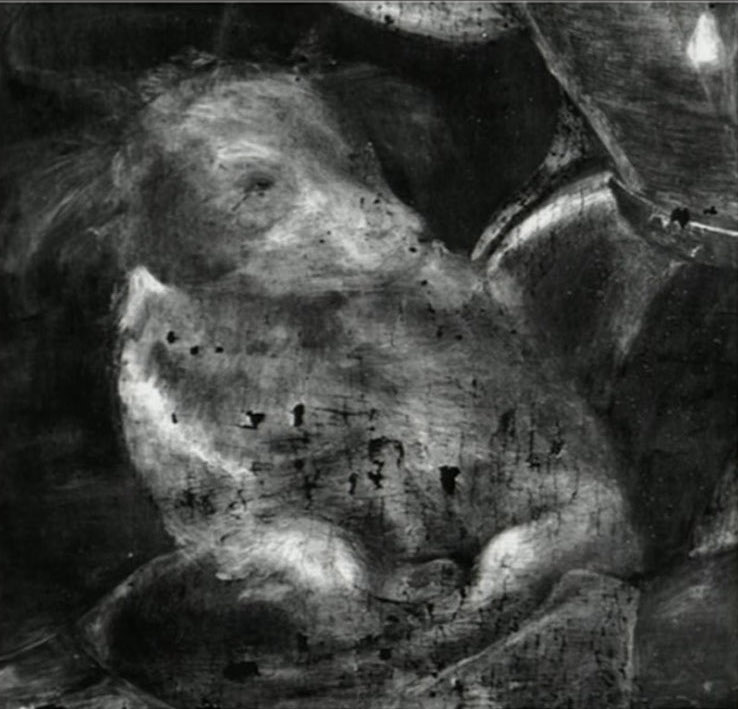
The dog found in later restoration work. The ears of the dog are visible today as pentimenti on the lady's sleeve.

The painting was originally oil on panel. The composition of the picture—placing the figure in a loggia opening out onto a landscape, the three-quarter length format—was apparently inspired by the Mona Lisa, painted by Leonardo between 1503 and 1506 in Florence. Christof Thoenes writes: "However unabashedly Raphael adopts the pose, compositional framework and spatial organization of the Leonardo portrait...the cool watchfulness in the young woman's gaze is very different" from the "enigmatic ambiguity" of Mona Lisa. The portrait was painted around the same time as Raphael's Portrait of Maddalena Doni, most likely a little after.

The unicorn was traditionally a symbol of chastity. Given this symbolism, it is possible the portrait was commissioned as a betrothal or marriage portrait, demonstrating the bride's virtue, virginity, and untainted nature. This would show her as a suitable and attractive marriage candidate.

One speculation of her identity is Laura Orsini della Rovere, who would have been 12 or 13 years old in 1505–1506 and thus of freshly marriage age for the era. This is largely due to her family being able to afford such a piece, as well as the unicorn being a symbol of her noble house. This is ultimately only speculation though, with no direct proof of such a connection.

At some point around 1682, an unknown artist embarked upon a major modification to the piece. While the figure was still obviously an Italian Renaissance woman, they added in iconography for the 4th-century Greco-Egyptian martyr Saint Catherine of Alexandria. The unicorn was overpainted with a torture wheel that "Catherine" was now inexplicably holding, and a heavy cloak was added obscuring her bare shoulders, presumably for reasons of modesty. A martyr's palm frond was put into her other hand. This repainting caused laters to misattribute the work; a 1760 inventory of the Gallery accepted the identification of the subject as Saint Catherine and attributed the work to Perugino.

In 1927, Roberto Longhi proposed that the work was created by Raphael, rather than Perugino, and called for closer investigation of the overpainting. The painting was transferred to canvas during conservation work in 1934. During the 1934–1936 transfer and restoration, the 17th-century overpainting was discovered. The original Raphael version was then restored, revealing the unicorn, and removing the wheel, cloak, and palm frond. Further restoration work on the painting in 1959 revealed through radiography the image of a small dog, a symbol of conjugal fidelity, under the unicorn. It served as a sketch for the final appearance of the unicorn. However, Raphael never finished the dog, and it was not visible in the finished product.

== See also ==
- List of paintings by Raphael
