= 1270s in art =

- 1260s
- 1270s in art
- 1280s
Other topics in 1270s:
- Music

Art timeline

The decade of the 1270s in art involved some significant events.

== Architecture ==
- Église Saint-Maurice, Soultz-Haut-Rhin started (completed in 1489)

== Art ==
- 1275: Cimabue completes Mezzo Crucifix

== Births ==
- 1272: Cao Zhibai – Chinese painter and bibliophile from the Yuan dynasty (died 1355)
- c.1275: Lorenzo Maitani – Italian architect and sculptor primarily responsible for the construction and decoration of the façade of Orvieto Cathedral (died 1330)

== Deaths ==
- 1270: Mu Xi – Chinese landscape painter during the Song dynasty (born 1210)
- 1276: Coppo di Marcovaldo – Italian painter (born 1225)
- 1278: Lanxi Daolong – Chinese Buddhist monk, calligrapher and philosopher (born 1213)
- 1279: Wuzhun Shifan – Chinese painter, calligrapher, and prominent Zen Buddhist monk (born 1178)
