= 1410s in art =

- 1400s
- 1410s in art
- 1420s
Other topics in 1410s:
- Music

Art timeline

The decade of the 1410s in art involved some significant events.

== Events ==
- Across Europe, frescoes and tapestries are produced.
- c. 1410: Starting point of the most celebrated decade in Hubert van Eyck's activity.
- c. 1410: John, Duke of Berry, commissions the Très Riches Heures du Duc de Berry, illustrated by the Limbourg brothers between c. 1412 and 1416.
- 1416: Nanni di Banco, guild member of the Masters of Stone and Wood, installs his "Four Crowned Martyr Saints" at the Orsanmichele guild hall in Florence.
- 1418: Brunelleschi and Ghiberti submit plans for the dome of Florence Cathedral.
- 1419: Brunelleschi designs the loggia of the Ospedale degli Innocenti in Florence.
- 1419: The marble Fonte Gaia in the Piazza del Campo of Siena is sculpted by Jacopo della Quercia. His figures of Rhea Silvia and Acca Larentia are the first two female nudes (other than Eve or repentant saints) to stand in a public place since Antiquity.

== Paintings ==
1410: Andrei Rublev – Christ the Redeemer

- c. 1410: Madonna of Zlatá Koruna painted.
- c. 1410: Robert Campin paints The Entombment.
- c. 1410: Lorenzo Monaco paints Moses.
- 1410: Jan van Eyck paints Nativity.
- c. 1410: Andrei Rublev paints his Christ the Redeemer icon.
- c. 1410–1420: Andrei Rublev paints his Trinity icon for the Trinity Lavra of St. Sergius (now in Tretyakov Gallery, Moscow).
- 1412: A painting of Democritus is made; it will be exhibited four centuries later, at the Northwestern Fair in Chicago on October 27, 1863.
- c. 1412: The 'Master of Boucicaut' paints a Portrait of Charles VI of France.
- 1413: In Florence (Italy), Lorenzo paints his masterpiece of the large Coronation (in the Uffizi) for the high altar of his own Church of the Convent of Santa Maria degli Angeli, in Florence.
- 1413: Taddeo di Bartolo paints the vestibule of the chapel in Siena (Italy).
- 1414: Lorenzo Monaco paints Coronation of the Virgin at the Church of the Convent of Santa Maria degli Angeli, in Florence (Italy).
- 1414 or 1418: Jan van Eyck paints Portrait of a Moorish King or Prince.
- 1418: Matteo da Siena paints The Slaughter of the Innocents.
- 1418: In Lublin, the Gothic and Renaissance Chapel of the Holy Trinity is covered with Russo-Byzantine frescoes.
- 1418: Giacomo Jaquerio paints frescoes in the chateau of Pinerolo.

== Sculpture ==
- 1411–1413: Donatello completes St. Mark, Or San Michele, Florence.
- 1411–1419: Conrad von Einbeck produces sculptures for the church of St. Moritz, Halle, in the Electorate of Saxony: Schellenmoritz (Bell Maurice, 1411); Schmerzensmann (Man of Sorrows, 1416); Klagende Maria (Mourning Mary, 1419); Christus an der Geißelsäule (Christ at the Column, 1419); and a bust.
- c. 1410–1414: Nanni di Banco, Four Saints (Quattro Coronati), at Or San Michele, Florence.
- 1415–1417: Donatello creates St. George Tabernacle, Museo Nazionale del Bargello, Florence.
- 1415–1417: Claus de Werve creates Virgin and Child of Poligny, Metropolitan Museum of Art, New York.
- 1419: Jacopino da Tradate executes the statue of Pope Martin V for the Duomo of Milan.
- 1419: Jacopo della Quercia finishes the Fonte Gaia fountain in Piazza del Campo, at Siena (Italy).

== Births ==
- 1410: Enguerrand Quarton – French painter (died 1466)
- 1410: Johannes Mentelin – German calligrapher, book scribe and printmaker (died 1478)
- 1410: Vecchietta – Siennese painter (died 1480)
- 1410: Cristoforo di Geremia – Italian medalist (died 1476)
- 1410: Domenico Veneziano – Italian painter of the early Renaissance (died 1461)
- 1410: Joos van Wassenhove – Early Netherlandish painter who later worked in Italy (died 1480)
- 1410/1415: Albert van Ouwater – Early Netherlandish painter working in the Northern Netherlands (died 1475)
- 1410/1420: Dieric Bouts – Early Netherlandish painter (died 1475)
- 1410/1420: Petrus Christus – Netherlandish painter active in Bruges (died 1475/1476)
- 1412: Piero della Francesca – Italian artist of the Early Renaissance (died 1492)
- 1412: Zanobi Strozzi – Italian painter and miniaturist (died 1468)
- 1413: Jean de la Huerta – Spanish sculptor (died 1462)
- 1413/1414: Pietro Vannini – Italian artist and silversmith (died 1495/1496)
- 1414: Tenshō Shūbun – Japanese painter in the Muromachi period and a Zen Buddhist monk (died 1463)
- 1415: Giovanni Antonio Bellinzoni da Pesaro – Italian painter of the Renaissance (died 1477)
- 1416: Lin Liang – Chinese painter of plum, flower, and fruit works during the Ming Dynasty (died 1480)
- 1416/1417: Antonio Missaglia – Italian armourer (died 1495/1496)
- 1417: Domenico di Michelino – Italian painter of the Florentine school (died 1491)
- 1417: Kang Hŭian – Korean scholar and painter of the early Joseon period (died 1464)
- 1418: Agostino di Duccio – Italian early Renaissance sculptor (died 1481)
- 1418: Zanobi Machiavelli – Italian early Renaissance painter (died 1479)
- 1419: Neri di Bicci – painter in Florence (died 1491)

== Deaths ==
- 1416: Limbourg brothers – Dutch Renaissance miniature painters (born 1385)
- 1416: Jacopo d'Avanzi – Italian fresco painter (born unknown)
- 1416: Wang Fu – Chinese landscape painter, calligrapher, and poet during the Ming Dynasty (born 1362)
- 1415: Xie Jin – Chinese painter and calligrapher (born 1369)
- 1415: Jean Malouel – Netherlandish artist, court painter of Philip the Bold (born 1365)
- 1415: Niccolò di Pietro Gerini – Italian painter of the late Gothic period – (born 1340)
- 1414: Jacquemart de Hesdin – French miniature painter working in the Late Gothic style (born 1355)
- 1414: Andrea Vanni – Italian painter active mainly in his native Siena (born 1332)
- 1412: Martino da Verona – Italian painter (born unknown)
- 1411: Paolo di Giovanni Fei – Italian painter of the Sienese School (born 1345)
- 1411: Melchior Broederlam – Early Netherlandish painter (born 1355)
- 1411: Jacques Coene – Flemish painter, illustrator, and architect (born unknown)
- 1410: Filippo Scannabecchi – Italian painter of primarily religious themed works (born 1360)
- 1410: Bartolo di Fredi – Siennese painter (born ca.1330)
- 1410: Theophanes the Greek – Muscovite painter (born ca.1340)
- 1410: Spinello Aretino – Italian painter of frescoes (born 1350)
