= 1210s in art =

- 1200s
- 1210s in art
- 1220s
Other topics in 1210s:
- Music

Art timeline

The decade of the 1210s in art involved some significant events.

== Art ==
- 1210: Iraqi painter – Two Galloping Horsemen

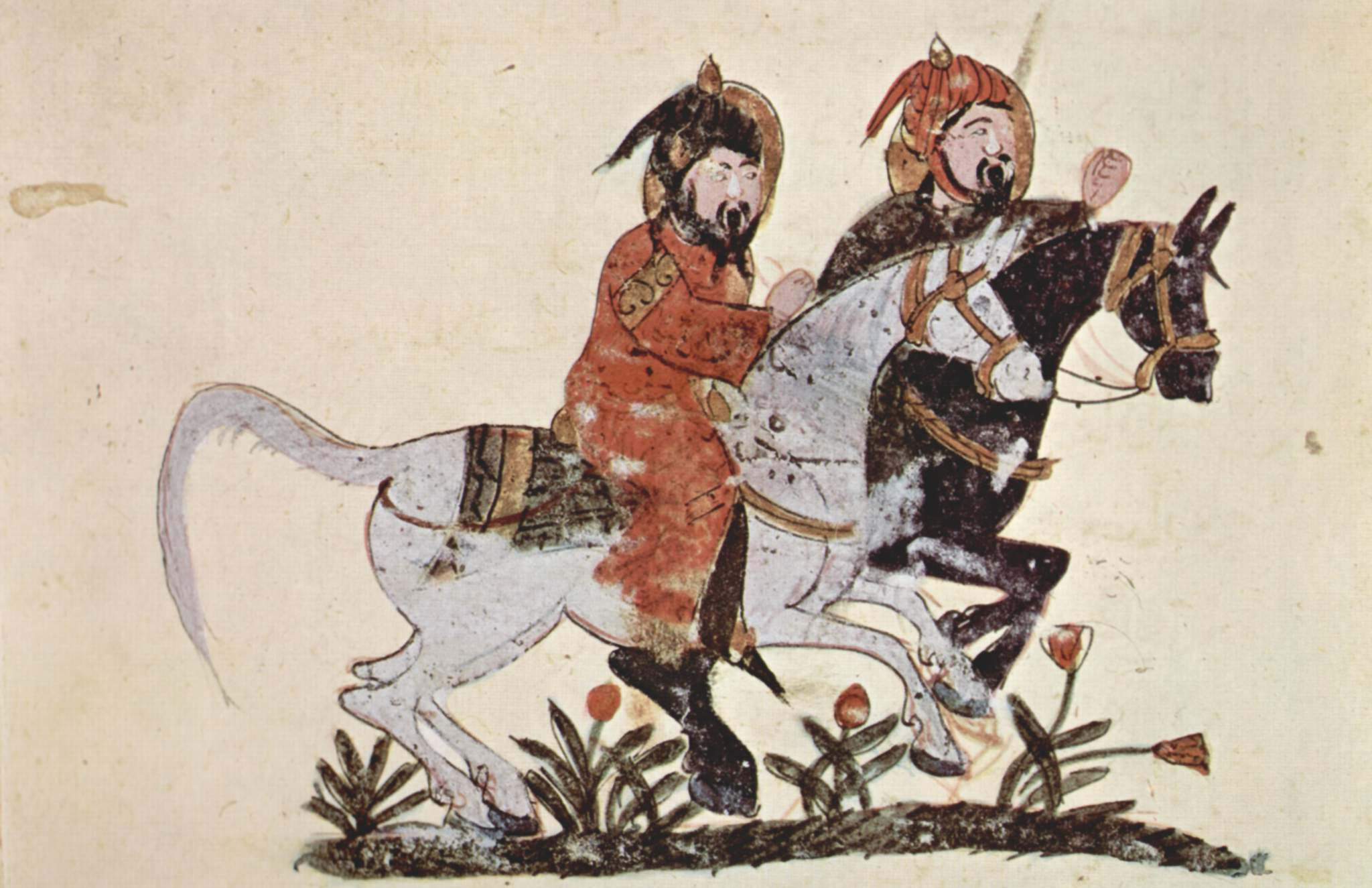
A scene from the book of Ahmad ibn al-Husayn ibn al-Ahnaf, showing two galloping horsemen by an Iraqi painter, 1210

- 1212: Unkei sculpts Miroku Bosatsu in Kōfuku-ji
- 1216: Kōben sculpts statues of Tentōki and Ryūtōki, who carry lanterns as offering to the Historical Buddha at Kōfuku-ji

== Births ==
- 1215: Bonaventura Berlinghieri – Italian painter of the Gothic period (died 1242)
- 1213: Jacopo Cosmati – Roman architect and sculptor, and worker in decorative geometric mosaic (died 1293)
- 1213: Lanxi Daolong – Chinese Buddhist monk, calligrapher and philosopher (died 1278)
- 1210: Muqi Fachang – Chinese Zen Buddhist monk and renowned painter (died 1269)
- 1210: Mu Xi – Chinese landscape painter during the Song dynasty (died 1270)
- 1210: Cosimo Cosmati – Roman architect and sculptor, and worker in decorative geometric mosaic (died 1235)

== Deaths ==
- 1210: Liang Kai – Chinese painter, (born 1140), also known as Madman Liang
