= 1230s in art =

- 1220s
- 1230s in art
- 1240s
Other topics in 1230s:
- Music

Art timeline

The decade of the 1230s in art involved some significant events.

== Events ==
- 1239: First record of Mabel of Bury St. Edmunds, English embroiderer.

== Paintings ==
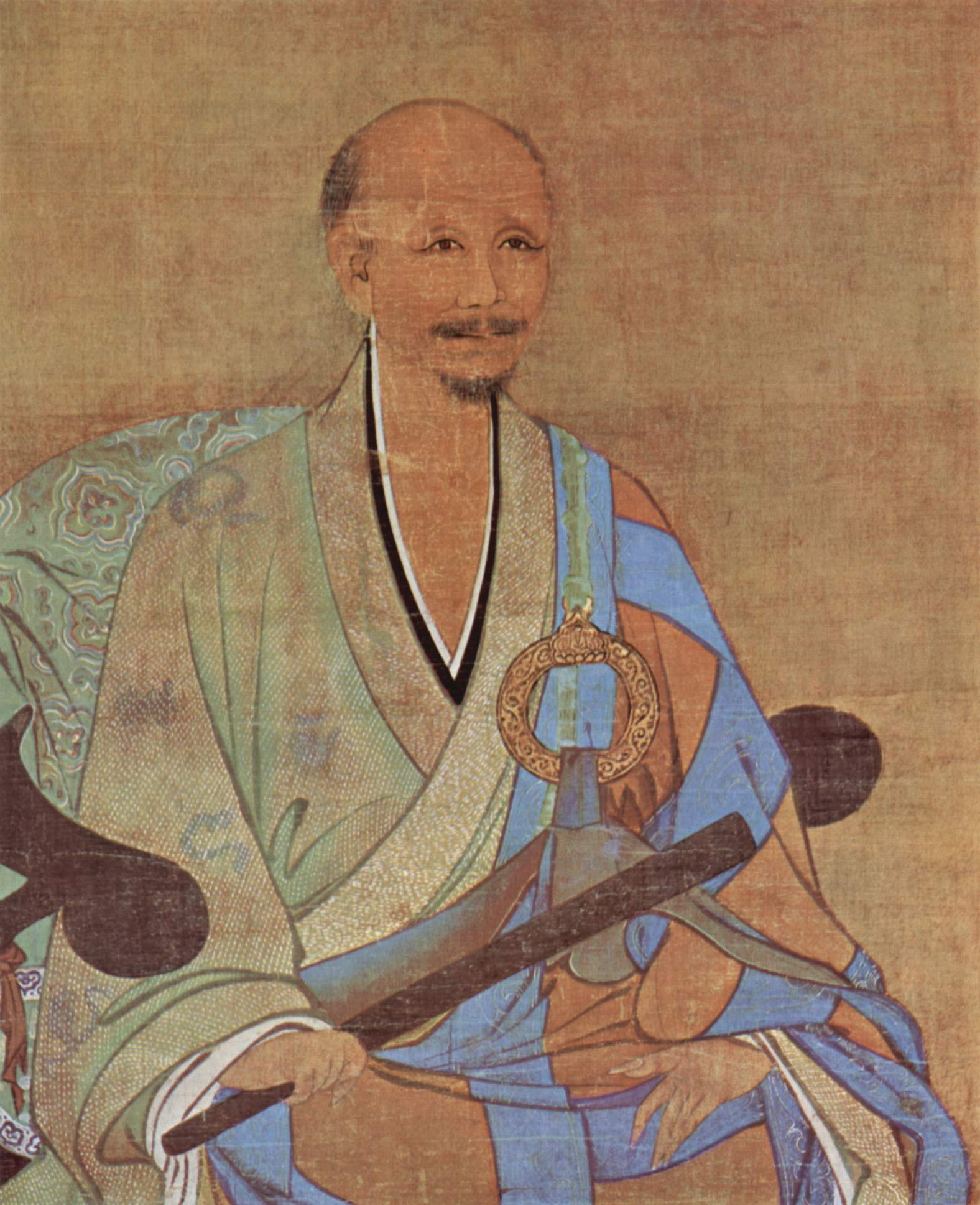
Wuzhun Shifan Self-portrait, 1238.

- 1238: Wuzhun Shifan – Self-portrait
- 1237: Yahya ibn Mahmud al-Wasiti – Maqamat (meetings) of the al-Hariri
- 1235: Bonaventura Berlinghieri – St. Francis

== Births ==
- 1239: Gaddo Gaddi, Florentine painter and mosaicist in a gothic art style (died 1312)
- 1238: Guglielmo Agnelli, Pisan-born sculptor and architect (died 1313)
- 1235: Qián Xuǎn, Chinese loyalist painter from Zhejiang during the Southern Song dynasty (died 1305)
- 1235: Chen Rong, Chinese painter during the Southern Song dynasty (died 1262)

== Deaths ==
- 1235: Cosimo Cosmati, Roman architect, sculptor and worker in decorative geometric mosaic (born 1210)
- 1230: Benedetto Antelami, Italian architect and sculptor of the Romanesque school (born 1150)
