= 1260s in art =

- 1250s
- 1260s in art
- 1270s
Other topics in 1260s:
- Music

Art timeline

The decade of the 1260s in art involved some significant events.

== Events ==
- 1268: Earliest known reference to a guild of stainers, predecessors of the Worshipful Company of Painter-Stainers, in the City of London.

== Paintings ==
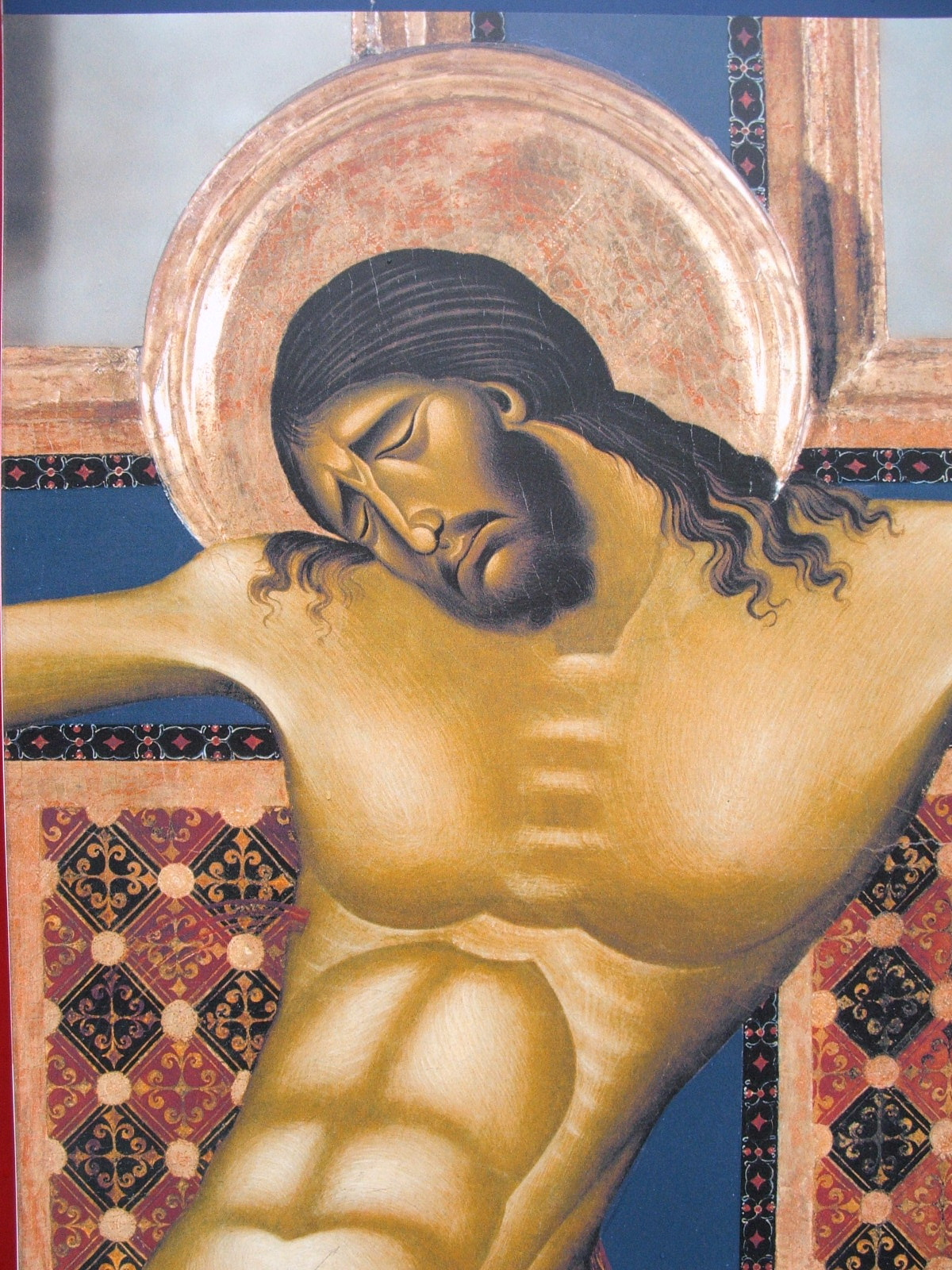
Cimabue's Crucifix, Chiesa di san Domenico, Arezzo, 1265/1268

== Births ==
- 1269: Huang Gongwang – Chinese painter from Jiangsu during the Yuan Dynasty (died 1354)
- 1267: Giotto – Italian painter and architect from Florence (died 1337)
- 1262: Guan Daosheng – Chinese woman painter during the Yuan Dynasty (died 1319)
- 1260: Filippo Tesauro – Italian painter active mainly in Naples (died 1320)

== Deaths ==
- 1269: Muqi Fachang – Chinese Zen Buddhist monk and renowned painter (born 1210)
- 1265: Fujiwara Nobuzane – Japanese nise-e painter (born 1176)
- 1262: Chen Rong – Chinese painter of the Southern Song Dynasty (born 1235)
