= 1240s in art =

- 1230s
- 1240s in art
- 1250s
Other topics in 1240s:
- Music

Art timeline

The decade of the 1240s involved some significant events in art.

== Events ==
- c.1240: Oxford manuscript illuminator William de Brailes incorporates in illustrations to a book of hours and a psalter named self-portraits, among the earliest known.
- 1248: April 26: Consecration of Sainte Chapelle, Paris, noted for its stained glass.

== Paintings ==
- 1244: Chen Rong – Nine Dragons
- 1246: Ma Lin – The Wind in the Pines Listening

== Births ==
- 1240: Cimabue, Italian (Florentine) painter and creator of mosaics (died 1302)
- 1240: Arnolfo di Cambio, Italian architect and sculptor (died 1300/1310)
- 1245: Araniko, Nepalese painter and architect (died 1306)
- 1245: Li Kan, Chinese Yuan dynasty painter (died 1320)
- 1247: Yishan Yining, Chinese Buddhist monk, calligrapher, writer and teacher (died 1317)
- 1248: Gao Kegong, Chinese Yuan dynasty painter (died 1310)

== Deaths ==
- 1249: Wuzhun Shifan, Han Chinese painter, calligrapher and prominent Zen Buddhist (born 1178)
- 1242: Bonaventura Berlinghieri, Italian Gothic painter (born 1215)
- 1241: Fujiwara no Teika, Japanese poet, critic, calligrapher, novelist, anthologist, scribe and scholar (born 1162)
