= 1160s in art =

- 1150s
- 1160s in art
- 1170s

Art timeline

The decade of the 1160s in art involved some significant events.

== Events ==
- 1166: Henry the Lion has the first bronze statue (a heraldic lion) north of the Alps erected at Dankwarderode Castle.

== Births ==
- 1162: Fujiwara no Teika – Japanese poet, critic, calligrapher, novelist, anthologist, scribe, and scholar (died 1241)
- 1160–1165: Ma Yuan – Chinese landscape painter whose work formed the basis of the Ma-Xia school of painting (died 1225)

== Deaths ==
- 1167: Yang Buzhi Chinese master of ink paintings of plum blossoms in the Song dynasty (born 1098)
- 1165: Ibn al-Tilmīdh – Syriac Christian physician, pharmacist, poet, musician and calligrapher (born 1073)
