= 1220s in art =

- 1210s
- 1220s in art
- 1230s
Other topics in 1220s:
- Music

Art timeline

The decade of the 1220s in art involved some significant events.

== Works ==
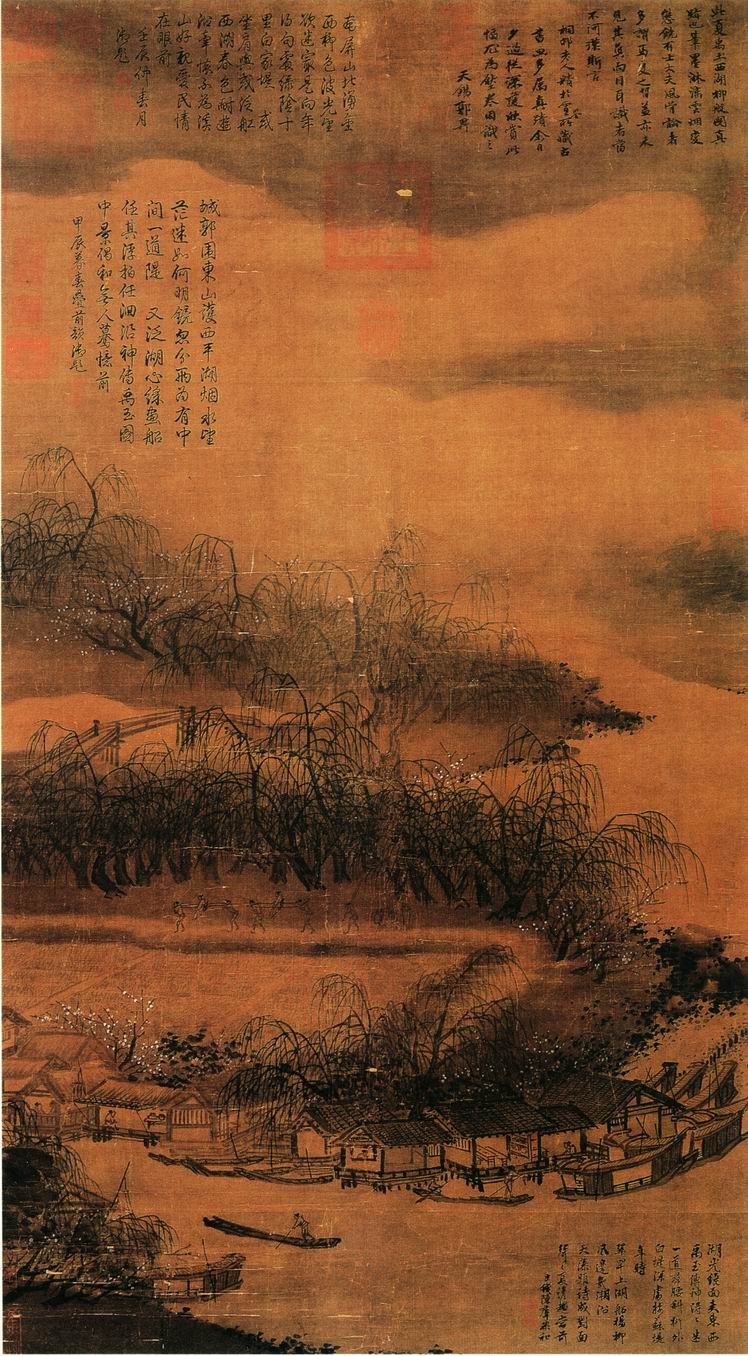
Willows and Boats on West Lake (西湖柳艇图), Xia Gui, c. 1220s

- 1229: Catalan School completes James I the Conqueror Besieging Palma, Majorca
- 1229: The illuminated manuscript Codex Gigas is completed
- 1227: Anonymous stained glass north transept rose window and lancets at Chartres Cathedral completed
- c. 1225–29?: Bamberg Horseman carved at Bamberg Cathedral
- 1225: Shrine of the Three Kings at Cologne Cathedral completed by Nicholas of Verdun
- 1220: Unknown Kei school sculptor completes Thousand-armed Avalokiteśvara statue in Kōfuku-ji
- c. 1220s: Xia Gui paints Willows and Boats on West Lakes

== Births ==
- 1220/1225: Nicola Pisano – Italian sculptor whose work is noted for its classical Roman sculptural style (died 1284)
- 1222: Gong Kai Chinese government official and later scholar-amateur painter (died 1307)
- 1225: Coppo di Marcovaldo – Italian painter (died 1276)
- 1225: Deodato Cosmati – Roman architect and sculptor, and worker in decorative geometric mosaic (died 1303)

== Deaths ==
- 1223: Unkei – Japanese sculptor (born 1151)
- 1224: Liu Songnian – Song dynasty Chinese artist (born 1174)
- 1225: Xia Gui – Chinese scroll painter of the Song dynasty, great master of the Southern Song landscape style (born 1195)
- 1225: Ma Yuan – Chinese painter of the Song dynasty, of the Ma-Xia school of painting (born 1160–65)
