= 1300s in art =

- 1290s
- 1300s in art
- 1310s
Other topics in 1300s:
- Music

Art timeline

The decade of the 1300s in art involved some significant events.

== Events ==
- 1300: Giotto completes the Badia Polyptych
- 1303: Scrovegni Chapel begun in 1300, is completed. Giotto begins painting a fresco cycle there with scenes from the Old and New Testaments
- 1305: Giotto completes the fresco cycle for the Scrovegni Chapel

== Works ==
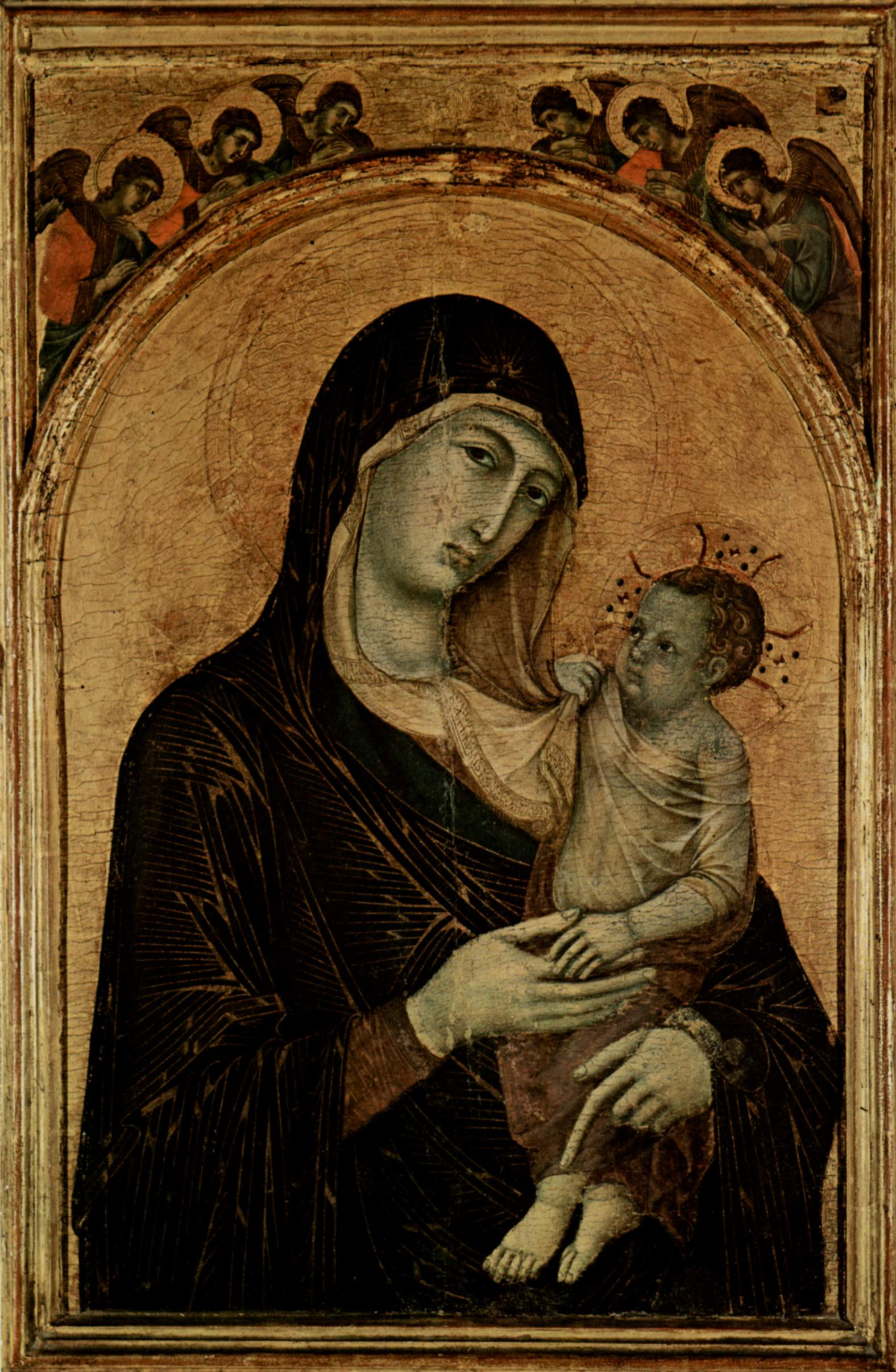
Duccio Madonna with Child 1300

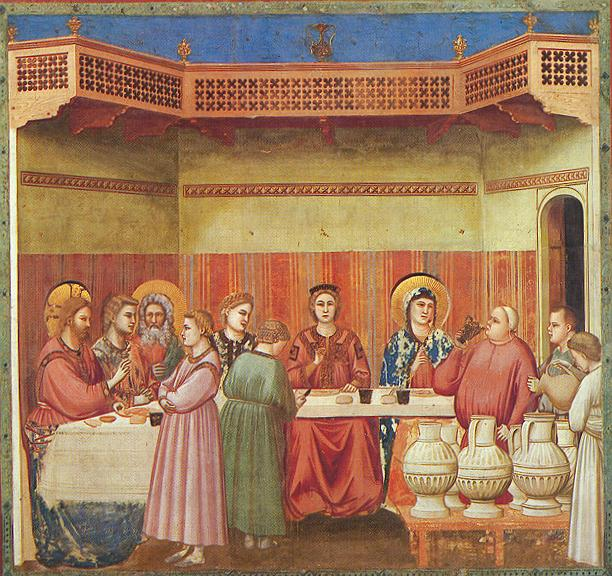
Giotto The Marriage at Cana 1303

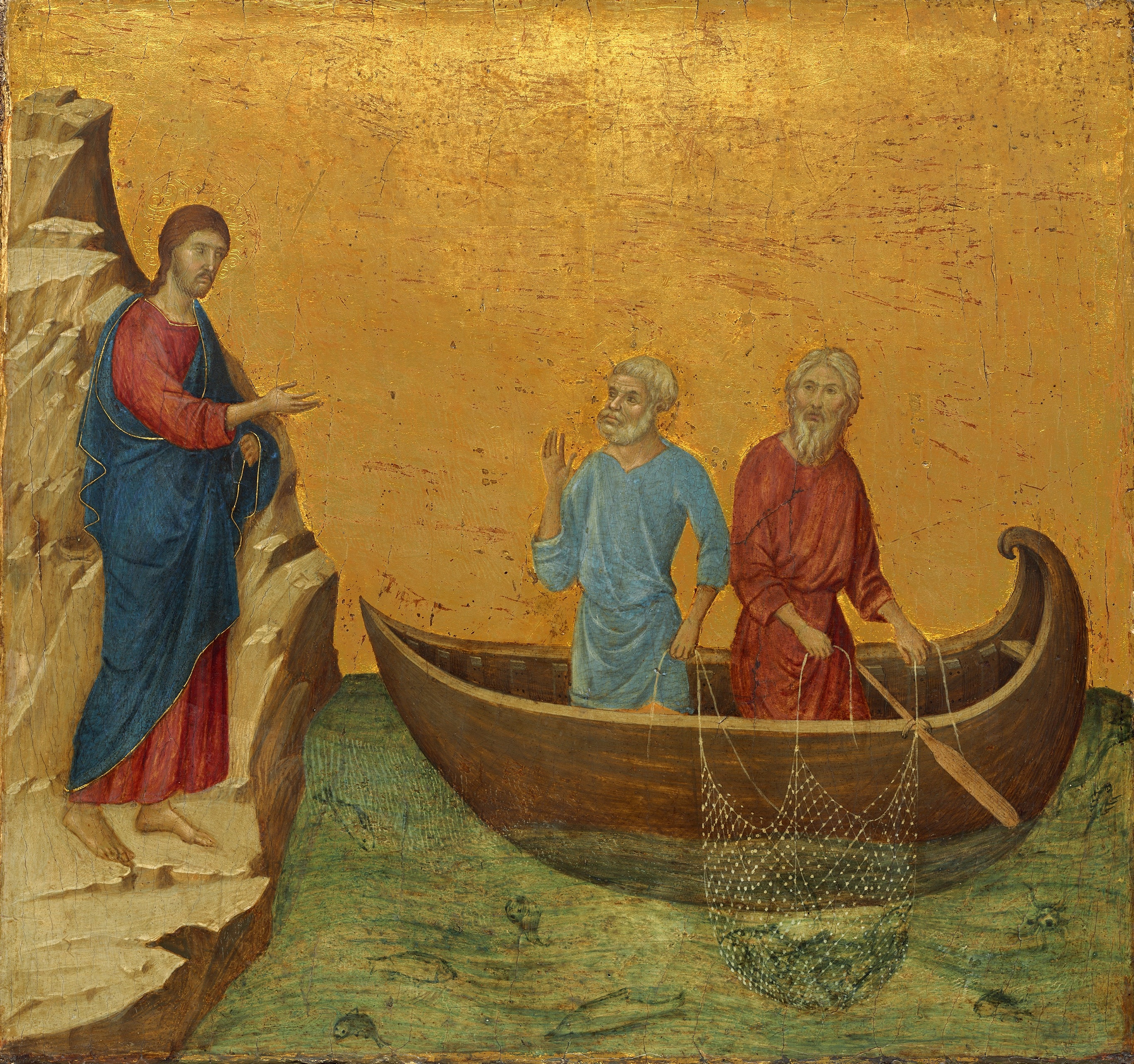
Duccio The Calling of the Apostles Peter and Andrew (from the Maestà) 1308
- c. 1300–05: Giovanni da Rimini paints his Diptych, Scenes from the Lives of the Virgin and other Saints and Scenes from the Life of Christ
- 1300: Duccio paints Stoclet Madonna on a wooden panel
- 1307: Gaddo Gaddi completes the Coronation of the Virgin mosaic over the inside door of Florence Cathedral

== Births ==
- 1308: Orcagna – Italian painter, sculptor, and architect active in Florence (died 1368)
- 1308: Wáng Méng – Chinese painter during the Yuan dynasty (died 1385)
- 1306: Giovanni da Santo Stefano da Ponte – Italian painter of portraits and devotional subjects (died 1365)
- 1302: Fang Congyi – Chinese painter in Yuan Dynasty (died 1393)
- 1301: Stefano Fiorentino – Italian fresco painter (died 1350)
- 1301: Ni Zan – Chinese artist considered to be one of the four "Late Yuan" masters (died 1374)
- 1300: Peter Parler – German architect, best known for building Saint Vitus Cathedral and Charles Bridge in Prague (died 1399)
- 1300: Jean Pucelle – Parisian Gothic-era manuscript illuminator (died 1355)
- 1300: Francesco Talenti – Italian sculptor and architect (died 1369)

== Deaths ==
- 1300/1310: Arnolfo di Cambio – Italian architect and sculptor (born 1240)
- 1302: Cimabue – Italian painter and creator of mosaics from Florence (born 1240)
- 1303: Deodato Cosmati – Roman architect and sculptor, and worker in decorative geometric mosaic (born 1225)
- 1305: Qián Xuǎn – Chinese Song loyalist painter from Zhejiang during the Southern Song (born 1235)
- 1306: Araniko – Nepalese painter and architect (born 1245)
- 1307: Gong Kai – Chinese government official and later scholar-amateur painter (born 1222)
