= 1390s in art =

- 1380s
- 1390s in art
- 1400s
Other topics in 1390s:
- Music

Art timeline

The decade of the 1390s in art involved some significant events.

== Works ==
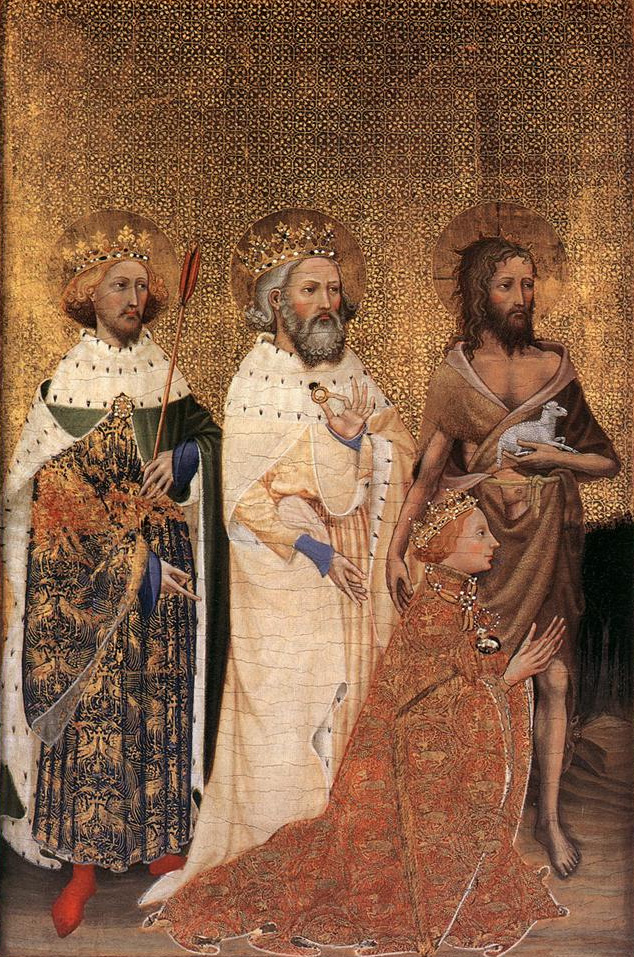
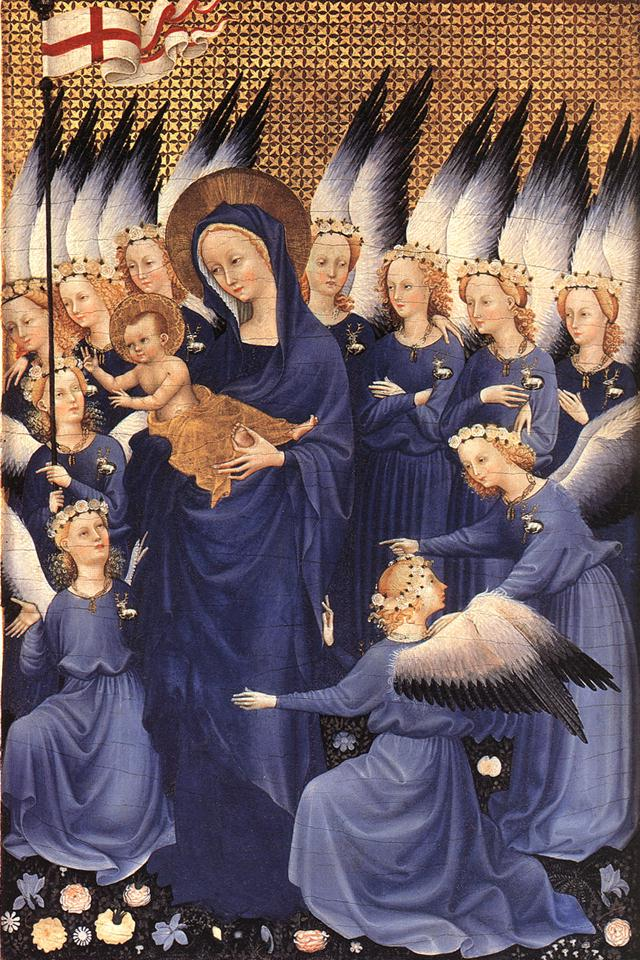
Artist:Unknown, Wilton Diptych (c. 1395–99) tempera on wood, each section 47.5 cm × 29.2 cm. National Gallery, London
- 1391 (probable date): Royal Gold Cup produced in France
- 1394
  - "Oratorio of St. Andrea" – series of paintings from the school of Giotto, San Crispolto church, Bettona
  - Master Bertram of Minden paints a Crucifixion
- c. 1395–1399: "Wilton Diptych" painted by an unknown artist

== Births ==
- 1399/1400: Rogier van der Weyden – one of the greatest of the school of Early Netherlandish painting (died 1464)
- 1399/1403: Giovanni di Paolo – Italian painter and illustrator of manuscripts (died 1482)
- 1398
  - Zhu Zhanji, Xuande Emperor – Emperor of China; also a painter, especially of animals (died 1435)
  - Conrad Witz – German painter, active mainly in Basel, Switzerland (died 1446)
- 1397
  - Borghese di Piero Borghese – Italian painter of the Florentine School and Renaissance art (died 1463)
  - Paolo Uccello – Italian painter notable for his pioneering work on visual perspective in art (died 1475)
  - Nōami – Japanese painter and renga poet in the service of the Ashikaga shogunate (died 1471)
- 1396
  - Jacopo Bellini – a founder of the Renaissance style of painting in Venice and northern Italy (died 1470)
  - Du Qiong – Chinese landscape painter, calligrapher and poet during the Ming dynasty (died 1474)
  - Michelozzo – Italian architect and sculptor (died 1472)
- 1395
  - Fra Angelico – Early Italian Renaissance painter (died 1455)
  - Pisanello – painter of the early Italian Renaissance and Quattrocento (died 1455)
  - Jacques Morel – French sculptor (died 1459)
  - Jan van Eyck – Early Netherlandish painter active in Bruges (died 1441)
- 1393: Piero di Niccolo Lamberti – Italian sculptor (died 1451)
- 1392: Sassetta – Italian painter (died 1450)
- 1390: Gregorio di Cecco – Italian painter of the Sienese School during the early Renaissance (died unknown)

== Deaths ==
- 1399
  - Don Silvestro dei Gherarducci – Italian painter (born 1339)
  - Peter Parler – German architect, best known for building Saint Vitus Cathedral and Charles Bridge in Prague (born 1300)
- 1396: Agnolo Gaddi – Italian painter (died 1350)
- 1393: Fang Congyi – Chinese painter during the Yuan dynasty (born 1302)
- 1392: Hermann von Münster – German master glassmaker (born 1330)
- 1391: Giusto de' Menabuoi – Italian painter of the early Renaissance (born 1320)
- 1390: Altichiero – Italian painter of the Gothic style (born 1330)
