= 1400s in art =

- 1390s
- 1400s in art
- 1410s

Art timeline

The decade of the 15th century in art involved some significant events.

== Events ==
- The 1st century of the Renaissance is completed, but new styles of painting remain strongly linked to the Gothic style, except in the Netherlands and in the Italian city-states.

== Works ==
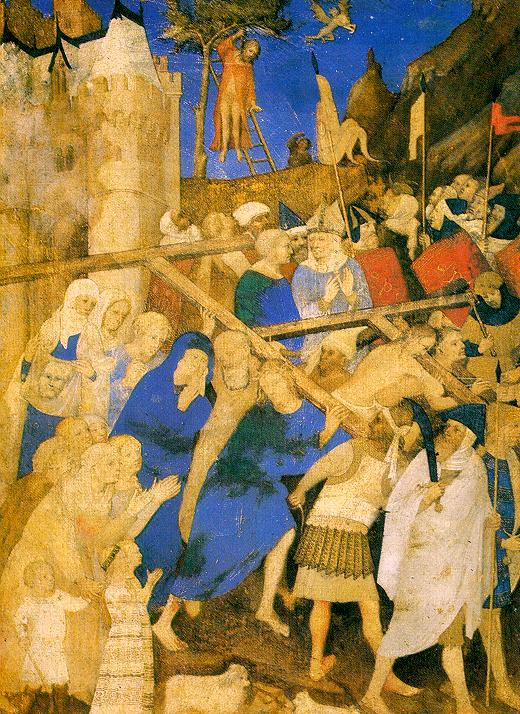
Jacquemart de Hesdin, The Carrying of the Cross, before 1409 (Louvre)

- c.1400: Miniaturist Jacquemart de Hesdin paints The Carrying of the Cross
- 1401: Commission to design bronze doors for the Florence Baptistery won by Lorenzo Ghiberti
- 1405: Andrei Rublev paints icons and frescoes for the Cathedral of the Annunciation, Moscow, the first record of his work
- 1408: Glass painter John Thornton of Coventry completes York Minster's east window in England, the world’s largest expanse of medieval glass
- 1408: Donatello commissioned to sculpt a marble David for Florence Cathedral, his first significant commission

== Births ==
- 1400: Bernardo Martorell – Spanish painter, working in a late gothic style (died 1452)
- 1400: Luca della Robbia – Italian sculptor from Florence, noted for his terracotta roundels (died 1482)
- 1400: Filarete – Florentine Renaissance architect, sculptor and architectural theorist (died 1469)
- 1401: Masaccio – painter of the Quattrocento period of the Italian Renaissance (died 1428)
- 1402: Simone di Nanni Ferrucci – Italian sculptor of the Ferrucci family of artists (died unknown)
- 1402: Marco del Buono – Italian painter and woodworker (died 1489)
- 1403: Dello di Niccolò Delli – Italian sculptor and painter from Florence (died 1470)
- 1404: Jacques Daret – Early Netherlandish painter (died 1470)
- 1404: Leone Battista Alberti – Italian author whose treatises on painting and architecture are hailed as the founding texts of a new form of art (died 1472)
- 1405: Stefano d'Antonio di Vanni – Italian Renaissance painter (died 1483)
- 1406: Filippo Lippi – Italian painter of the Italian Quattrocento (15th century) school (died 1469)
- 1406: Sano di Pietro – early Italian Renaissance painter from Siena (died 1481)
- 1409: Liu Jue – Chinese landscape painter, calligrapher, and poet during the Ming dynasty (died 1472)
- 1400–1410: Konrad Witz – German painter, especially of altarpieces (died 1445/1446)

== Deaths ==
- 1400: André Beauneveu – Early Netherlandish sculptor and painter (born 1335)
- 1403: Niccolò da Bologna – Italian manuscript illuminator (born 1325)
- 1405: 'Abd al-Hayy – Persian illustrator and painter (born 1374)
- 1405/1406: Claus Sluter – Dutch sculptor (born 1340)
