= 1330s in art =

- 1320s
- 1330s in art
- 1340s
Other topics in 1330s:
- Music

Art timeline

The decade of the 1330s in art involved some significant events.

== Events ==
- 1338–1340: Ambrogio Lorenzetti paints The Allegory of Good and Bad Government frescoes in Palazzo Pubblico, Siena, Tuscany
- 1339: Italian painter and architect Taddeo Gaddi suffers a serious eye injury while studying solar eclipses

== Works ==
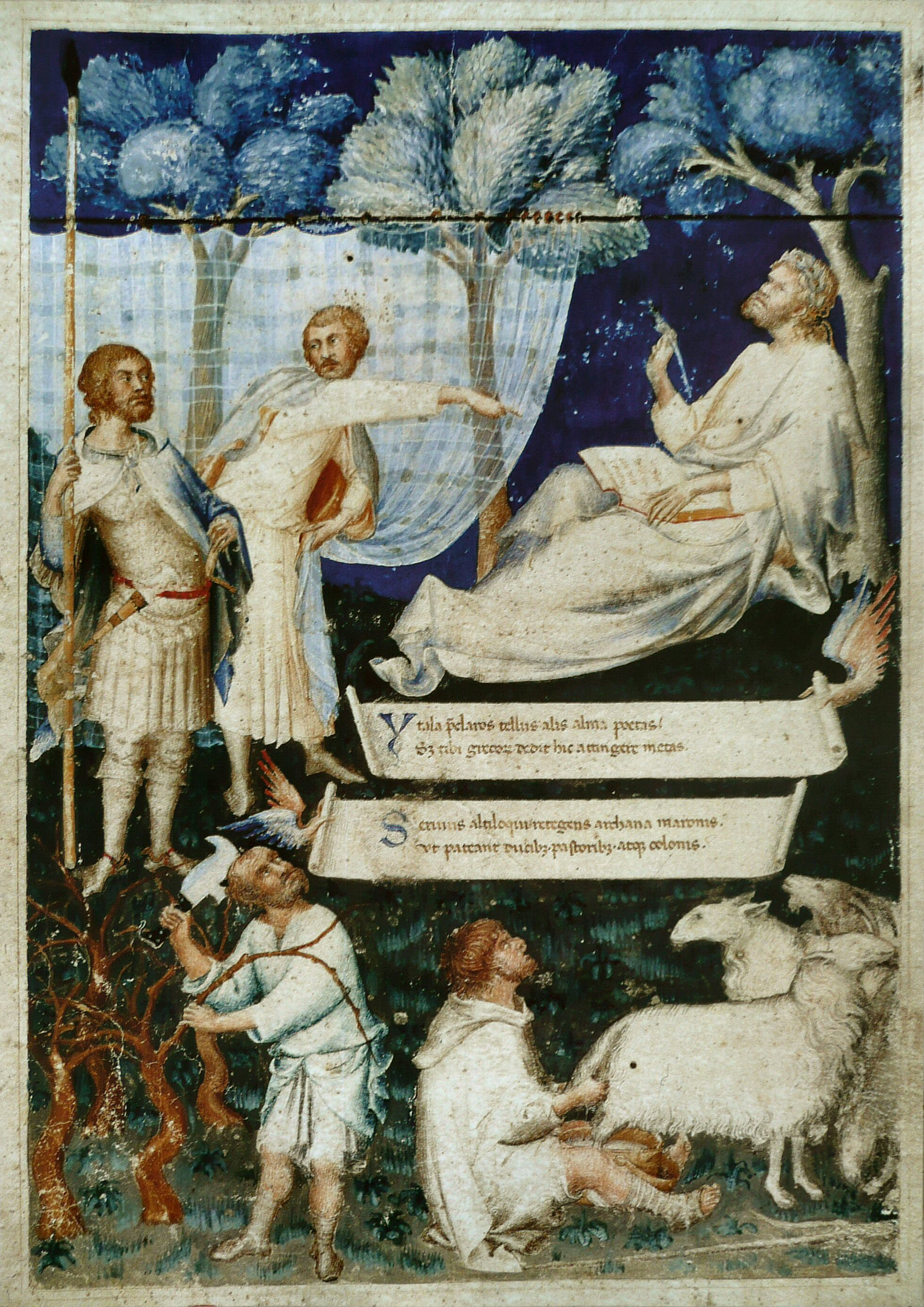
Petrarch's Virgil (title page) (c. 1336)
Illuminated manuscript, 29,5 x 20 cm – Simone Martini
Biblioteca Ambrosiana, Milan.

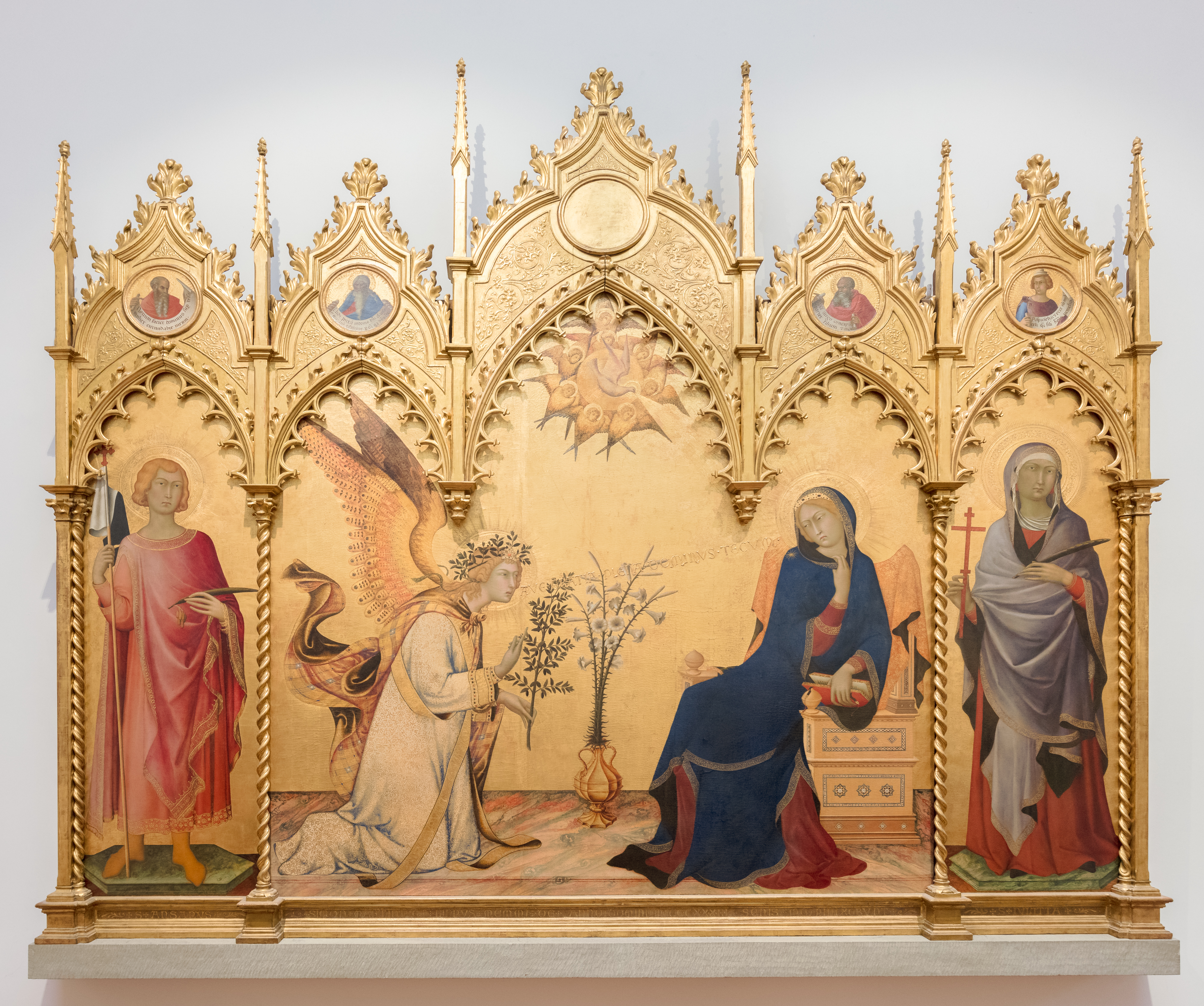
The Annunciation with St. Margaret and St. Asano, Simone Martini, 1333

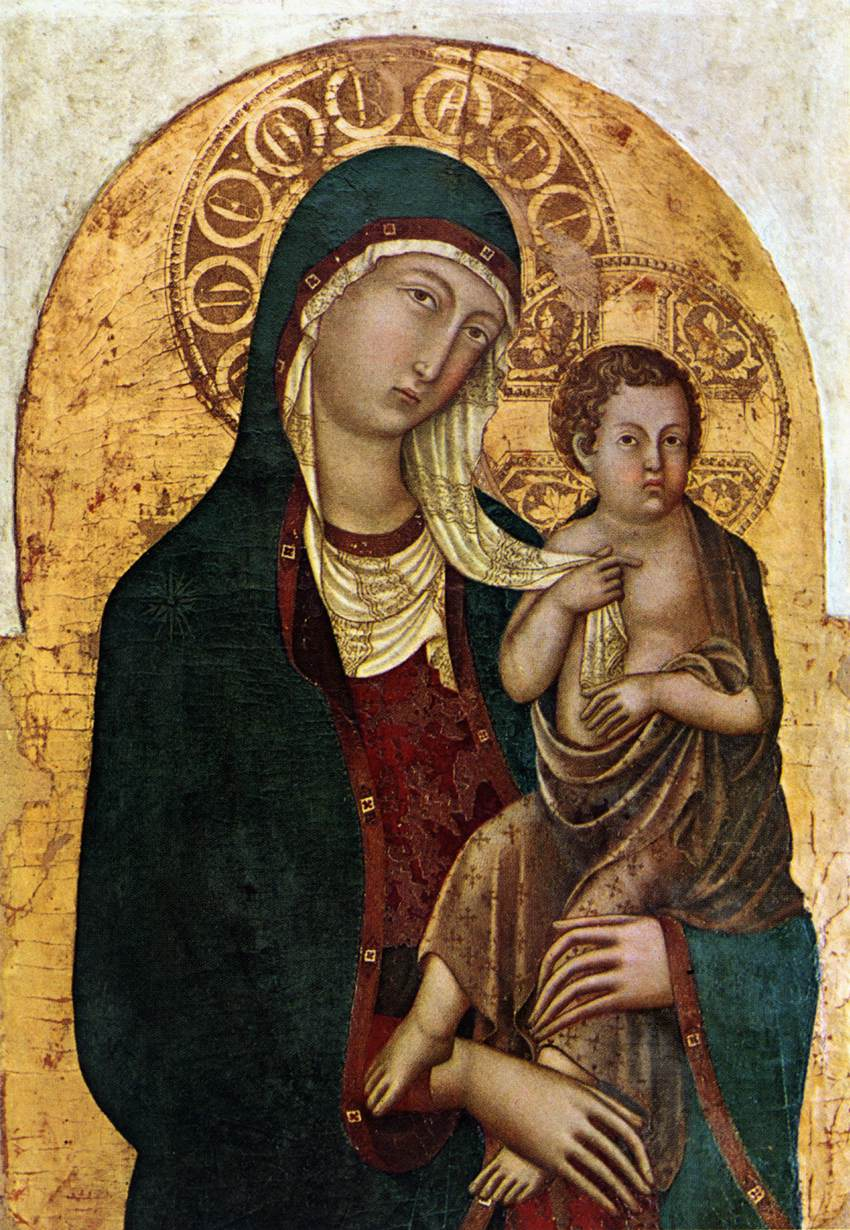
Madonna with Child, Niccolò di Segna, c.1336

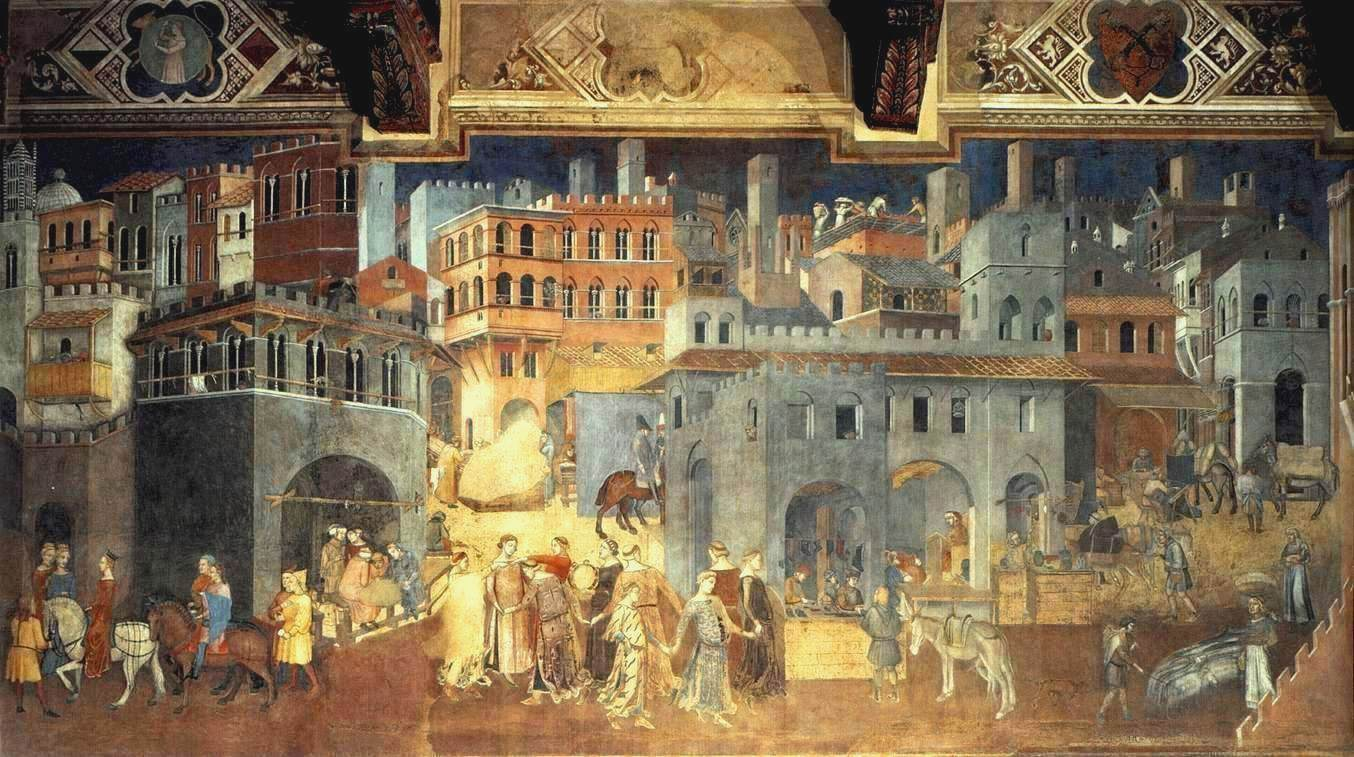
The Effects of Good Government, Ambrogio Lorenzetti, 1338

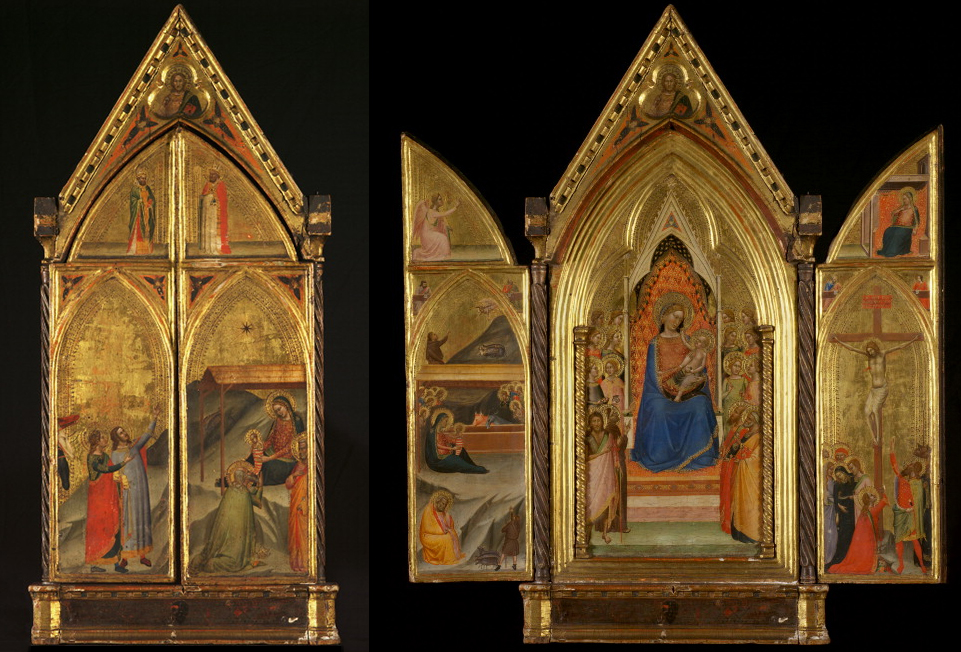
The Virgin and Child Enthroned with Saints, triptych, Bernardo Daddi, 1338

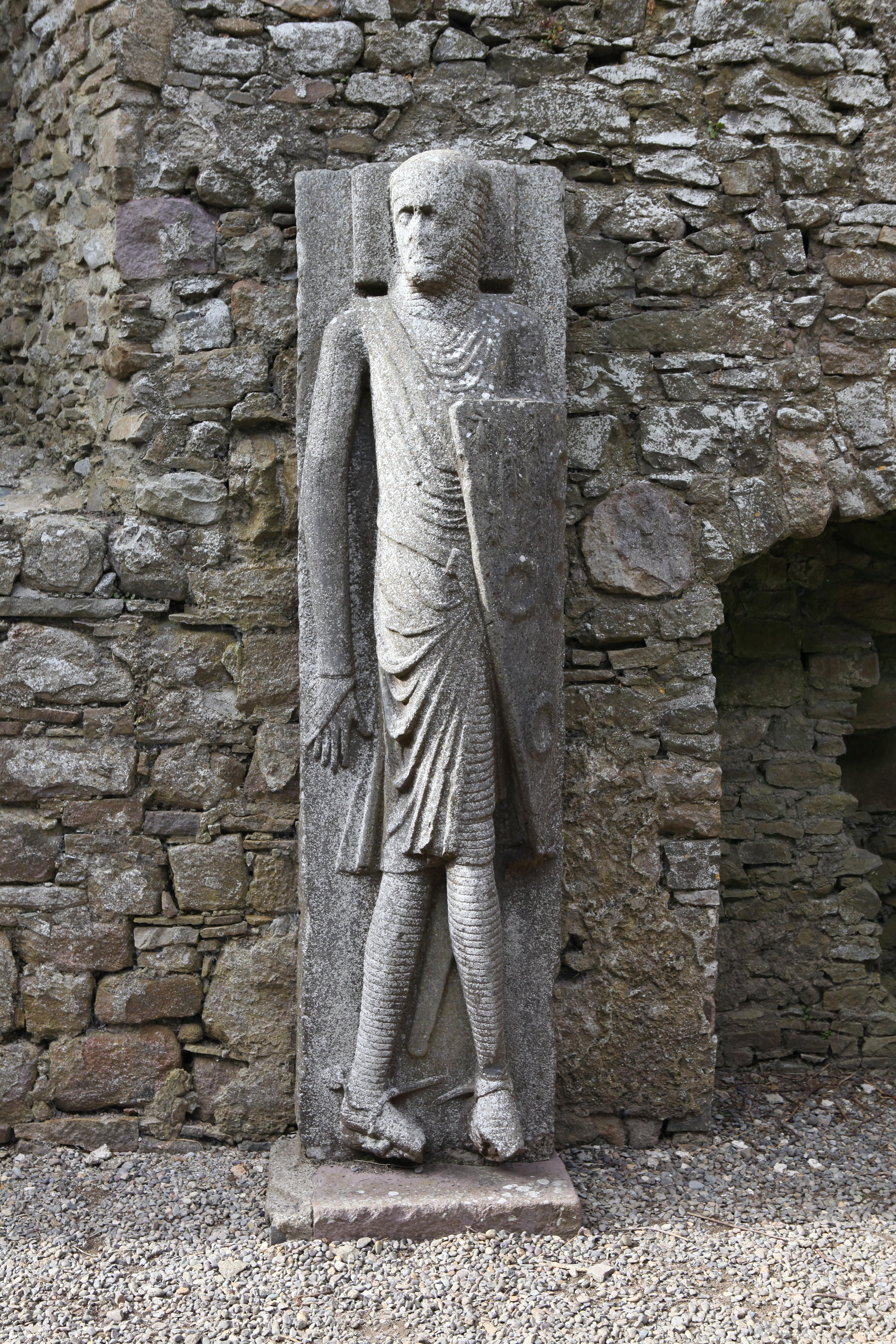
Cantwell Fada, limestone effigy, Ireland c. 1330
- 1330: Giovanni di Agostino sculpts a monument to Bishop Guido Tarlati

== Births ==
- 1339: Don Silvestro dei Gherarducci – Italian painter (died 1399)
- 1335: André Beauneveu – Early Netherlandish sculptor and painter (died 1400)
- 1332: Wang Lü – Chinese landscape painter, calligrapher, and poet during the Ming dynasty (died unknown)
- 1332: Andrea Vanni – Italian painter active mainly in his native Siena (died 1414)
- 1330: Jacopo del Casentino – Italian painter active mainly in Tuscany (died 1380)
- 1330: Bartolo di Fredi – Italian painter, a member of the Sienese School (died 1410)
- 1330: Vitale da Bologna – Italian painter (died 1361)
- 1330: Altichiero – Italian painter in the Gothic style (died 1390)
- 1330: Hermann von Münster – German master glassmaker (died 1392)
- 1330: Wang Yi – Chinese painter of human figures during the Yuan dynasty (died unknown)
- 1330: Luca di Tommè – Italian tempera painter (died 1389)
- c.1330: Jean de Liège – French sculptor (died 1381)

== Deaths ==
- 1339: Giovanni di Balduccio – Italian sculptor (born 1290)
- 1337: Giotto di Bondone – Italian painter and architect from Florence (born 1267)
- 1337: Tino di Camaino – Italian sculptor (born 1280)
- 1330: Pietro Cavallini – Italian painter and mosaic designer (born 1259)
- 1330: Lorenzo Maitani – Italian architect and sculptor primarily responsible for the construction and decoration of the façade of Orvieto Cathedral (born 1255)
