= 1370s in art =

- 1360s
- 1370s in art
- 1380s
Other topics in 1370s:
- Music

Art timeline

The decade of the 1370s in art involved some significant events.

== Events ==
- 1370: September 19 – Hundred Years' War: Siege of Limoges – The English retake the city from the French by storm with wide destruction, effectively ending the Limoges enamel industry
- 1378: Catherine of Siena – Dialogue of Divine Providence

== Paintings ==
1372: Ni Zan paints his Rongxi Studio

== Births ==
- 1378: Lorenzo Ghiberti – Italian artist of the early Renaissance best known for works in sculpture and metalworking (died 1455)
- 1376: Rossello di Jacopo Franchi – Italian painter (died 1457)
- 1375: Robert Campin – considered the first great master of Early Netherlandish painting (died 1444)
- 1375: Ottaviano Nelli – Italian quattrocento painter (died 1444)
- 1374: Jacopo della Quercia – Italian sculptor of the Italian Renaissance (died 1438)
- 1374: 'Abd al-Hayy – Persian illustrator and painter (died 1405)
- 1373: Bicci di Lorenzo – Italian painter and sculptor, active in Florence (died 1452)
- 1370: Guo Chun – imperial Chinese painter in the early Ming Dynasty (died 1444)
- 1370: Lorenzo Monaco – Florentine painter (died 1425)
- 1370: Cennino Cennini – Italian painter influenced by Giotto (died 1440)
- 1370: Gentile da Fabriano – Italian painter known for his participation in the International Gothic style (died 1427)
- 1370: Xie Huan – Chinese painter of the early Ming Dynasty (died 1450)
- 1370: Conrad von Soest – German Gothic painter (died 1422)
- 1370: Jacobello del Fiore – Italian quattrocento painter (died 1439)

== Deaths ==
- 1374: Ni Zan – Chinese artist considered to be one of the four "Late Yuan" masters (born 1301)
- 1373: Allegretto Nuzi – Italian painter (born 1315)
- 1370: Yang Weizhen – Chinese painter and calligrapher (born 1296)
- 1370: Giovanni di Agostino – Italian painter (born 1310)
- 1370: Gennaro di Cola – Italian Trecento painter active mainly in Naples (born 1320)
