= 1360s in art =

- 1350s
- 1360s in art
- 1370s
Other topics in 1360s:
- Music

Art timeline

The decade of the 1360s in art involved some significant events.

== Paintings ==
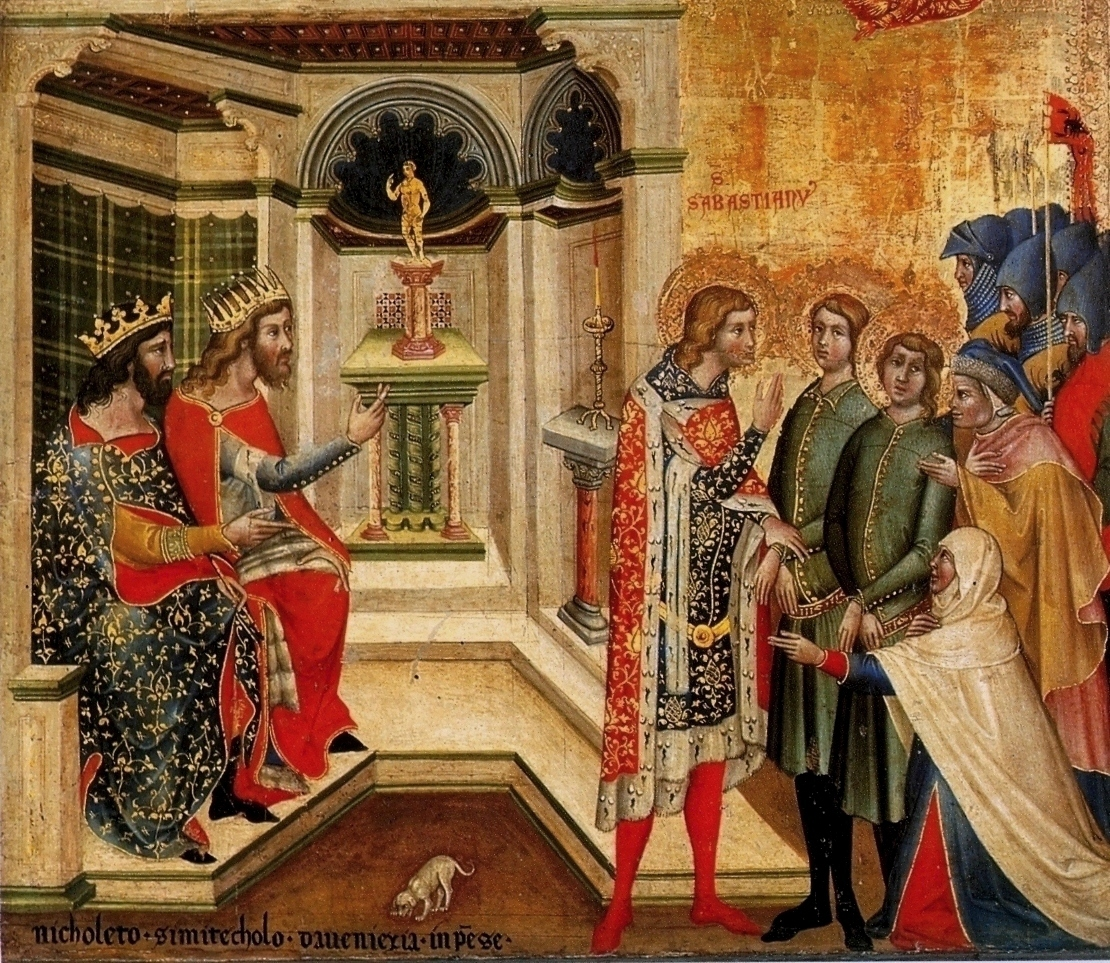
Niccolò Semitecolo, Two Christians before the Judges, Padua Cathedral, 1367

- 1365: Theodoric of Prague – St. Jerome and St. Gregory
- 1367: Niccolò Semitecolo – Two Christians before the Judges
- c. 1368 – Koran frontispiece (right half of two-page spread), from Cairo, Egypt, is made. It was donated 1369 by Sultan Al-Ashraf Sha'ban to the madrasa established by his mother. It is now kept at National Library, Cairo.

== Births ==
- 1369: Xie Jin – Chinese painter and calligrapher (died 1415)
- 1366 or 1369: Bartolomeo di Fruosino – Italian painter and illuminator of the Florentine School (died 1441)
- 1366: Hubert van Eyck – Flemish painter and older brother of Jan van Eyck (died 1426)
- 1365: Jean Malouel – Netherlandish artist, court painter of Philip the Bold (died 1415)
- 1362: Taddeo di Bartolo – Italian painter of the Sienese School during the early Renaissance (died 1422)
- 1362: Wang Fu – Chinese landscape painter, calligrapher, and poet during the Ming Dynasty (died 1416)
- 1360/1370: Andrei Rublev – the greatest medieval Russian iconographer (painter of Orthodox icons and frescoes) (died 1430)
- 1360/1370: Andrea di Bartolo – Italian painter of the Sienese School (died 1428)
- 1360/1370: Madern Gerthener – German late Gothic stonemason, sculptor, and architect (died 1430)
- 1360: Daniel Chorny – Russian iconographer (died 1430)
- 1360: Filippo Scannabecchi – Italian painter of primarily religious themed works (died 1410)

== Deaths ==
- 1369: Francesco Talenti – Italian sculptor and architect (born 1300)
- 1369: Giottino – Italian painter from Florence (born 1324)
- 1368: Matteo Giovanetti – Italian religious-themed fresco painter (born 1322)
- 1368: Orcagna – Italian painter, sculptor, and architect active in Florence (born 1308)
- 1368: Tang Di – Chinese landscape painter during the Yuan Dynasty (born 1287)
- 1366: Taddeo Gaddi – Italian painter and architect, active during the early Renaissance (born 1290)
- 1365: Giovanni da Santo Stefano da Ponte – Italian painter of portraits and devotional subjects (born 1306)
- 1365: Gu An – Chinese painter in Yuan Dynasty (born 1289)
- 1365: Zhu Derun – Chinese painter and poet in Yuan Dynasty (born 1294)
- 1362: Giovanni Baronzio – Italian religious painter (born unknown)
- 1361: Vitale da Bologna – Italian painter, of the Early Renaissance (born c. 1309)
- c. 1360: Zhao Yong – Chinese painter in Yuan Dynasty (born 1289)
