= Matteo da Siena =

Matteo da Siena may refer to:

- Matteo di Giovanni — Italian Renaissance artist from the Sienese School.
- Matteino da Siena — Italian painter of landscapes and buildings.
