= Pietro Vannini =

Pietro Vannini (1413/1414–1495/1496) was an Italian artist and silversmith.

Vannini was highly skilled in metalwork. A Processional Cross he created in 1455 was made by taking sheets of silver that he hammered, chased, and gilded to create a design, then attaching them to a wooden core. Some of his other works reside at the Municipal Art Gallery of Ascoli Piceno. He died in Marche.
