= Christ the Redeemer (icon) =

Russian orthodox icon

Christ the Redeemer is a Russian icon discovered by accident in a dilapidated woodshed near Zvenigorod in 1919. With several other icons stored nearby, it was attributed as the work of Andrei Rublev, painted for one of Zvenigorod cathedrals in the 1420s. It is exhibited in the Tretyakov Gallery of Moscow.

After the intense wear over the years, it went over a restoration in 1956, after the de-Stalinization of the Soviet Union.
