= 1440s in art =

- 1430s
- 1440s in art
- 1450s

Art timeline

The decade of the 1440s in art involved some significant events.

== Events ==
- 1440: Donatello completes his series of sculptures for Prato Cathedral.
- 1440: Pisanello moves to Milan.
- 1440: Luca della Robbia invents new techniques in terra cotta sculpting at about this date.
- 1440: Rogier van der Weyden begins his travels through the Italian city-states.
- 1445: Fra Angelico is summoned by the Pope to paint frescoes in the Chapel of the Holy Sacrament (destroyed) in St. Peter's Basilica.
- 1445: Piero della Francesca is commissioned by the Compagnia della Misericordia in Sansepolcro to paint the Madonna della Misericordia.
- 1448: Giovanni d'Alemagna the elder, Antonio Vivarini, Niccolò Pizzolo and Andrea Mantegna are commissioned to decorate the Ovetari Chapel of the Church of the Eremitani in Padua.

== Paintings ==
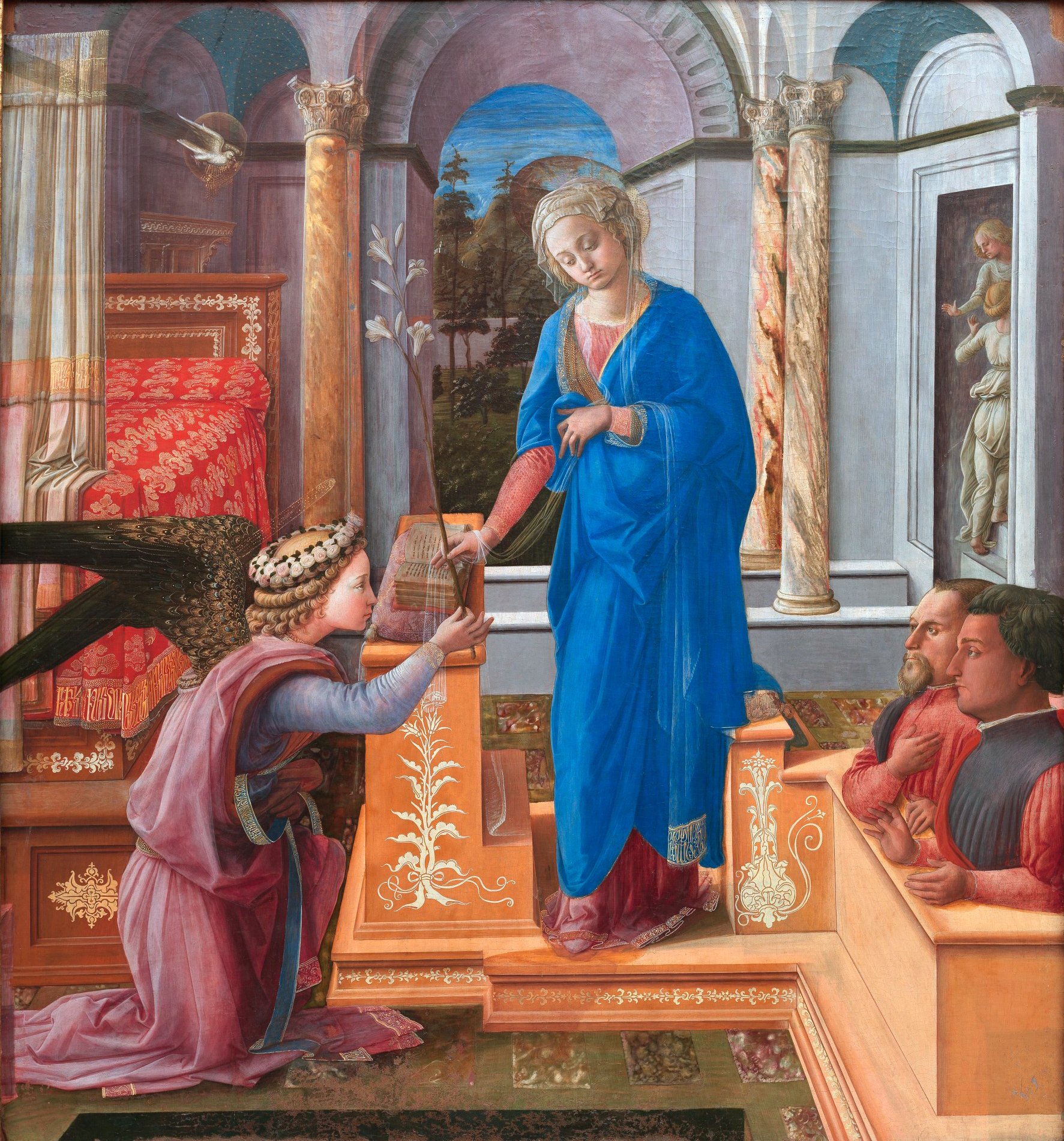
Filippo Lippi – Annunciation with two Kneeling Donors

- Anonymous – The Triumph of Death (c.1446) (Palazzo Abatellis, Palermo)
- Fra Angelico – Frescoes in San Marco, Florence, notably the Crucifixion in the Capitular Hall (completed 1442), and the San Marco Altarpiece (completed c.1443)
- Fra Angelico and assistants – Frescoes in Niccoline Chapel of the Apostolic Palace in the Vatican City (1447-1451)
- Hans Bornemann – Heiligentaler Altar (Altarpiece of St. Nicholas) (after 1444)
- Dieric Bouts – Infancy Triptych (c.1445) (Museo del Prado)
- Petrus Christus
  - Lamentation (Pietà) (c.1444)
  - Portrait of a Carthusian (1446)
- Niccolò Antonio Colantonio – Delivery of the Franciscan Rule (c.1445)
- Lluís Dalmau
  - Virgin and Child (1445)
  - Virgin of the Consellers (1443-1445)
- Andrea del Castagno – Frescoes
  - Death of the Virgin (1442–1443) (St Mark's Basilica, Venice)
  - San Tarasio Chapel, San Zaccaria, Venice (1442)
  - The Last Supper (1445-1450) and others (Sant'Apollonia, Florence)
- Piero della Francesca
  - The Baptism of Christ (completed c.1448-1450)
  - Frescoes in Castello Estense and church of Sant'Andrea, Ferrara (1449; now lost)
- Barthélemy d'Eyck (attributed) – Aix Annunciation (1443-1445)
- Giovanni di Paolo
  - Guelfi Altarpiece (1445)
  - Illuminations of Dante's Paradiso (c.1444-1450)
- Jean Fouquet – Portrait of Pope Eugene IV (before 1447)
- Jost Haller − Tempelhof Altarpiece (ca. 1445)
- Filippo Lippi
  - Annunciation (completed c.1443-1450) (Alte Pinakothek, Munich)
  - Annunciation (completed c.1445-1450) (Doria Pamphilj Gallery, Rome)
  - The Annunciation with two Kneeling Donors (1440-1445)
  - Coronation of the Virgin (1441-1447)
  - Marsuppini Coronation (after 1444)
  - Martelli Annunciation (c.1440)
- Andrea Mantegna – Saint Jerome in the Wilderness (c.1448–1451) (São Paulo Museum of Art)
- Pisanello
  - Portrait of a Princess of the House of Este (c.1435-1449)
  - Cecilia Gonzaga commemorative medal (1447)
- Stefano di Giovanni (Sassetta) – The Meeting of St. Anthony and St. Paul (c.1440)
- Tenshō Shūbun – Reading in a Bamboo Grove
- Paolo Uccello
  - The Battle of San Romano (triptych, c.1435-1455)
  - Green Stations of the Cross frescoes in Chiostro Verde (green cloisters) of Basilica of Santa Maria Novella, Florence (1446-1447)
  - Nativity and Resurrection stained glass windows (1443-1444) and Four Evangelists clock face in Florence Cathedral
- Rogier van der Weyden
  - The Descent from the Cross (c.1435)
  - The Exhumation of Saint Hubert (c.1437-1440)
  - Beaune Altarpiece (c.1445-1450)
  - Miraflores Altarpiece (c.1442-1445)
  - Portrait of Isabella of Portugal (c.1445-1450)
  - Saint Luke Drawing the Virgin ("Self-portrait as Saint Luke") (c.1435-1440) (Museum of Fine Arts, Boston)
  - Seven Sacraments Altarpiece (1445-1450)
  - Frontispiece of the Chroniques de Hainaut (1447)
- Jan van Eyck
  - Annunciation (c.1440)
  - Portrait of Christ ("Vera Icon") (c.1440) (Groeningemuseum)
  - Saint Jerome in His Study (1442)
- Domenico Veneziano
  - The Carnesecchi Tabernacle (c.1440-1444) (surviving fragments in National Gallery, London)
  - Santa Lucia de' Magnoli Altarpiece (c.1445-1447)
- Konrad Witz
  - Altarpiece of the Virgin (c.1440)
  - Saint Madeleine and Saint Catherine (c. 1440)
  - The Miraculous Draft of Fishes (1444)

== Births ==
- 1440: Jacopo de' Barbari – Italian painter and printmaker (died 1516)
- 1440: Agnolo degli Erri - Italian Gothic painter of the Italian Renaissance (died 1482)
- 1440: Antonio Vivarini – Italian painter of the Vivarini family of painters (died 1480)
- 1440: Adriano Fiorentino - Italian medallist and sculptor (died 1499)
- 1440: Giovanni Dalmata – Dalmatian sculptor (died 1514)
- 1440: Andrea di Niccolò - Italian painter of the Sienese School (died 1514)
- 1440: Dionisius – head of the Moscow school of icon painters (died 1502)
- 1440: Rueland Frueauf the Elder - Austrian Late-Gothic painter (died 1507)
- 1440: Cristoforo de Predis – Italian miniaturist and illuminator (died 1486)
- 1440: Fiorenzo di Lorenzo – Italian painter of the Umbrian school (died 1522)
- 1440: Ludwig Schongauer – German painter (d. ca.1494)
- 1440: Hugo van der Goes – Flemish painter (died 1482)
- 1440: Bartolomé Bermejo – Spanish painter who adopted Dutch painting techniques (died 1498)
- 1440: Fra Girolamo Bonsignori – Italian monk and painter (died 1519)
- 1440: Vittorio Crivelli – Italian painter (died 1501/1502)
- 1440: Fernando Gallego – Spanish painter brought up in an age of gothic style (died 1507)
- 1440: Rodrigo de Osona - Spanish Renaissance painter (died 1518)
- (born 1440–1445): Colijn de Coter – early Netherlandish painter who produced mainly altarpieces (died 1522-1532)
- c.1440s: Master I. A. M. of Zwolle, anonymous Dutch goldsmith and engraver (died 1504)
- c.1440s: Gil de Siloé, Spanish Gothic sculptor of Flemish origin (died 1501)
- 1441: Liberale da Verona – Italian painter of the Renaissance period active mainly in Verona (died 1526)
- 1441: Ali-Shir Nava'i – Central Asian politician, mystic, linguist, painter, and poet (died 1501)
- 1442: Benedetto da Maiano – sculptor (died 1497)
- 1442: Jacopo da Sellaio – Italian painter from the Florentine School (died 1493)
- 1442: Domenico Morone – Italian painter from Verona (died 1518)
- 1443: Giuliano da Sangallo - Italian sculptor and architect (died 1518)
- 1443: Piero del Pollaiuolo – painter (died 1496)
- 1443: Baldassare Estense – Italian painter and medalist (died unknown)
- 1443: Giovanni di Stefano, Italian bronze-caster, engineer, and sculptor (died 1506)
- 1445: Gian Giacomo Dolcebuono - Italian architect and sculptor (died 1504)
- 1445: Francesco Rosselli – Italian miniature painter, engraver of maps and old master prints (died 1513)
- 1445: Sandro Botticelli – Italian painter of the Florentine school during the Early Renaissance (Quattrocento) (died 1510)
- 1445: Ambrogio Foppa – Italian goldsmith, sculptor, and die sinker (died 1527)
- 1445: Guido Mazzoni – Italian sculptor and painter (died 1518)
- 1445: Luca Signorelli – Italian Renaissance painter, draughtsman, especially in his use of foreshortening (died 1523)
- 1445: Israhel van Meckenem – German printmaker and goldsmith (died 1503)
- 1445/1450: Veit Stoss – Engraver, painter, and sculptor of the late Gothic sculpture in Germany (died 1533)
- 1446: Antonio del Rincón – Spanish painter and artist (died 1500)
- 1446: Biagio d'Antonio - Italian painter (died 1516)
- 1446: Alvise Vivarini – Italian painter (died 1502)
- 1446/1450: Pietro Perugino – Italian painter of the Umbrian school during the High Renaissance (died 1523)
- 1447: Neroccio di Bartolomeo de' Landi – Italian painter and sculptor (died 1500)
- 1447: Bartolomeo degli Erri - Italian Gothic painter of the Italian Renaissance (died 1482)
- 1447: Giovanni Antonio Amadeo – Italian early Renaissance sculptor[1], architect and engineer (died 1522)
- 1448: Martin Schongauer – German engraver and painter (died 1491)
- 1448: Dieric Bouts the Younger - Belgian painter of the Early Netherlandish painting era (died 1491)
- 1449: Lazzaro Bastiani – Italian painter of the Renaissance, active mainly in Venice (died 1512)
- 1449: Domenico Ghirlandaio – painter (died 1494)
- 1449: Domenico Gagini – Italian sculptor (died 1492)

== Deaths ==
- 1440: Cennino D'Andrea Cennini – Florentine painter (born 1370)
- 1441: Bartolomeo di Fruosino - Italian painter and illuminator of the Florentine School (born 1366 or 1369)
- 1441: Jan van Eyck – Early Netherlandish painter (born 1385)
- 1444: Robert Campin – Early Netherlandish painter (born 1375)
- 1444: Guo Chun – imperial Chinese painter in the early Ming Dynasty (born 1370)
- 1444: Ottaviano Nelli - Italian quattrocento painter (born 1375)
- 1445: Henri Bellechose – painter from the South Netherlands (b. unknown)
- 1445: Michelino Molinari da Besozzo – Italian painter (born 1385)
- 1445/1446: Konrad Witz – German painter, especially of altarpieces (born 1400-1410)
- 1446/1447: Mir Ali Tabrizi – Persian calligrapher and inventor of the Nastaʿlīq script (born unknown)
- 1447: Masolino da Panicale – Italian painter (born 1383)
