= 1310s in art =

- 1300s
- 1310s in art
- 1320s
Other topics in 1310s:
- Music

The decade of the 1310s in art involved some significant events.

== Events ==
- 1311: June 9 – Duccio's Maestà altarpiece, a seminal artwork of the early Italian Renaissance, is unveiled in Siena Cathedral in Italy.
- 1315: February 12 – Italian sculptor Tino di Camaino is commissioned by the Republic of Pisa to create the statue of the late Henry VII, Holy Roman Emperor (Enrico VII di Lussemburgo, King of Italy), to be finished in less than six months for the August 24 dedication of Henry's tomb. Camaino delivers the work by July 26.

== Works ==
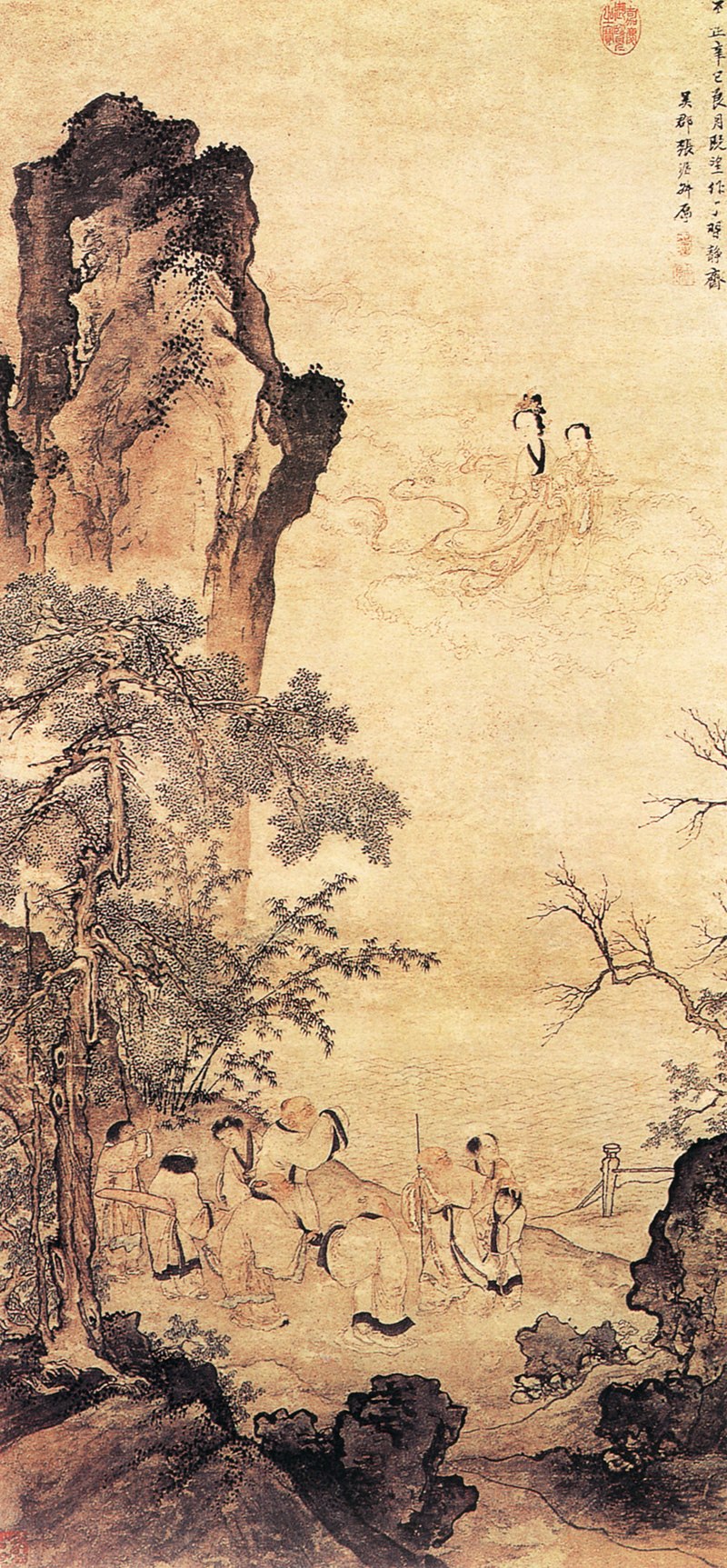
Zhang Wo, Celebration in Jade Pool, 1314

- 1313: Giovanni Pisano – monument in memory of Margaret of Brabant
- 1314: Zhang Wo – Celebration in Jade Pool
- 1319: Ambrogio Lorenzetti – Madonna and Child

== Births ==
- 1310: Giovanni di Agostino – Italian painter (died 1370)
- 1315: Allegretto Nuzi – Italian painter (died 1373)

== Deaths ==
- 1319: Guan Daosheng – Chinese woman painter during the Yuan Dynasty (born 1262)
- 1319: Duccio – – influential Italian artists of his time (born 1255)
- 1317: Yishan Yining – Chinese Buddhist monk calligrapher, writer, and teacher (born 1247)
- 1315: Giovanni Pisano – Italian sculptor, painter and architect (born 1255)
- 1313: Guglielmo Agnelli – Italian sculptor and architect, born in Pisa (born 1238)
- 1312: Gaddo Gaddi – Italian painter and mosaicist of Florence in a gothic art style (born 1239)
- 1310: Gao Kegong – Chinese painter born during the Yuan dynasty (born 1248)
- 1300/1310: Arnolfo di Cambio – Italian architect and sculptor (born 1240)
