= 1420s in art =

- 1410s
- 1420s in art
- 1430s

Art timeline

The decade of the 1420s in art involved some significant events.

== Events ==
- 1420s: First use of graphical perspective in painting.
- February 19, 1426: Masaccio is commissioned to paint a major altarpiece, the Pisa Polyptych altarpiece in the church of Santa Maria del Carmine in Pisa.
- c. 1426 – Bahram Gur and the Indian Princess in Her Black Pavilion, a copy of the 12th century "Haft Paykar" (Seven Beauties) of Nizami Ganjavi, Herat, Afghanistan, is made. Timurid dynasty period. It is now kept at The Metropolitan Museum of Art, New York.
- Devonshire Hunting Tapestries woven.

== Works ==
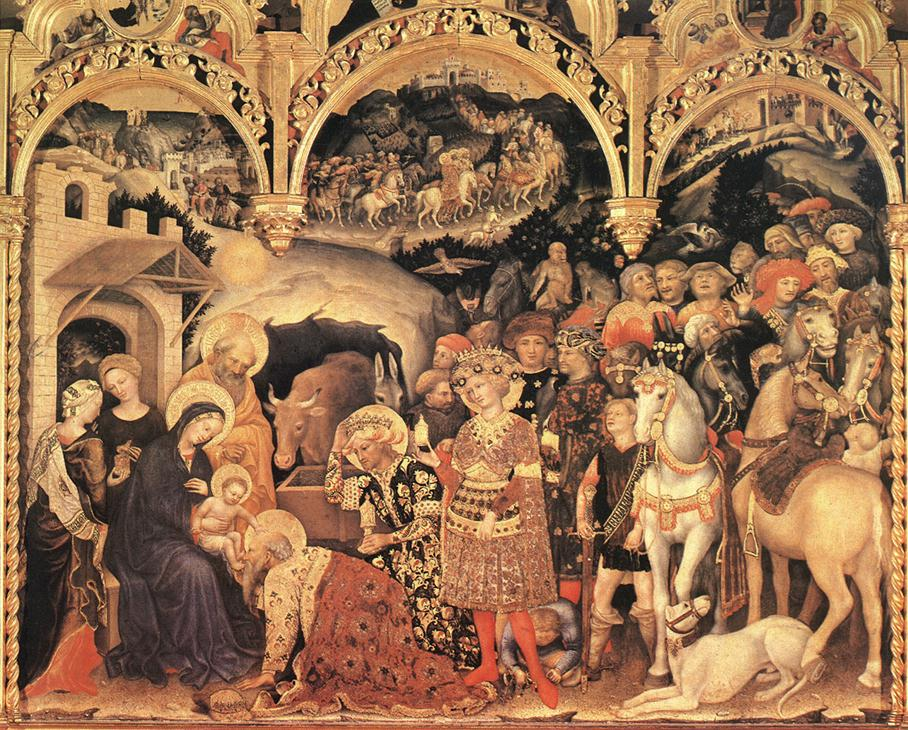
1423: Gentile, Adoration of the Magi

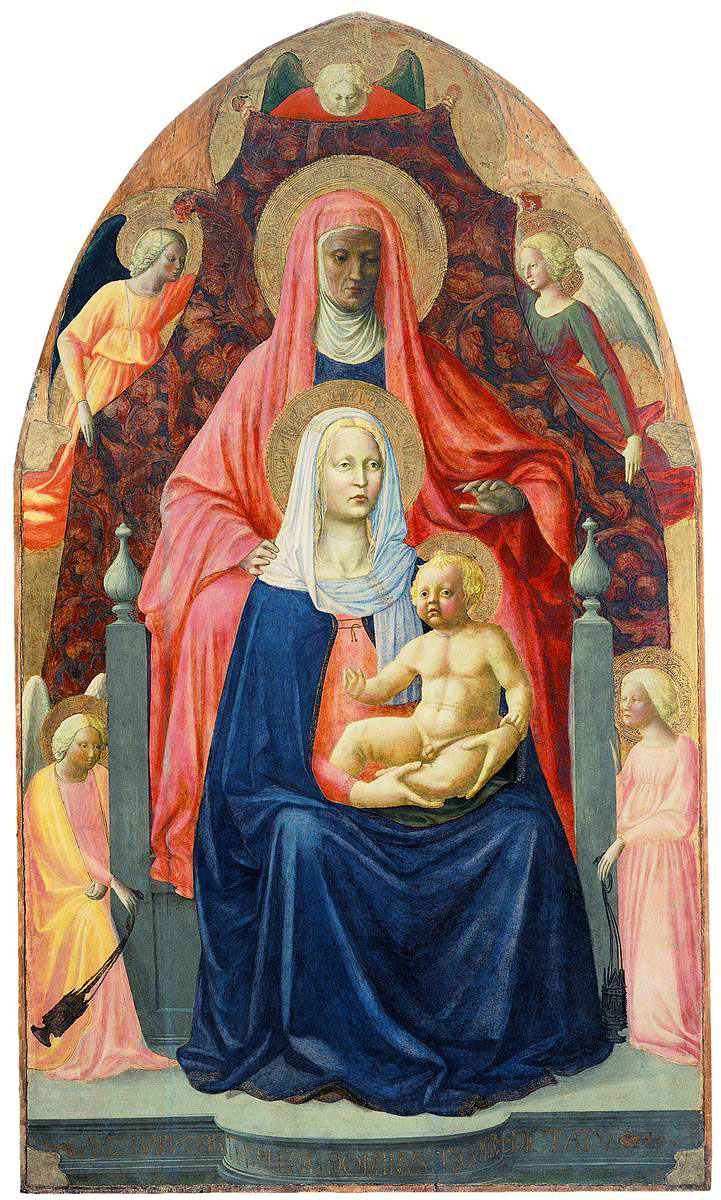
1424: Masaccio, Virgin and Child with St. Anne

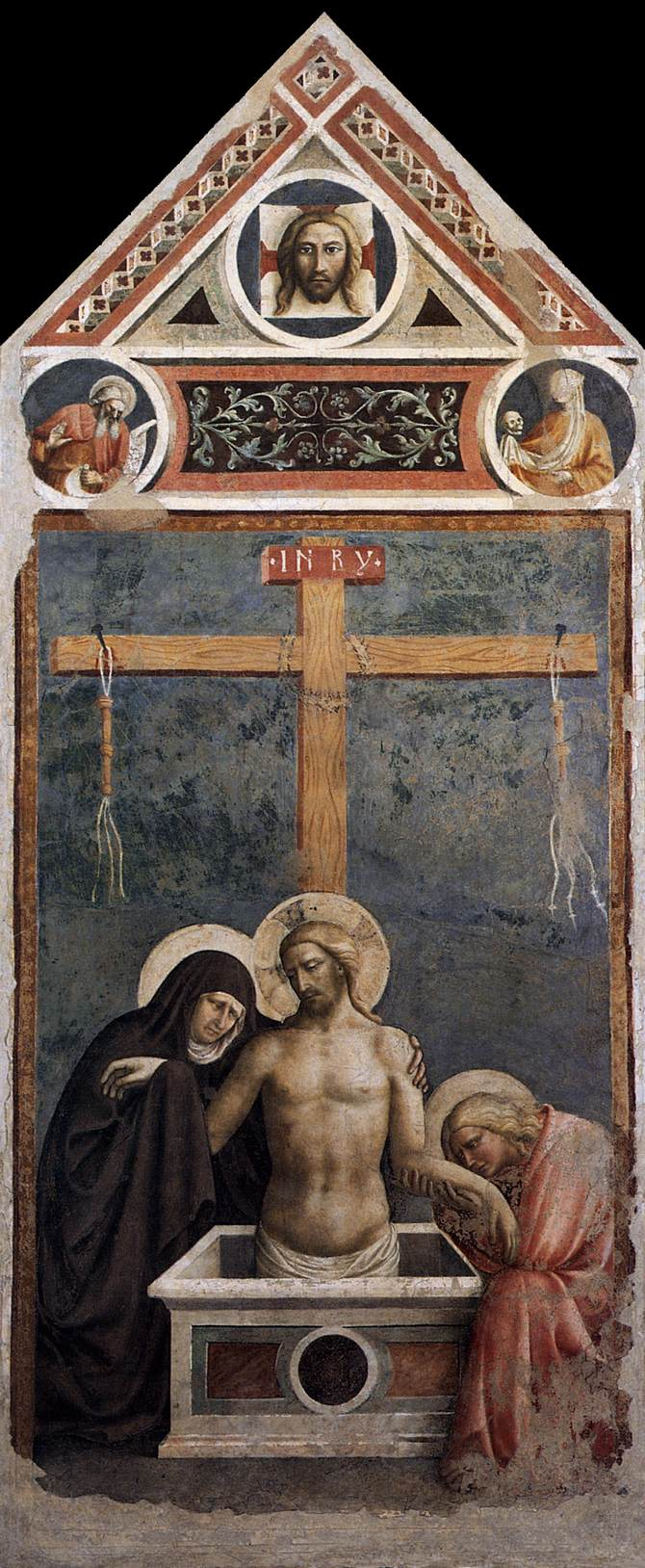
1424: Masolino, Pietà

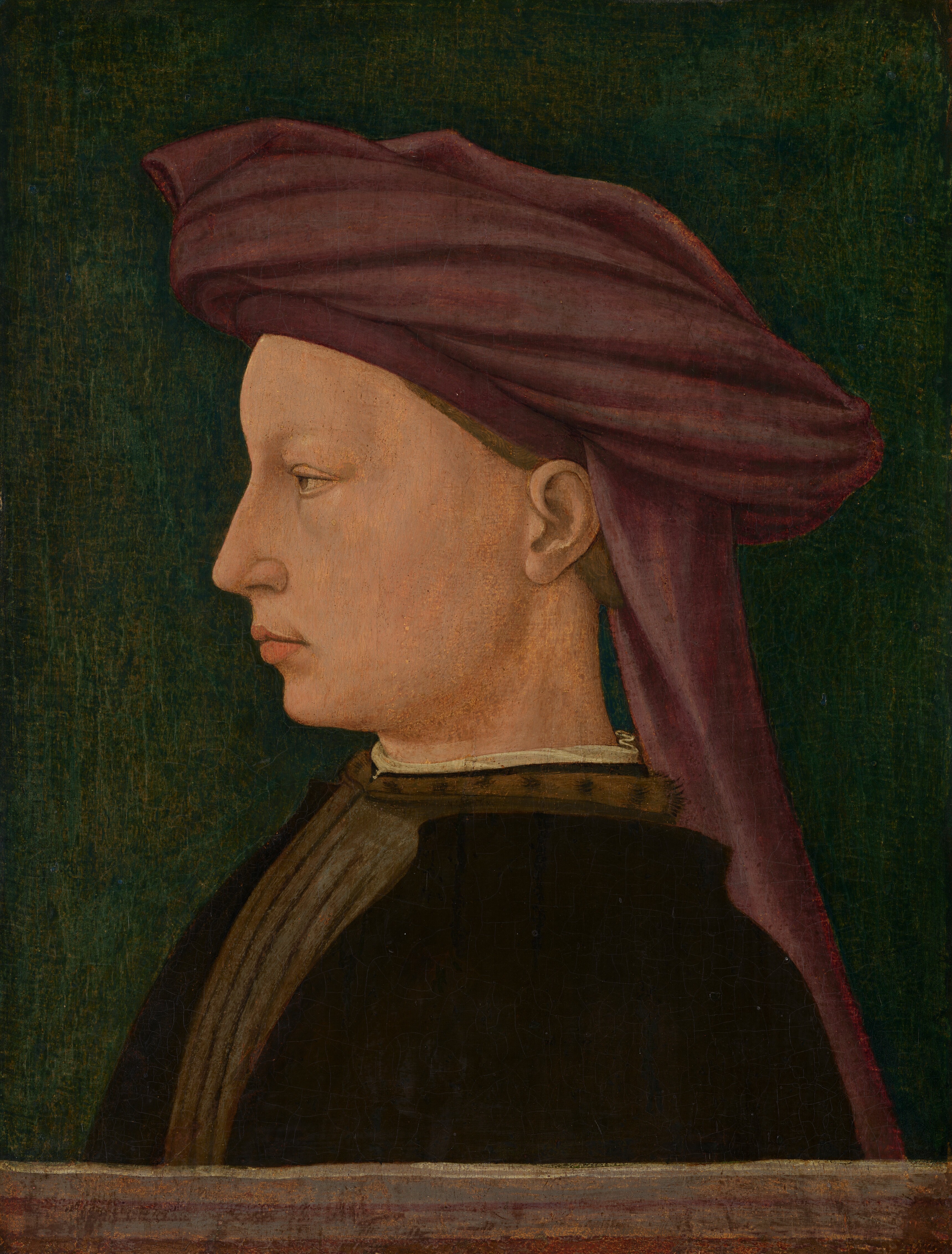
1425: Masaccio, Portrait of a Young Man

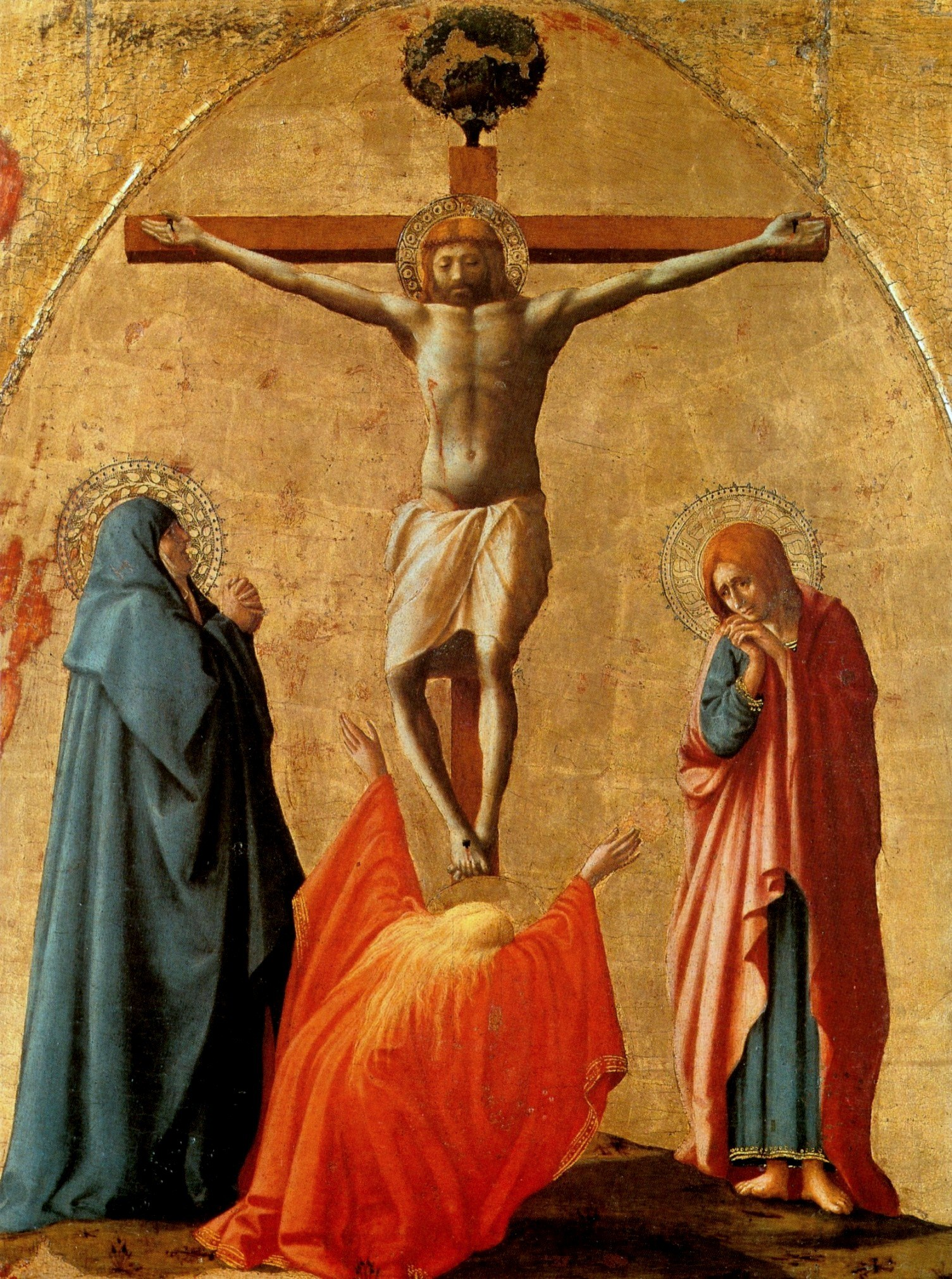
1426: Masaccio, Crucifixion

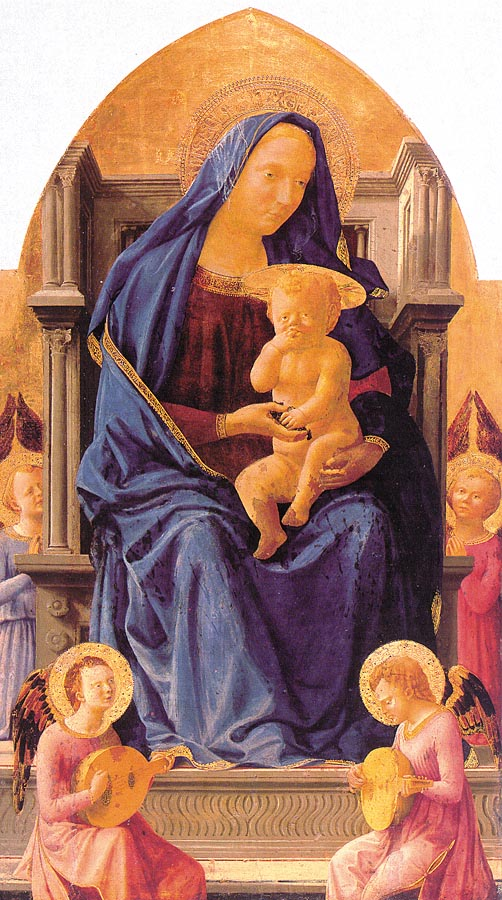
1426: Masaccio, The Madonna and Child

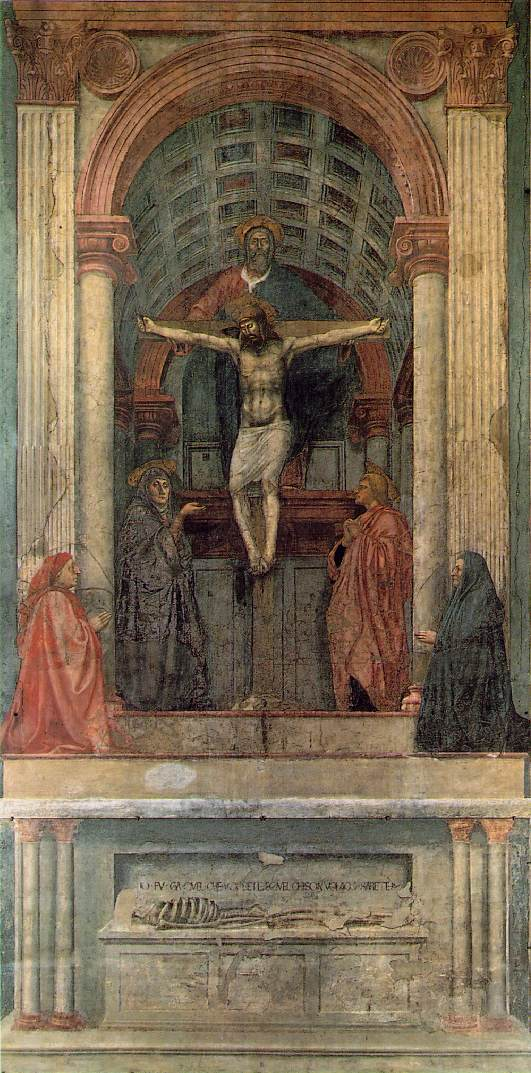
1428: Masaccio, The Holy Trinity

=== Painting ===
- 1420 (c.) Fra Angelico Christ with a Crown of Thorns
- 1420: Giovanni di Paolo paints a tiny gold-ground triptych
- 1422: Masaccio – San Giovenale Triptych
- 1423: Gentile da Fabriano – Adoration of the Magi
- c. 1424: Masaccio – Virgin and Child with St. Anne
- 1424: Masolino – Pietà
- 1425: Gentile da Fabriano – Quaratesi Polyptych
- 1425: Masaccio – Portrait of a Young Man
- 1426: Masaccio – Crucifixion
- 1426: Masaccio – The Madonna and Child
- 1428: Masaccio – The Holy Trinity

=== Sculpture ===
- 1421–1427: Donatello and Michelozzo – Tomb of Antipope John XXIII, Florence Cathedral
- 1423–1425: Donatello – Zuccone, Florence Cathedral
- c. 1425: Donatello – The Feast of Herod Baptismal font, Siena Cathedral
- 1423: Ghiberti – sculpture of St. Matthew, Orsanmichele guild center, Florence

== Births ==
- 1429–1433: Antonio del Pollaiuolo – painter (died 1498)
- 1429: Mino da Fiesole – Italian sculptor from Poppi, Tuscany (died 1484)
- 1429: Gentile Bellini – Italian painter (died 1507)
- 1427: Alesso Baldovinetti – painter (died 1499)
- 1427: Shen Zhou – Chinese painter in Ming Dynasty (died 1509)
- 1427: Antonio Rossellino – Italian sculptor (died 1478–1481)
- 1426: Maso Finiguerra – Italian goldsmith, draftsman, and engraver (died 1464)
- 1425: Simon Marmion – Netherlandish painter (died 1489)
- 1425: Andrea Aleksi – Albanian architect, painter and sculptor (died 1505)
- 1425: Antoine Le Moiturier – French sculptor (died 1495)
- 1421: Benozzo Gozzoli – Italian Renaissance painter from Florence (died 1497)
- 1421: Andrea del Castagno – Italian fresco painter from Florence (died 1457)
- 1421: Lucas Moser – German Late-Gothic painter (died 1492)
- 1421: Andreas Ritzos – Greek icons painter (died 1492)
- 1420: Barthélemy d'Eyck – Early Netherlandish artist who worked in France as a painter and manuscript illuminator (died 1470)
- 1420: Giovanni Francesco da Rimini – Italian painter (died 1469)
- 1420: Matteo di Andrea de' Pasti – Italian medalist (died 1467–1468)
- 1420: Jean Fouquet – French painter, a master of both panel painting and manuscript illumination, and the apparent inventor of the portrait miniature (died 1481)
- 1420: Bartolomeo Caporali – Italian painter (died 1505)
- 1420: Loyset Liédet – early Netherlandish miniaturist and illuminator (died 1479)
- 1420: Nikolaus Gerhaert – Dutch sculptor (died 1473)
- 1420: Master E. S. – German engraver, goldsmith, and printmaker (died 1468)
- 1420: Sesshū Tōyō – master of suibokuga (ink painting), and a Rinzai Zen Buddhist priest (died 1506)
- 1420: Benedetto Bonfigli – Italian painter active around Umbria (died 1496)
- 1420–1425: Fra Carnevale – Italian painter of the Quattrocento (died 1484)

== Deaths ==
- 1428: Andrea di Bartolo – Italian painter of the Sienese School (born 1360–1370)
- 1428: Masaccio, Italian painter (born 1401)
- 1427: Gentile da Fabriano – Italian painter known for his participation in the International Gothic style (died 1370)
- 1427: Lorenzo di Bicci – Italian painter of the Florentine school (born 1350)
- 1426: Hubert van Eyck – Flemish painter and older brother of Jan van Eyck (born 1366)
- 1425: Lorenzo Monaco – Florentine painter (born 1370)
- 1424: Lluís Borrassà – Spanish Gothic Era painter (born 1350)
- 1422: Conrad von Soest – German Gothic painter (born 1370)
- 1422: Taddeo di Bartolo – Italian painter of the Sienese School during the early Renaissance (born 1362)
- 1421: Antonio Bamboccio – Italian painter and sculptor of the Gothic period (born 1351)
- 1421: Nanni di Banco – Italian sculptor from Florence (born 1384)
