= 1170s in art =

- 1160s
- 1170s in art
- 1180s

Art timeline

The decade of the 1170s in art involved some significant events.

== Events ==
- 1171: End of the Fatimid art period in Egypt and North Africa

== Works ==
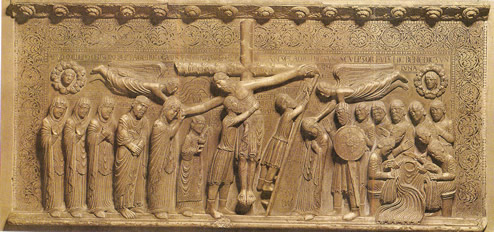
Benedetto Antelami, Deposition, 1178 (Baptistry of Parma)

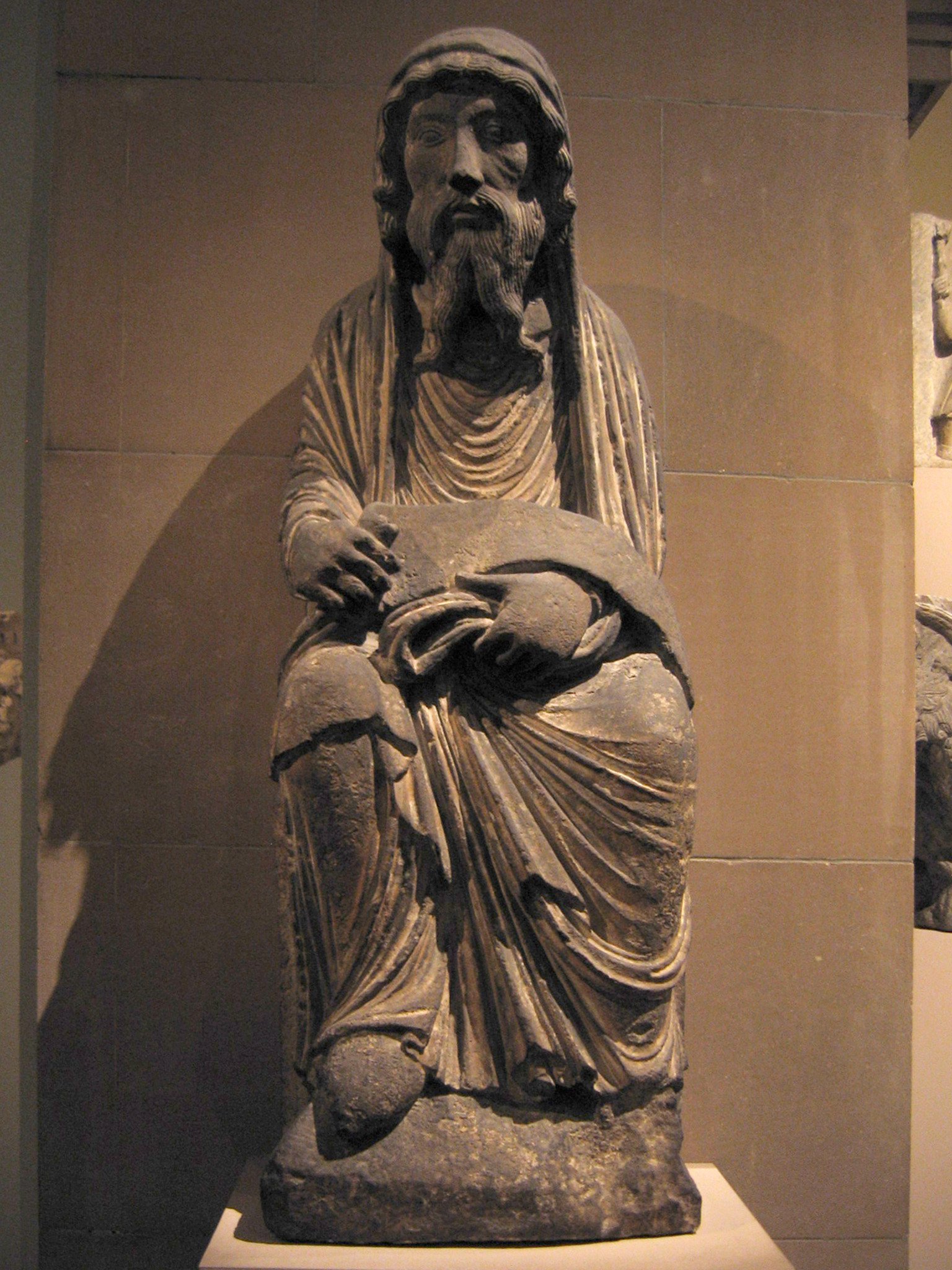
Unknown artist, Limestone Sculpture of the Old Testament Priest Aaron, c. 1170

- 1178: Lin Tinggui and Zhou Jichang complete The Five Hundred Luohan
- 1178: Benedetto Antelami completes Deposition
- 1176: Unkei sculpts Dainichi Nyorai at Enjō-ji in Nara
- 1173–1176: Zhang Shengwen completes The Sakyamuni Buddha
- 1170: Unknown artist completes Limestone Sculpture of the Old Testament Priest Aaron
- 1170: Artist(s) complete the Hunterian Psalter illuminated manuscript

== Births ==
- 1178: Wuzhun Shifan – Chinese painter, calligrapher, and prominent Zen Buddhist monk (died 1279)
- 1176: Fujiwara Nobuzane – Japanese nise-e painter (died 1265)
- 1174: Liu Songnian – Song dynasty Chinese artist (died 1224)
- 1173: Tankei – Japanese sculptor of the Kei school of sculptors (died 1256)

== Deaths ==
- 1179: Hildegard of Bingen – German writer, composer, philosopher, Christian mystic, Benedictine abbess, visionary, polymath, poet, and producer of miniature Illuminations (born 1098)
