= 1320s in art =

- 1310s
- 1320s in art
- 1330s
Other topics in 1320s:
- Music

Art timeline

The decade of the 1320s in art involved some significant events.

== Art ==
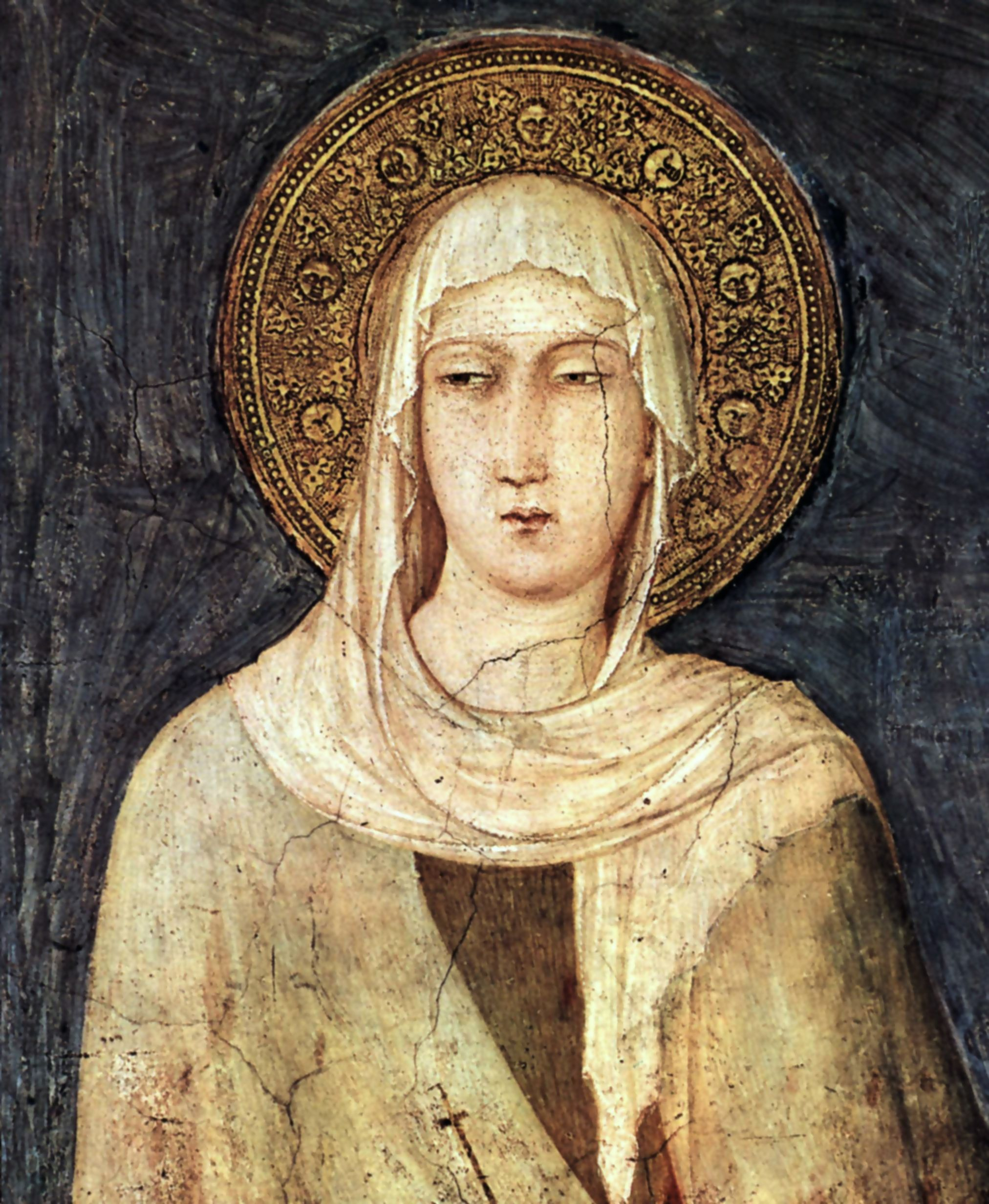
Simone Martini, fresco detail depicting Saint Clare of Assisi, (1322–26), Lower basilica of San Francesco, Assisi

- 1320: Église Notre-Dame de l'Assomption, Bergheim begun
- 1322–1326: Simone Martini completes fresco depicting Saint Clare of Assisi in Lower basilica of San Francesco, Assisi
- 1328: Giotto Baroncelli – Altarpiece Polyptych, Baroncelli Chapel, Basilica di Santa Croce, Florence
- 1329:
  - Pietro Lorenzetti – Carmelite polyptych, and The Prophet Elisha
  - Lorenzo Maitani – The Eagle: Symbol of St John sculpture
  - Andrea Pisano commissioned to design bronze doors for the Florence Baptistery

== Births ==
- 1325: Puccio Capanna – Italian painter of the first half of the 14th century, who lived and worked in Assisi
- 1325: Niccolò da Bologna – Italian manuscript illuminator (died 1403)
- 1324: Giottino – Italian painter from Florence (died 1369)
- 1322: Matteo Giovanetti – Italian religious-themed fresco painter (died 1368)
- 1320: Giusto de' Menabuoi – Italian painter of the early Renaissance (died 1391)
- 1320: Gennaro di Cola – Italian Trecento painter active mainly in Naples (died 1370)

== Deaths ==
- 1328: Li Shixing – Chinese landscape painter during the Yuan Dynasty (born 1282)
- 1327: Ren Renfa – Chinese painter of horses, people, flowers and birds (born 1254)
- 1325: Filippo Rusuti – Italian painter and mosaicist (born 1255)
- 1322: Zhao Mengfu – Chinese scholar, painter and calligrapher during the Yuan Dynasty (born 1254)
- 1320: Li Kan – Chinese painter during the Yuan Dynasty (born 1245)
- 1320: Filippo Tesauro – Italian painter active mainly in Naples (born 1260)
