= Antonio del Rincón (painter) =

Spanish painter

Antonio del Rincón (ca. 1446–1500) was a 15th-century Spanish painter and artist, a court painter to los Reyes Católicos, Ferdinand II of Aragon and Isabella I of Castile.

Born in Guadalajara, Spain around 1446, del Rincón is supposed to have studied painting in Italy, either in Rome or Florence, possibly under Andrea del Castagno or Domenico Ghirlandajo. Upon his return to Spain he was appointed court painter by the Catholic Monarchs, whose portraits he painted. He was awarded the Order of St. Jago for his contributions to the court, and has been described by 19th-century art historians to be "considered as the founder of the Spanish school [of painting]" and "the first distinguished Spanish painter".
