= Giovanni da Santo Stefano da Ponte =

Italian painter

Giovanni da Santo Stefano da Ponte (1306–1365) was an Italian painter, active in his native Florence. He was a pupil of Buonamico Buffalmacco, and painted portraits and devotional subjects. He worked at Arezzo.
