= Wuzhun Shifan =

Chinese calligrapher and Buddhist monk

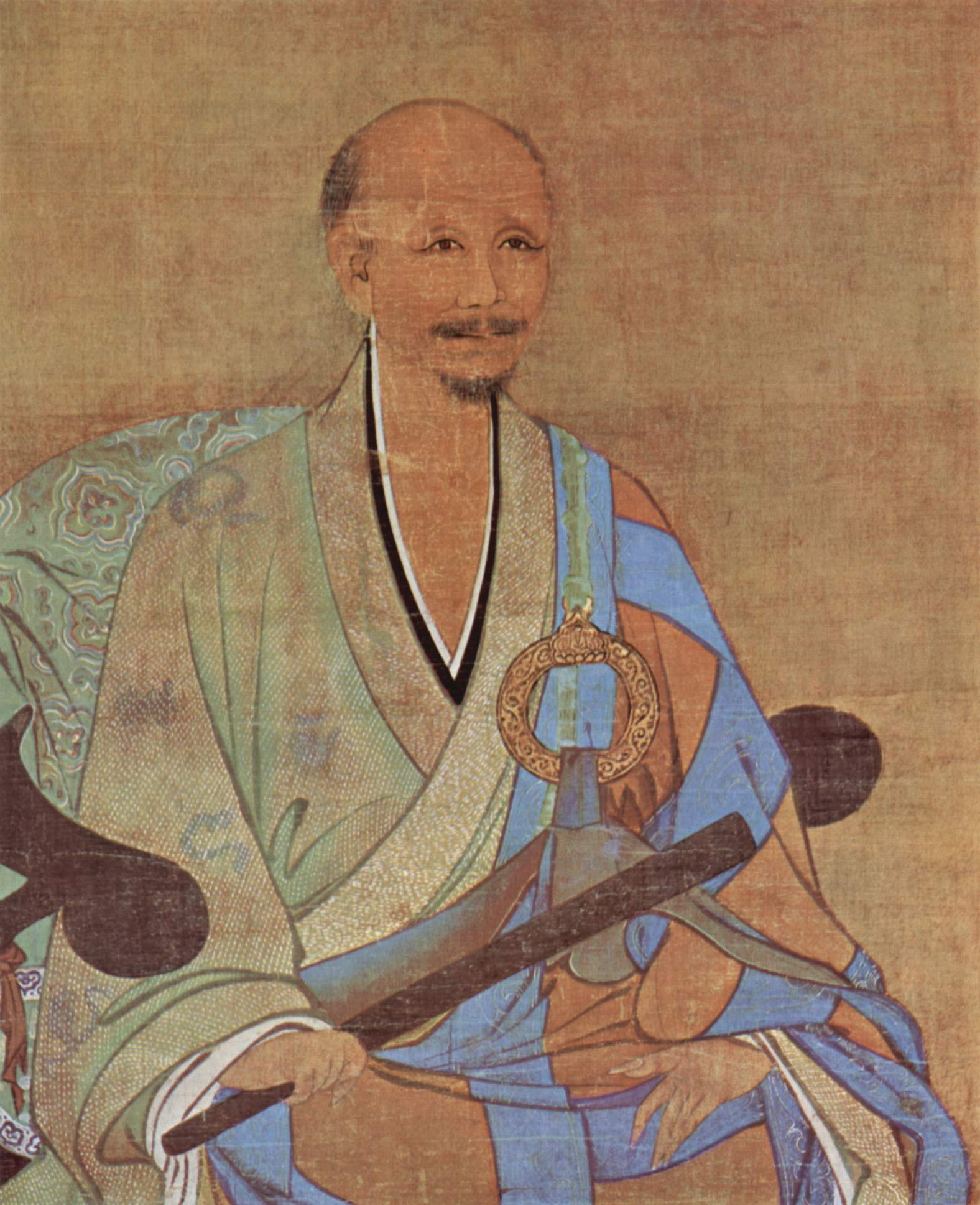
- Portrait of Zen master Wuzhun Shifan, painted in 1238, Song Dynasty.
- Title: Ch'an-shih

Personal life
- Born: 1178 Sichuan Province, China
- Died: 1249 (aged 70–71) China
- Occupation: Buddhist monk, calligrapher, painter

Religious life
- Religion: Buddhism
- School: Chan Buddhism

Senior posting
- Based in: China

Wuzhun Shifan (Chinese: 無準師範; Wade-Giles: Wu Chun Shih Fan; 1178–1249) was a Chinese calligrapher, and Chan (Zen) Buddhist monk who lived during the late Song Dynasty (960–1279).

== Life ==
Wuzhun Shifan was born in Zitong, Sichuan province, China. He eventually became a Buddhist abbot at the Temple of Mount Jingshan. He was once summoned by Emperor Lizong of Song (理宗; r. 1224–1264) in 1233 in order to share with him the doctrine of Chan (Zen) Buddhism, discussing Dharma with the emperor. For this Wuzhun was given the title Fojian Yuanzhao Chanshi (Mirror of the Buddha, Zen Teacher) as well as a gold-embroidered kaśaya that he wears in his portrait painting of 1238.

Wuzhun had many disciples who studied under him. This included Enni Ben'en (圓爾辯圓; 1201–1280; Shoichi Kokushi), who studied under Wuzhun in China from 1235 to 1241 and later brought Wuzhun's teachings to Japan. Afterwards, Enni helped cement greater acceptance for Zen teaching in Japan and aided in the establishment of the Tōfuku-ji temple of Kyoto in 1236.

== Calligraphy and artwork ==
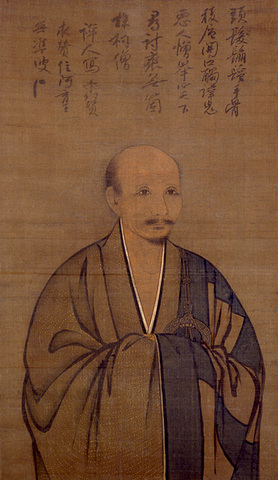
A painting of Wuzhun Shifan kept at Gunma Prefectural Museum of History, Takasaki, Gunma, Japan, by an anonymous Japanese artist of the Nanbokucho period (1334–1392)

Some of Wuzhun's written calligraphy that was handed down to Enni is still preserved on plaques found at Tōfuku-ji, and a scroll of Wuzhun's calligraphy was even presented to the Tokugawa family as a gift to the shōgun. There is also a written letter of Wuzhun Shifan, dated to 1242, that is now preserved as a national treasure of calligraphy at the Tokyo National Museum.

Wuzhun Shifan's written inscription appears on the 13th century Chinese painting A Monk Riding a Mule, housed in the Collection of John M. Crawford Jr. It is possible that he painted the picture, although it is unknown if he is the true author of the artwork.

Wuzhun's portrait was painted in 1238 by an anonymous artist, taken to Japan by Enni Ben'en in 1241, and is still located at Tōfuku-ji in Kyoto, Japan. It has been designated at National Treasure in the category paintings. The painting also bears an inscription penned by Wuzhun Shifan. Bernard Faure writes that it is painted in the Chan priest portrait style, known as dingxiang or zhenxiang (Japanese: chinzō). Like others of its style, the Chan monk sits in a lotus posture, donning in full monastic robes, with the monk's shoes placed at a footstool below and his right hand grasping a whisk or staff.

== See also ==
- History of the Song Dynasty
- List of Chinese people
- Culture of the Song Dynasty
- Chinese Buddhism
- Buddhist art
