= 13th century in music =

12th century in music – 13th century in music – 1300s in music

== Events ==
- c.1206 – A Minnesang contest, the Sängerkrieg auf der Wartburg, is held in Eisenach. Competitors included Walther von der Vogelweide, Heinrich von Ofterdingen, Reinmar von Zweter, and Klingsor.
- 1221 – the Vienna city laws (renewed in 1244) declared itinerant minstrels to have no legal rights, while minstrels resident in a parish were exempted and therefore were able to develop organizations within the framework of municipal law.
- 1254 – Alfonso X of Castile establishes a chair of music at the University of Salamanca.
- 1259 – An organ is installed in the Cathedral of Worms.

== Bands formed ==
- 1212. The Thomanerchor is founded in Leipzig.

== Treatises ==
- 1271 – Amerus, Practica artis musicae.
- 1274 – Elias Salomo, Scientia artis musicae.
- 1279 – Anonymous of St Emmeram, De musica mensurata (Munich, Bayerische Staatsbibliothek, Cod. Lat. Mon. [Cim.] 14523), one of the two main treatises on the theory of Notre Dame polyphony.

== Compositions ==
- 1201 – Raimbaut de Vaqueiras, "Ara pot hom conoisser e proar" (chanson de croisade, celebrating the election of Boniface de Monferrat as leader of the Fourth Crusade)
- 1204–05 – Raimbaut de Vaqueiras, "No·m agrad' iverns ni pascors"
- 1227–34 – A Play of Daniel with music is written at the school of Beauvais Cathedral.
- 1235–39 – Theobald I of Navarre, "Seignor, sachiés, qui or ne s’en ira" (chanson de croisade)
- 1239 – Theobald I of Navarre, "Au tens plain de felonie" (chanson de croisade)
- 1239–40 – Theobald I of Navarre, "Li dous penser et li dous souvenir" (chanson de croisade)

== Births ==
- 1201
  - 30 May – Thibaut IV, Count of Champagne and Brie, King of Navarre (d. 7 July 1253)
  - date unknown – Richart de Fournival, French trouvère (d. 1260)
- 1216
  - date unknown – Safi al-Din al-Urmawi, musician and theorist (d. 1296)
- 1217
  - date unknown – John I, Duke of Brittany, French trouvère (d. 1286)
- 1221
  - 23 November – Alfonso X of Castile, Spanish monarch, poet, and composer (d. 1284)
- 1291
  - 31 October – Philippe de Vitry, French composer, music theorist, and poet (d. 1361)

== Deaths ==
- 1201 – Léonin (died this year or soon after)
- 1203
  - May or June – Le Chastelain de Couci, French trouvère
- 1204
  - 12 December – Maimonides, Jewish rabbi and writer on music (b. 1135 or 1138)
- 1207
  - 4 September – Raimbaut de Vaqueiras, troubadour (b. c.1155)
- 1231
  - 25 December – Folquet de Marselha, troubadour (b. c.1155)
- 1236
  - 26 December – Philip the Chancellor (b. c.1165)
- 1245
  - date unknown – Guillaume le Vinier, French trouvère (b. c.1190)
- 1253
  - 7 July – Thibaut IV, Count of Champagne and Brie, King of Navarre (b. 30 May 1201)
- 1260
  - date unknown – Richart de Fournival, French trouvère
- 1284
  - 4 April – Alfonso X of Castile
- 1286
  - 8 October – John I, Duke of Brittany, French trouvère (b. 1217)
- 1288 – Adam de la Halle (possibly survived until at least 1306)
