= 14th century in architecture =

== Buildings and structures ==
=== Buildings ===
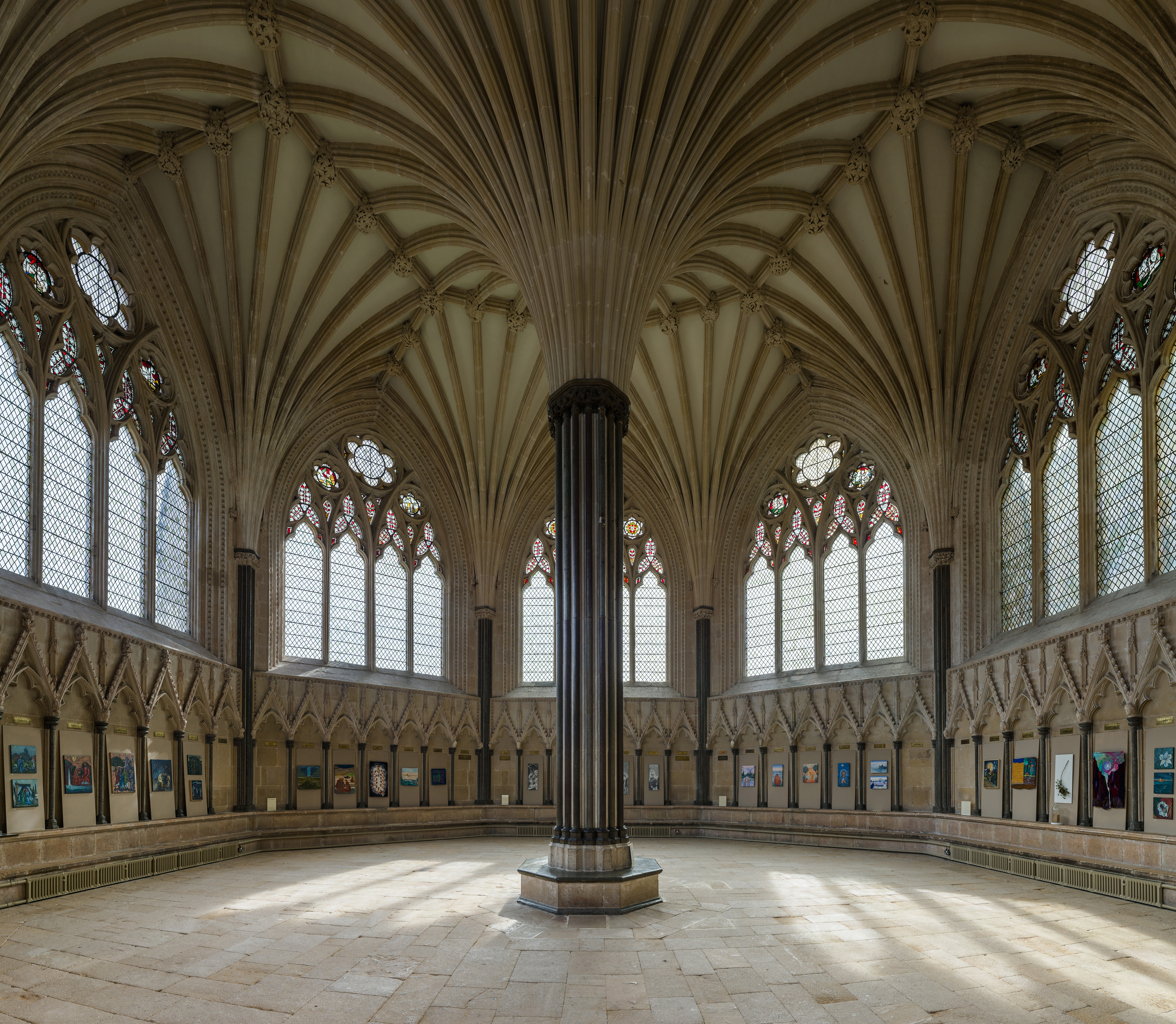
Wells Cathedral chapter house

- c. 1300
  - Nidaros Cathedral is completed in Trondheim, Norway.
  - Spire of St Wulfram's Church, Grantham, England, is completed.
- c. 1300–1310 – Great Coxwell Barn in the Vale of White Horse in England is built.
- 1302–1312 – Dome of Soltaniyeh in Ilkhanate Persia is built.
- 1304
  - Ypres Cloth Hall is completed.
  - St John the Evangelist's Church, Newton Arlosh, England, is completed.
- 1306 – Wells Cathedral chapter house in England is completed in Decorated Gothic style.
- 1308
  - The Priest's House, Muchelney, England, is built.
  - The Yuchang Lou Yuchang Lou in Yuan dynasty China is built.
- 1309 – Construction begins on the Doge's Palace in Venice (completed in 1424).
- c. 1310–1320 – Funerary chapel, Chora Church of the Monastery of Christ, Constantinople, is built.
- 1311 – Alai Darwaza gateway in Qutb complex, Delhi Sultanate, is completed.
- 1314
  - Completion of Old St Paul's Cathedral in London.
  - Construction of Chapel of Dzordzor, one of the Armenian Monastic Ensembles of Iran.
- 1320 – Brig o' Balgownie, crossing the River Don in Old Aberdeen, Scotland, is completed.
- 1322
  - The central tower of Ely Cathedral in England collapses, and its replacement by a central octagon is begun.
  - Cologne Cathedral choir consecrated.
- 1323
  - Chausath Yogini Temple, Morena, India, is built.
  - Remains of the Lighthouse of Alexandria (one of the Seven Wonders of the Ancient World) are toppled by a series of earthquakes.
- 1324 – Minaret of the Djamaa el Kebir mosque completed in the Abdalwadid sultanate.

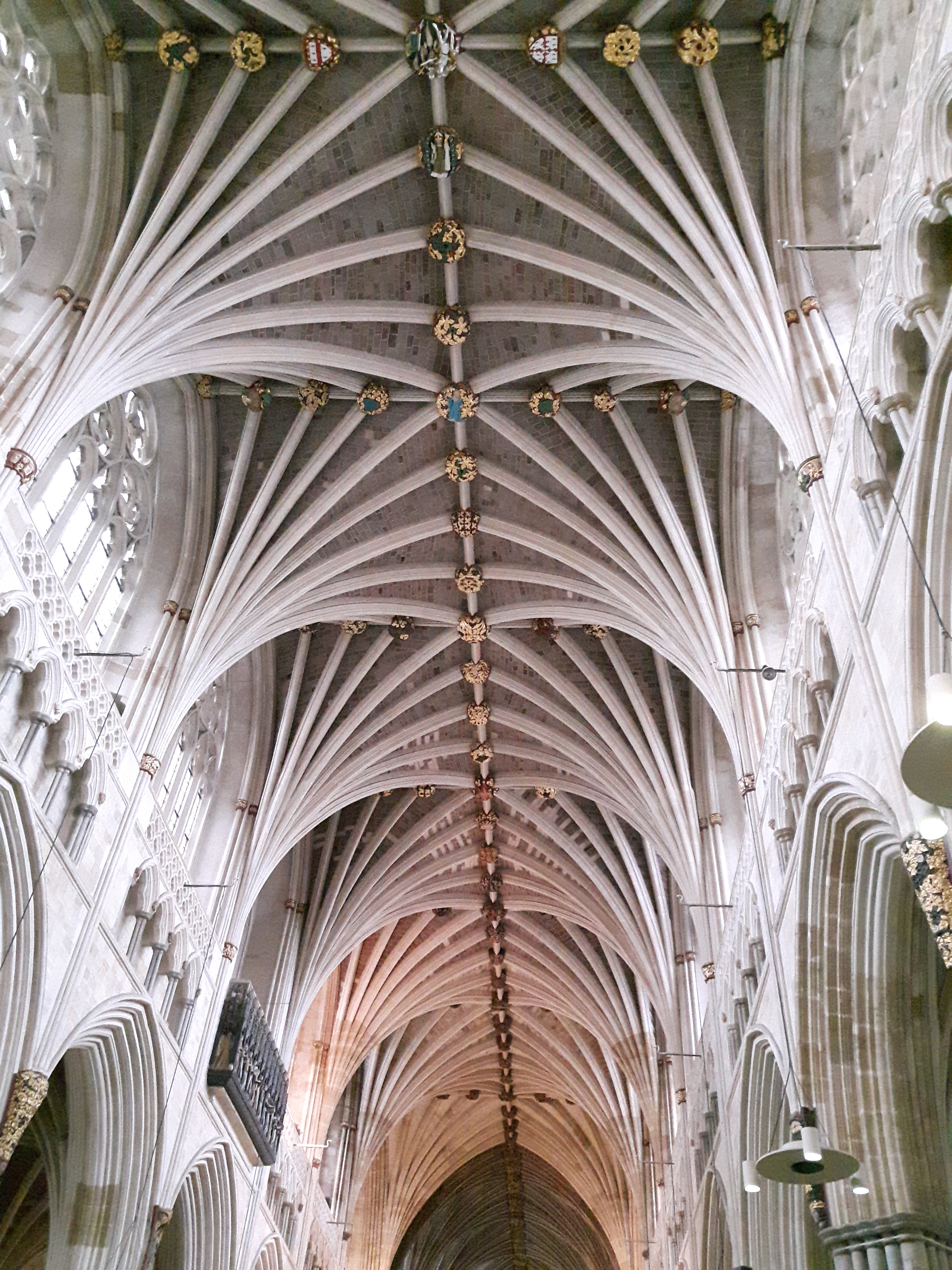
Exeter Cathedral (England)

- 1325
  - The Al-Attarine Madrasa is completed in Fes.
  - Jami Masjid, Khambhat, is built from the ruins of earlier temples in Gujarat.
- 1327 – Djinguereber Mosque in Timbuktu, Mali Empire, attributed to Abu Es Haq es Saheli, is completed.
- 1328 – Reconstruction of Exeter Cathedral (England) in the Decorated Gothic style begins (completed c. 1349).
- 1329 – Reconstruction of St. Thaddeus Monastery, one of the Armenian Monastic Ensembles of Iran, begins.
- 1330
  - Reconstruction of Saint Stepanos Monastery, one of the Armenian Monastic Ensembles of Iran.
  - Saalbau (main hall) of Cologne City Hall (Kölner Rathaus) in Germany built.
- 1331 – Construction of Västeråker Church in Sweden.
- 1332 – Tongji Bridge (Yuyao) in China completed as a stone arch bridge.
- c. 1332 – New choir at St Augustine's Abbey, Bristol in England completed in an early Decorated Gothic style.
- 1333
  - The Kapellbrücke wooden bridge in Lucerne (Switzerland) is built; by 1993 (when it is substantially destroyed by fire) it will be the world's oldest truss bridge and Europe's oldest covered bridge.
  - St Andrew's Church, Heckington, England.
- 1334 – Tongji Bridge (Jinhua) in China completed as a stone covered bridge.
- 1334–1342 – Construction of old Palais des Papes in Avignon, designed by Pierre Poisson.
- 1334–1359 – Construction of Giotto's Bell Tower in Florence, Italy.
- 1337 – Rebuilding of Gloucester Abbey in England in Perpendicular style begins.
- c. 1337 – Construction of the keep of the Château de Vincennes in France begins.
- 1338 – Insertion of strainer arches at crossing of Wells Cathedral in England by William Joy.
- 1339 – Surb Astvatsatsin Church within Noravank in Armenia, designed by Momik, is completed.
- 1340 – Gothic Albertine Choir of St. Stephen's Cathedral, Vienna, is consecrated.
- 1342–1364 – Construction of new Palais des Papes in Avignon, designed by Jean de Louvres and others.
- 1344 – November: St. Vitus Cathedral in Prague founded.
- 1347 – St. Mary's Basilica in Kraków, Poland is completed.
- 1349 – Piazza del Campo in Siena, Tuscany, paved.

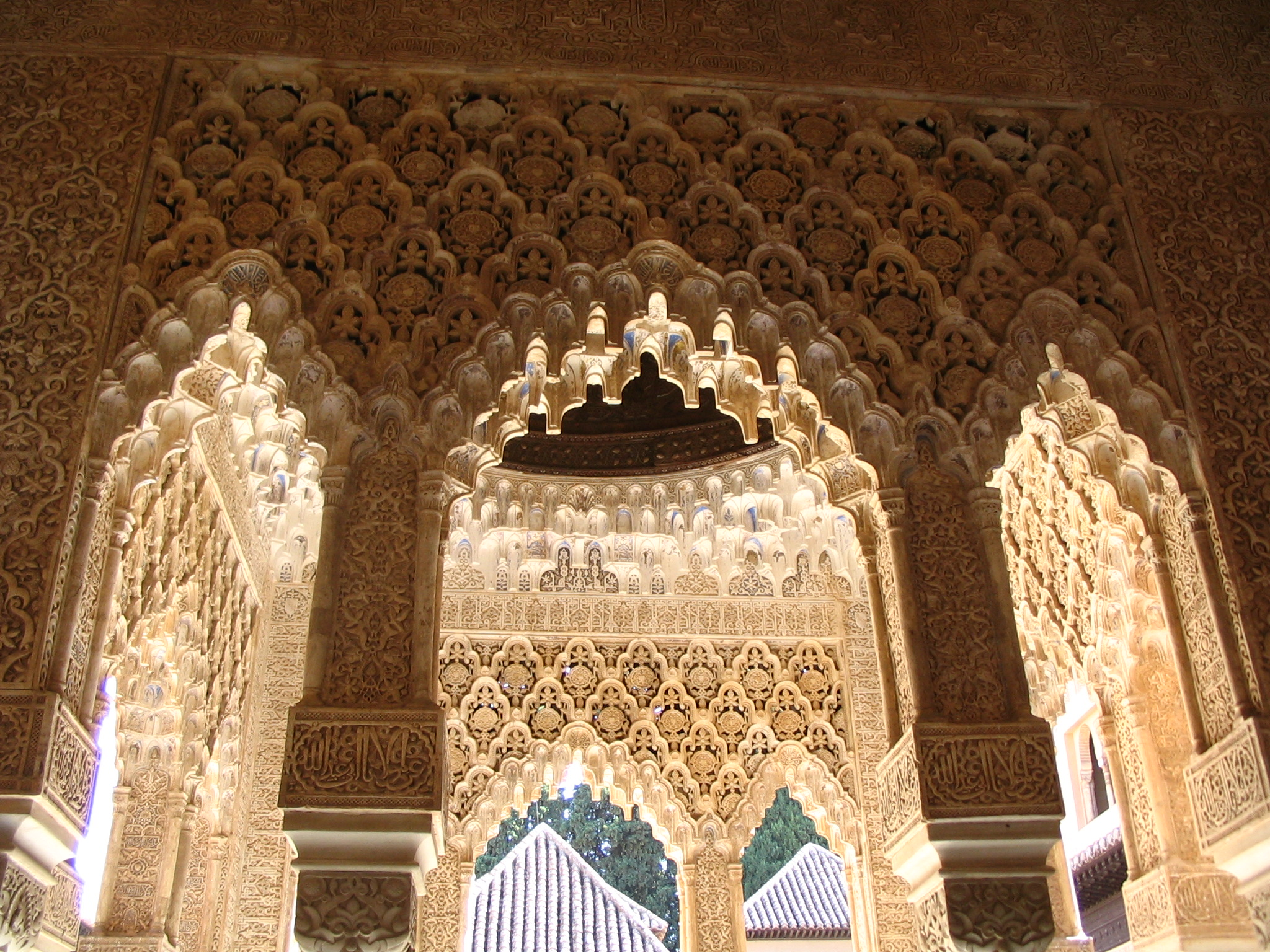
Court of the Lions in the Alhambra

- 1350 – Al-Sahibiyah Mosque in Aleppo is built.
- c. 1351 – Wat Rai Phrik temple in Bangkok is begun.
- 1354 – Madrasa Imami, Isfahan, Persia (Iran), is founded. (The tile mosaic mihrab is now in the Metropolitan Museum of Art, New York.)
- 1354–1391 – Construction of the muqarnas dome (plaster ceiling), Hall of the Abencerrajes, Court of the Lions, Palace of the Lions, Alhambra, Granada, Spain.
- 1356 – The Bou Inania Madrasa is inaugurated in Fes.
- 1356–1363 – Building of the Qibla wall with mihrab and minbar, main iwan (vaulted chamber) in the mosque of the Sultan Hasan madrasa-mausoleum-mosque complex, Cairo, Egypt.
- 1359 – Rebuilding of nave of St. Stephen's Cathedral, Vienna, begins.
- 1360
  - Work begins on the City Wall of Nanjing in Ming dynasty China.
  - Completion of nave vault at York Minster, England.
- c. 1360–1363 – Nestorian Church, Famagusta is built.
- c. 1360–1372 – Belfry added to Leaning Tower of Pisa in Italy by Tommaso di Andrea Pisano.
- c. 1360–1375 – St Andrew's Church, Alfriston, East Sussex, England, is built.
- 1363 – Pisa Baptistry in Italy completed.

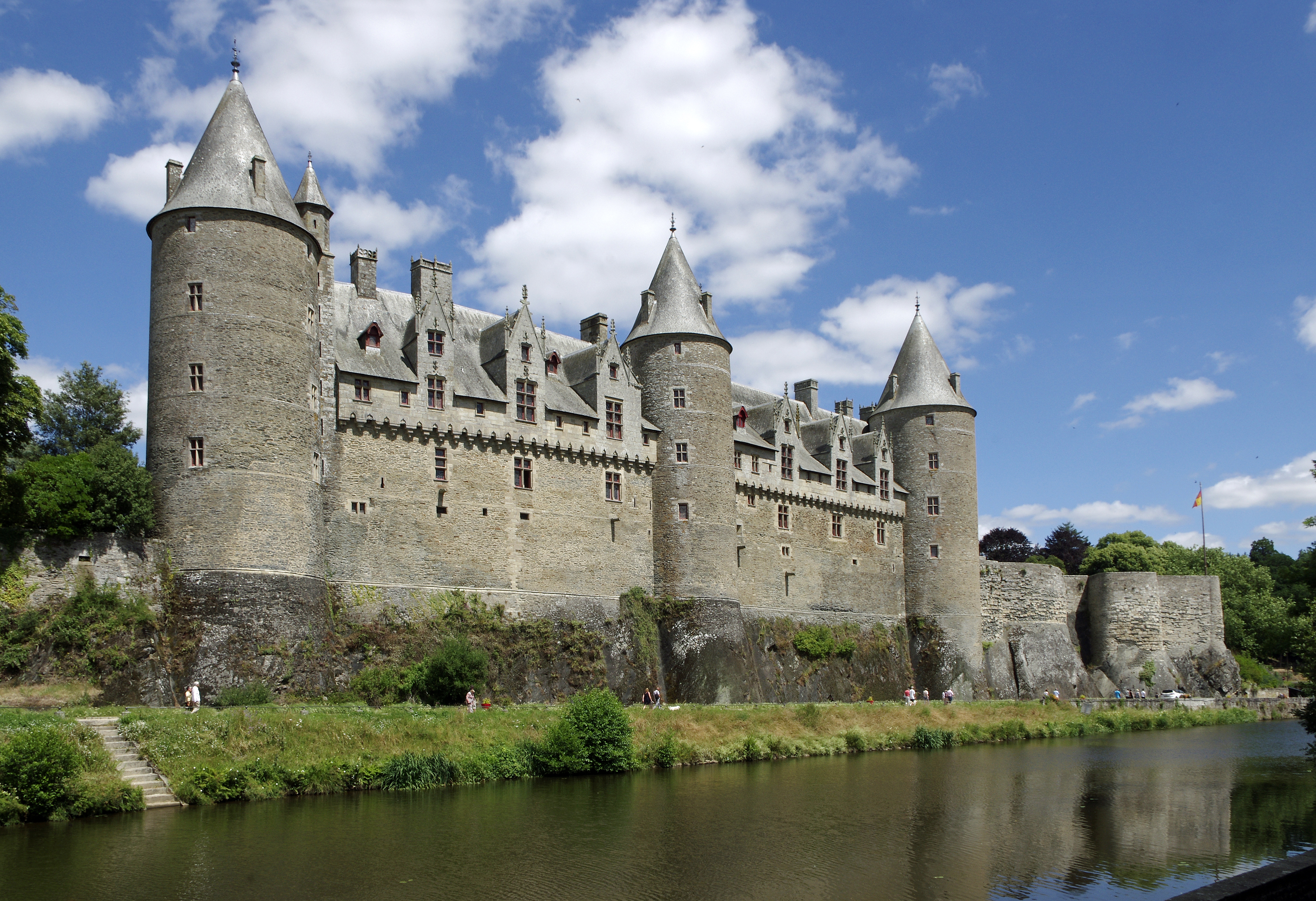
Josselin Castle in Brittany, France

- 1366
  - Mahmut Bey Mosque, Kasaba, Turkey, is commissioned
  - Jewel Tower of the Palace of Westminster in London is completed.
- 1370–1378 – Fortifications of Xi'an in Ming dynasty China are built.
- c. 1370 – Josselin Castle in Brittany rebuilding begun.
- c. 1375 – Castle of Pambre in Galicia (Spain).
- 1377
  - Ulm Minster begun under Ulrich von Ensingen.
  - First Huazang Temple at Jinding in Ming dynasty China is built.
- 1379 – Construction begins on:
  - Sainte-Chapelle de Vincennes in France (completed 1552)
  - St. Mary's Church, Gdańsk, by Heinrich Ungeradin (completed 1502).
- c. 1380 – Construction of Kuressaare Castle in modern-day Estonia started.
- 1380–1385 – Cooling Castle on the Thames Estuary of England.
- 1380–1392 – Llotja (Exchange), Barcelona, Catalonia
- 1381 – Santa Maria alla Scala, Milan.
- c. 1382 – Work is begun on a new nave of Canterbury Cathedral by master mason Henry Yevele.
- c. 1385 – In Milan, Archbishop Antonio da Saluzzo and statesman Gian Galeazzo Visconti initiate a project to design and build a new Cathedral; beginning with the demolition of buildings previously at that site (the palace of the Archbishop, the Ordinari Palace, and the Baptistry of 'St. Stephen at the Spring'). The old church of Sta. Maria Maggiore is quarried for stone. The exterior of the new Milan Cathedral will not be fully completed until nearly six centuries later; with the last external gate being finished in the 1960s.

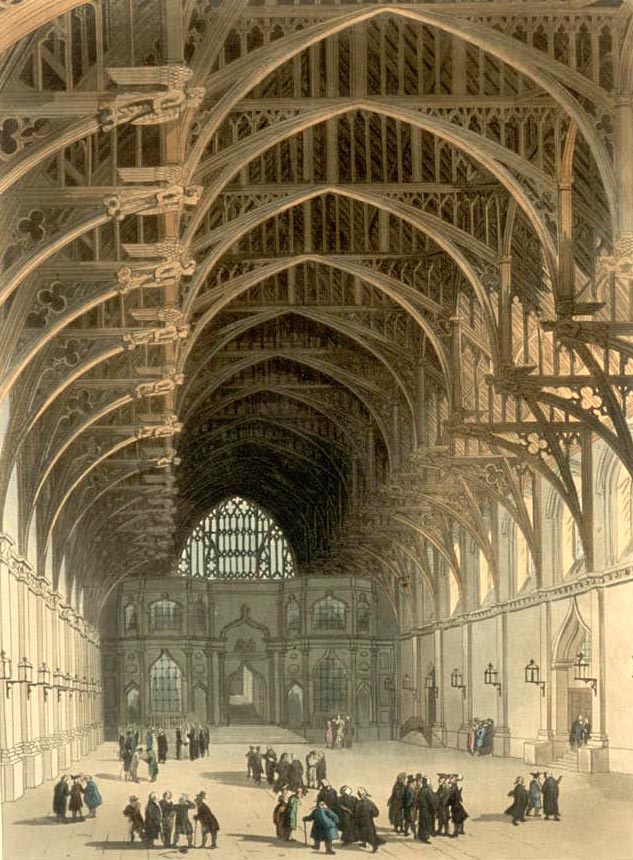
Westminster Hall

- 1386
  - The City Wall of Nanjing is completed. The south gate of the wall, known as the Gate of China, is considered to be the city gate with the most complex structure in the world.
  - (approximate date) Upper storeys of Qutb Minar in Delhi Sultanate are damaged in an earthquake and replaced.
- 1388 – Nilüfer Hatun Imareti hospice in İznik (Ottoman Empire) built.
- 1389–1405 – New Mausoleum of Khoja Ahmed Yasawi in Turkistan (Timurid Empire) is under construction (never completed).
- 1390 – Gongchen Tower in China.
- c. 1390 – Nave of St Botolph's Church, Boston, England, is completed.
- 1394 – The Gyeongbokgung of Korea is completed.
- 1395 – Hammerbeam roof of Westminster Hall assembled.
- 1396 – The Sungnyemun, Dongdaemun and Jongmyo of Korea are completed.
- 1397
  - Nave vault of St. Mary's Basilica, Kraków, completed by Nicholas Werhner.
  - Citadel of the Hồ Dynasty in Thanh Hóa, Vietnam, built.
- 1400 – Canterbury Cathedral nave is completed.

== Births ==
- 1310 – Jean d'Oisy, Brabantine architect (died 1377)
- c. 1310–1320 – Heinrich Parler, German architect and sculptor (died c. 1370)
- c. 1320 – Henry Yevele, English master mason (died 1400)
- 1333 – Peter Parler, Bohemian architect (died 1399)
- c. 1350 – Antonio di Vincenzo, Bolognese architect (died 1401/02)
- c. 1359 – Johann Parler, German-Bohemian architect and sculptor (died 1405/06)
- 1377 – Filippo Brunelleschi, Florentine architect (died 1446)
- 1386 – Donatello, born Donato di Niccolò di Betto Bardi, Florentine sculptor (died 1466)
- c. 1396 – Michelozzo, born Michelozzo di Bartolomeo Michelozzi, Florentine sculptor and architect (died 1472?)

== Deaths ==
- 1337: January 8 – Giotto, Florentine painter and architect (born 1267)
- c. 1347 – Agostino da Siena, Italian architect and sculptor (born c. 1285)
- 1352 – Matthias of Arras, French architect working in Bohemia (born c. 1290)
- c. 1364 – Alan of Walsingham, English bishop and architect
- 1387 – Masuccio Segondo, Italian architect (born 1291)

== See also ==
- Timeline of architecture
