= Tongji =

Tongji may refer to:

== Places in China ==
=== Shanghai ===
- Tongji University (同济大学), a university in Shanghai
- Tongji University station (同济大学站), a metro in Shanghai

=== Zhejiang ===
- Tongji Bridge (Jinhua) (通济桥), a large stone arch bridge in Jinhua, Zhejiang
- Tongji Bridge (Yuyao) (通济桥), a stone arch bridge in Yuyao, Zhejiang

=== Other regions ===
- Tongji Bridge (Yi County) (通济桥), a historic stone arch bridge over the Zhang River in Biyang, Yi County, Anhui
- Tongji Canal, a component of the Grand Canal
- Tongji County (通计县), former name of Shifang, Sichuan
- Tongji Lu Station (同济路站), a metro station in Foshan, Guangdong
- Tongji Medical College (同济医学院), in Wuhan, Hubei

== Other ==
- Tongji (spirit medium) (童乩), a form of Chinese shaman or oracle
