= Tongji Bridge =

Tongji Bridge (simplified Chinese: 通济桥; traditional Chinese: 通濟橋; pinyin: Tōng Jì Qiáo) can refer to:

- Tongji Bridge (Foshan)：in Foshan, Guangdong, China.
- Tongji Bridge (Jingjing)：in Jingjing County, Hebei, China.
- Tongji Bridge (Yuyao)：in Yuyao, Zhejiang, China.
- Tongji Bridge (Jinhua)：in Jinhua, Zhejiang, China.
- Tongji Bridge (Yi County)：in Yi County, Anhui, China.
- Another name of Jiangdong Bridge (江东桥)：in Zhangzhou, Fujian, China.
