= Crossing (architecture) =

Junction of the four arms of a cruciform church

Cathedral floor plan (crossing is shaded)

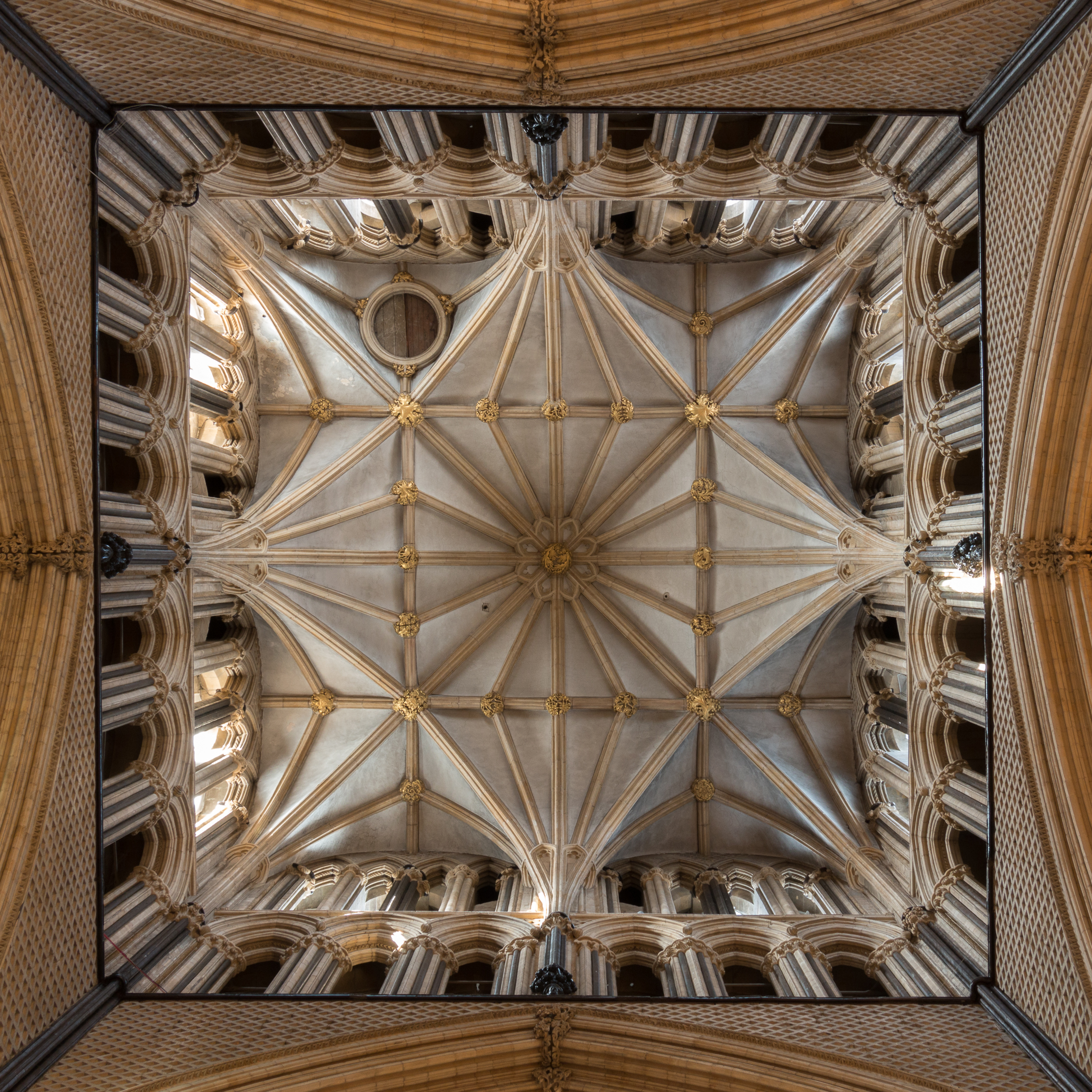
Decorative rib vaulting inside the crossing tower of Lincoln Cathedral

A crossing, in ecclesiastical architecture, is the junction of the four arms of a cruciform (cross-shaped) church. In a typically oriented church, the crossing gives access to the nave to the west, the transept arms to the north and south, and the choir to the east.

The crossing may be roofed at the same height as the rest of the nave, or it may be surmounted by a raised tower, dome, or flèche. Large stone crossing towers were common in Romanesque cathedrals and in some forms of Gothic architecture, most notably that of England and in Normandy. Gothic crossing towers often featured complex rib vaults, arcaded galleries, and high windows for light (towers admitting natural light into the crossing are also called lantern towers). Church bells were commonly installed in the space above the vault. In other cases, the roof over the crossing was marked with a lightweght cupola or flèche (a kind of small spire from the French Gothic tradition) rather than a full tower. Domes were placed over the crossings of some churches in medieval Italy. From the Italian Renaissance (starting with the construction of Brunelleschi's dome in Florence) through to the Baroque and thereafter, domes and domed cupolas over the crossing became common.

Because crossings are open on four sides, the weight of a heavy crossing tower or dome exerts immense force on the piers at the corners of the crossing, such that great skill on the part of the builders is required to ensure stable construction. In centuries past, several overambitious or poorly built crossing towers have collapsed, such as those of Beauvais Cathedral, Chichester Cathedral, and Ely Cathedral, among others. Unstable corner piers were sometimes retrofitted with additional supports to prevent collapse, as seen with the 'scissor arches' at Wells Cathedral. At Ely, the stone crossing tower that had fallen in 1322 was replaced by Sacrist Alan of Walsingham's famous octagon (completed 1328), which was later hailed by Nikolaus Pevsner as that cathedral's "... greatest individual achievement of architectural genius".

In some medieval churches, the dimensions of the crossing was used as a module or unit of measurement informing the rest of the building's plan. The nave and transept were often assigned dimensions amounting to a multiple of the length of the crossing square.

While the term 'crossing' is mostly associated with ecclesiastical architecture, secular buildings that follow a cruciform plan (such as London's Crystal Palace) may also be described as having crossings.

== Gallery ==
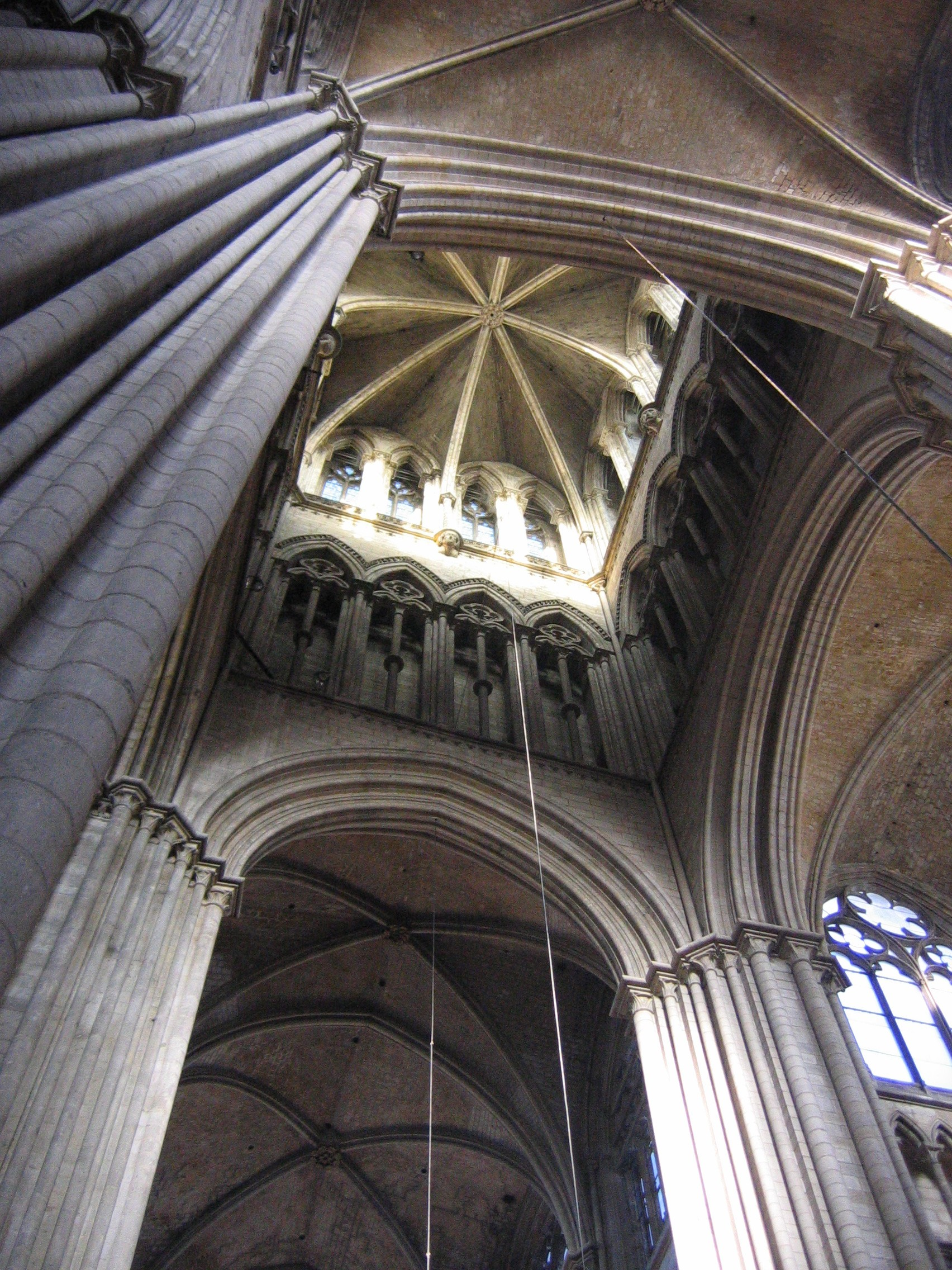
Inside the crossing tower, Rouen Cathedral

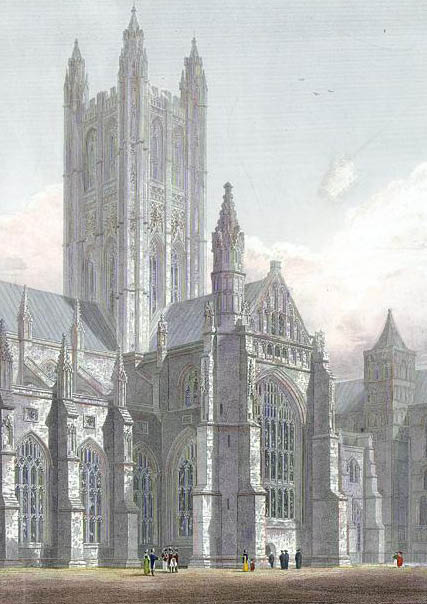
Crossing tower, Canterbury Cathedral

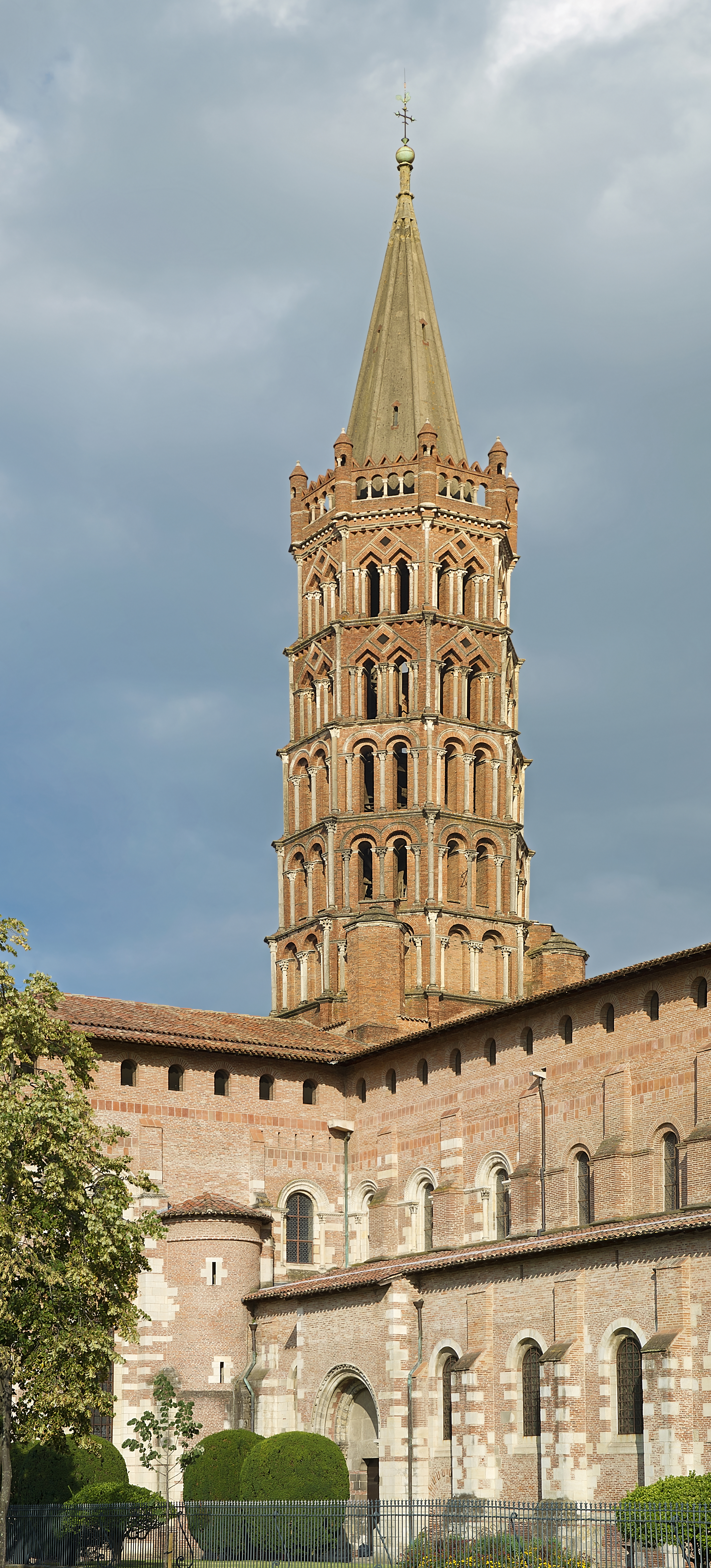
Crossing tower, Saint-Sernin de Toulouse

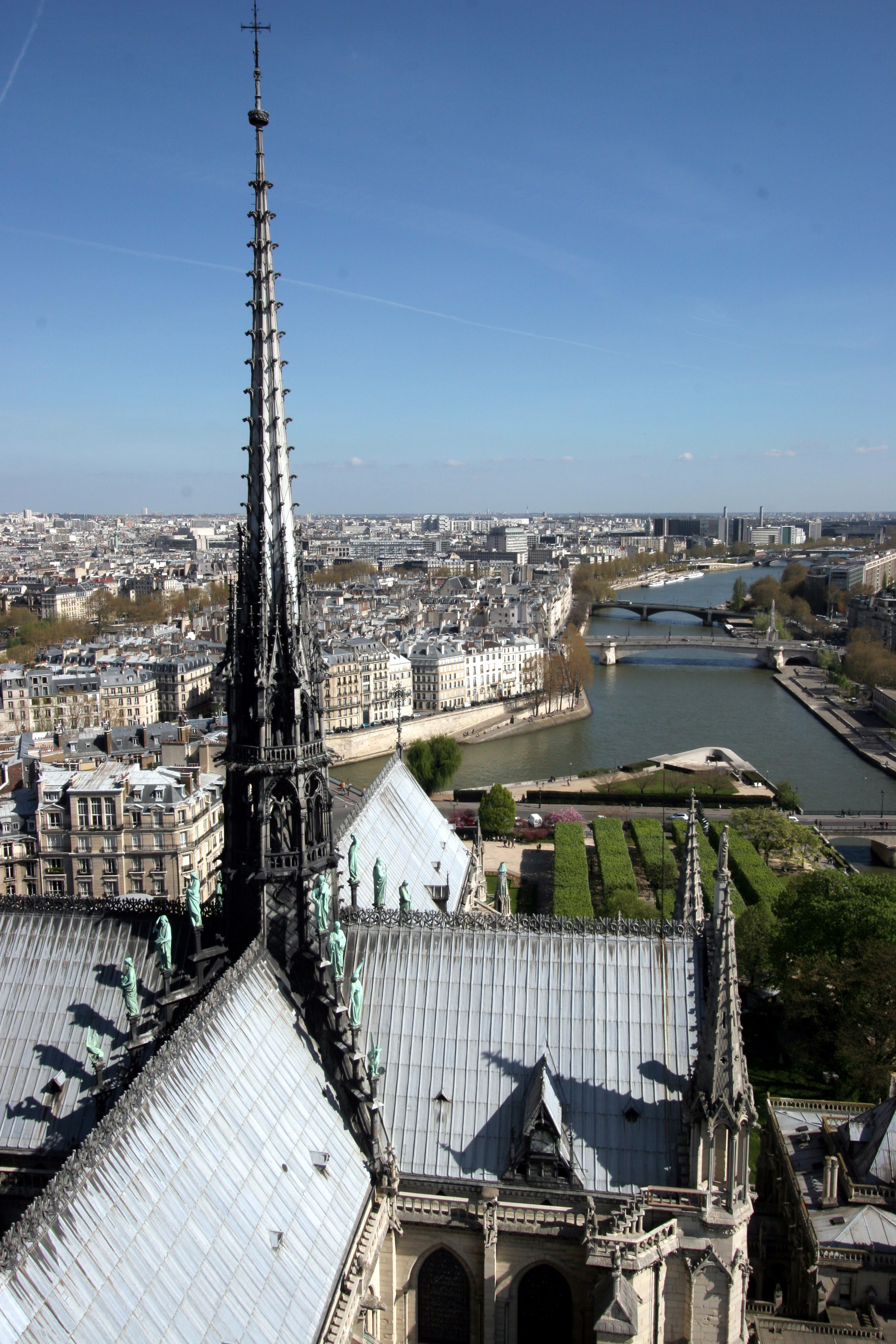
Flèche above the crossing of Notre-Dame de Paris

Wells Cathedral crossing, with scissor arches

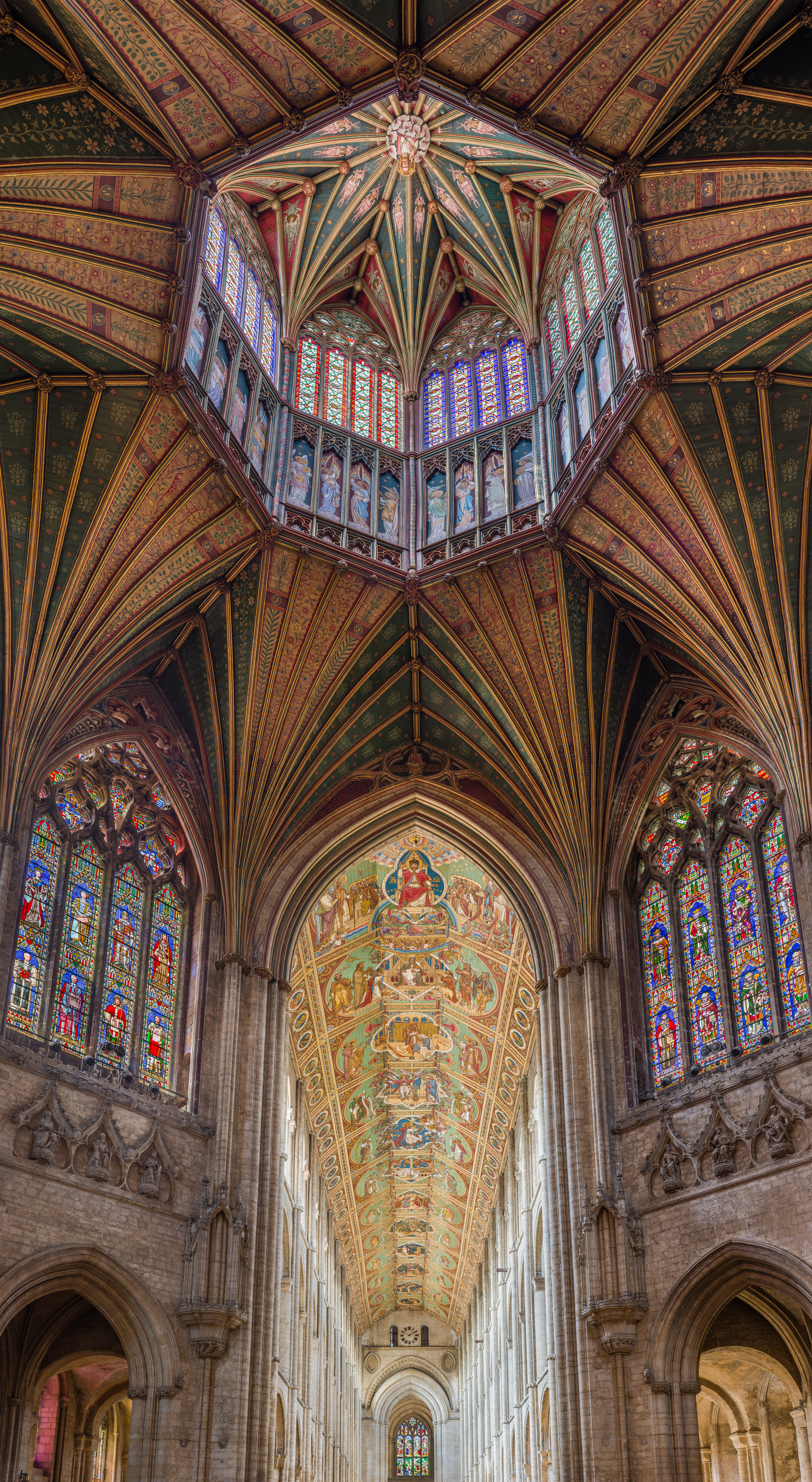
Octagonal crossing of Ely Cathedral

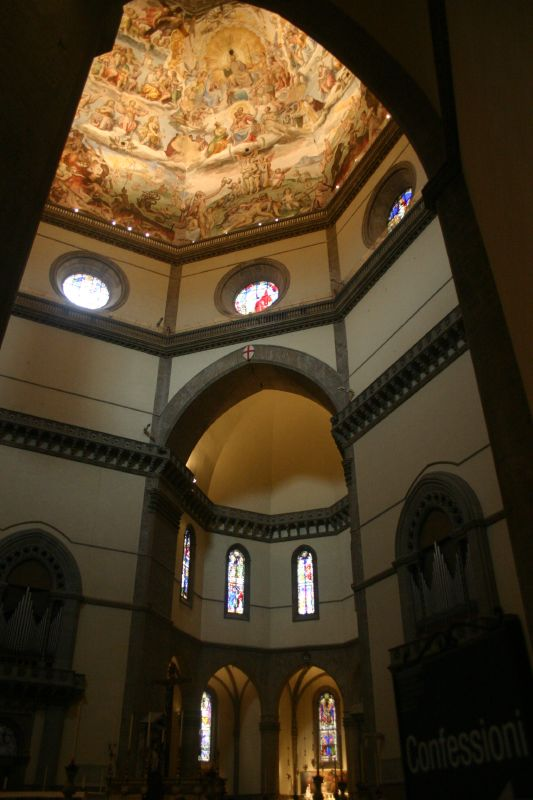
Domed crossing of Florence Cathedral

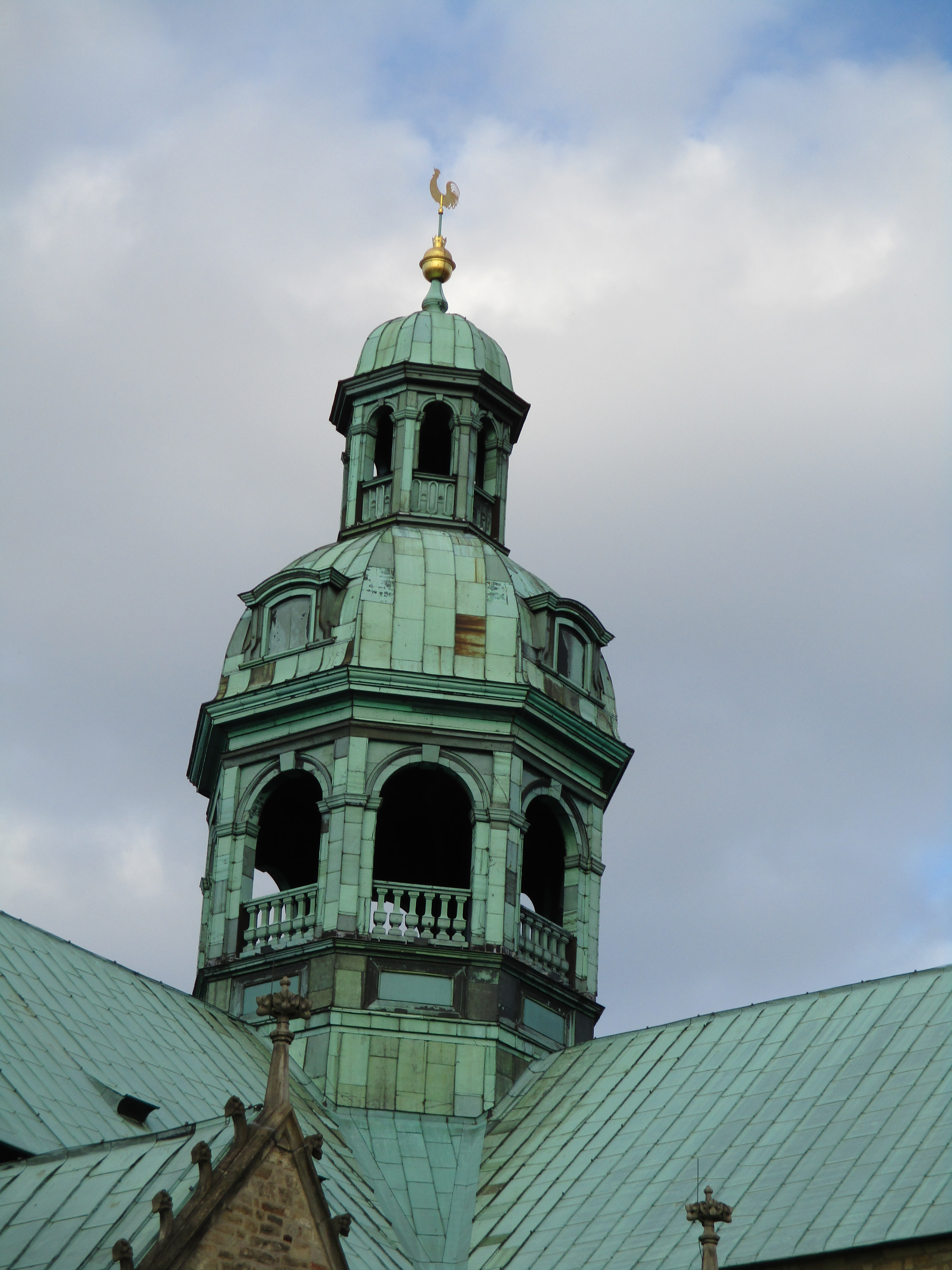
Cupola above the crossing, Hildesheim Cathedral

== Sources ==
- Heyman, Jacques [in German] (2015). "Strainer arches". Construction History. 30 (2). The Construction History Society: 1–14. ISSN 0267-7768. JSTOR 44215905.
