= Johan Zacharias Blackstadius =

Swedish painter, graphic artist and art teacher

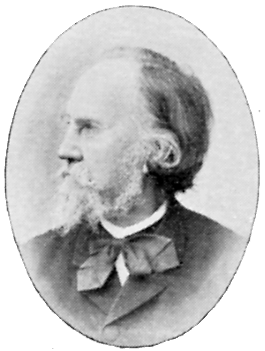
Johan Zacharias Blackstadius, from the Svenskt Porträttgalleri XX

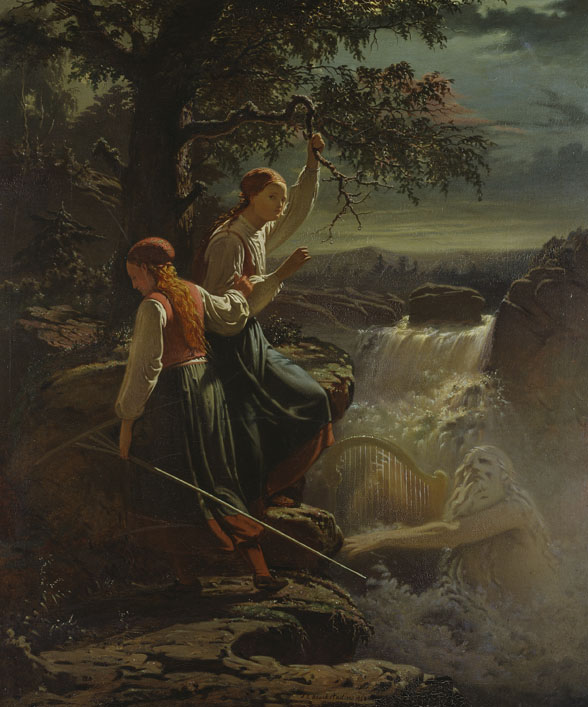
Two Peasant Girls Listening to the Strömkarlen Play

Johan Zacharias Blackstadius (14 March 1816, near Falkenberg in Halland – 25 February 1898, in Stockholm) was a Swedish painter, graphic artist and art teacher at what is now the Konstfack in Stockholm. He also restored medieval paintings at several churches. His work consists primarily of historical scenes and folklore motifs.

== Biography ==
His family had a long history in the priesthood, beginning with Laurentius Nicolai Blackstadius (1590-1640), from Blacksta Parish in Södermanland.

His father, Adolf, was a sea captain. When he was eight, he accompanied his father on a voyage that would last for six years. He received his education from local, private schools while the ship was in port. Upon their return to Sweden, he was apprenticed to the lithographer, Karl Fredrik Natanael Schultén (1797-1868), who was his mother's half-brother. At the same time, he took classes at the Royal Swedish Academy of Fine Arts.

In 1844, after travelling around Sweden, he went to Finland where he stayed for five years; making his living by painting portraits. By 1850, he had earned enough money to travel throughout Europe; a study trip that included a stay at the studios of Thomas Couture in Paris. When he returned to Sweden, in 1854, he painted altarpieces and restored frescoes in several major churches.

In 1858, he returned to the Royal Academy as an "agré" (a type of member candidate). From 1860, he taught figure drawing and painting at the Slöjdföreningens skola (Craft Association School), which is now called the Konstfack. He retired, with a pension, in 1881. From 1888 to 1889 he again became a traveler, visiting England, Scotland and Italy.

He continued to do restorative work while employed as a teacher. One notable project in 1870 involved the restoration of medieval limestone paintings at the 14th century Västeråker Church in Uppsala County. This made him part of a group of painters who were favored by King Karl XV. As a lithographer, he is best known for illustrating Frithiofs Saga, an epic poem by Esaias Tegnér. He also contributed drawings and text for the Ny Illustrerad Tidning, a popular weekly cultural journal.

He never married. He and his brother Lars Fredrik, a successful brewer and distiller, are buried together at the Norra begravningsplatsen near Stockholm.

His works may be seen, among other places, at the Nationalmuseum, Nordiska museet, Göteborgs konstmuseum and Livrustkammaren.
