= 1290s in architecture =

- 1280s
- 1290s in architecture
- 1300s
Other topics in 1290s:
- Art
- Music

== Buildings and structures ==
=== Buildings ===
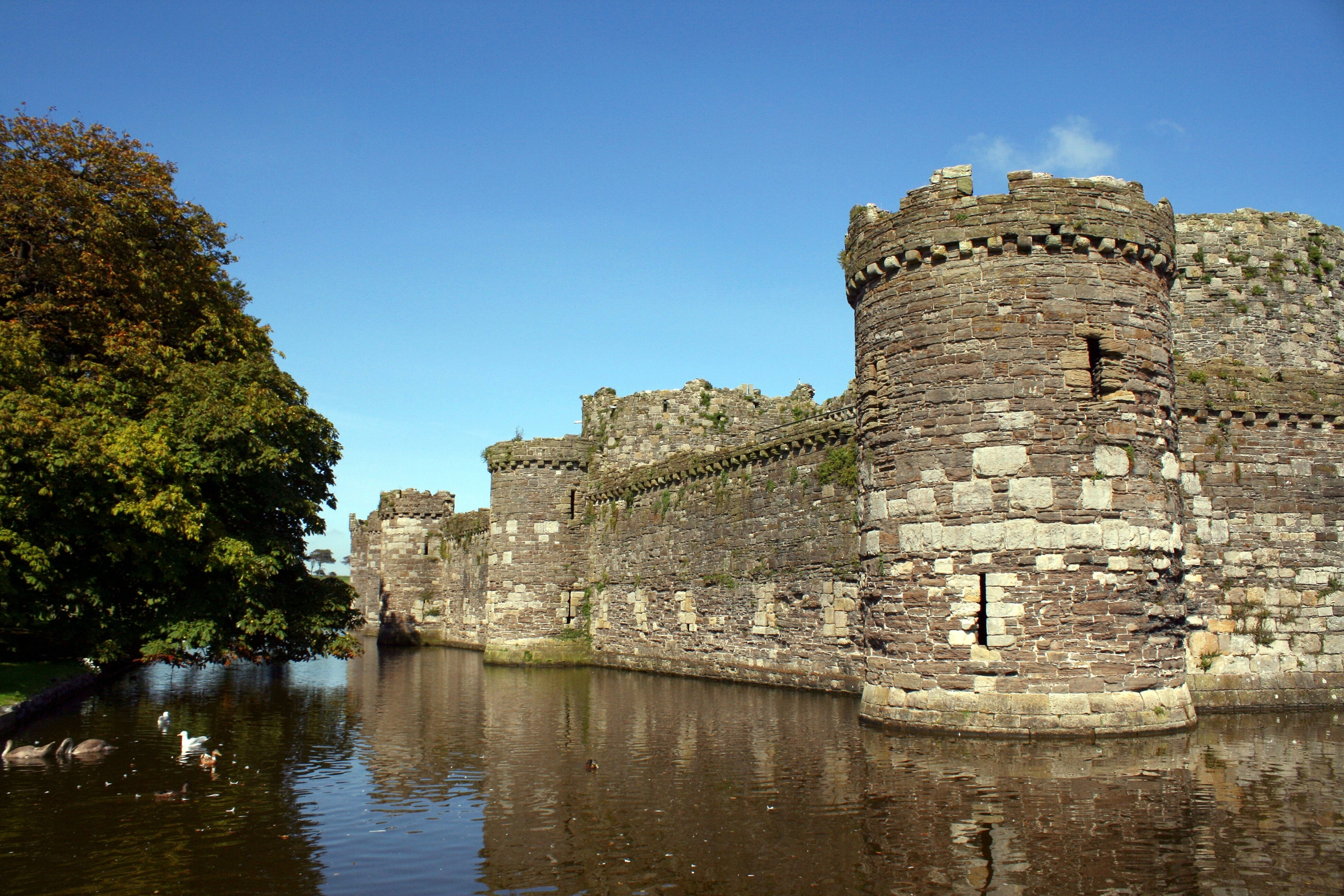
Beaumaris Castle on Anglesey in Wales

- c.1290–97 – Merton College Chapel (choir) in Oxford built
- 1290 – Orvieto Cathedral, Umbria by Arnolfo di Cambio begun
- 1292 – Great Coxwell Barn in England built
- 1293 – Hôpital de Notre-Dame de Fontenilles, Tonnerre, Burgundy, begun
- 1295 – Beaumaris Castle by Master James of Saint George on Anglesey in Wales begun
- 1296
  - Florence Cathedral (Il Duomo di Firenze) by Arnolfo di Cambio begun
  - Basilica of Santa Croce, Florence by Arnolfo di Cambio begun
- 1299 – Eşrefoğlu Mosque in Beyşehir, Anatolia, completed
