= 1270s in architecture =

The 1270s in architecture involved the following:

- 1260s
- 1270s in architecture
- 1280s
Other topics in 1270s:
- Art
- Music

Architecture timeline

== Buildings and structures ==
=== Buildings ===
- 1270 – Rebuilding of church of San Francesco de' Ferri in Pisa, Italy completed.
- c.1270 – Rebuilding of Old Synagogue (Erfurt) in Thuringia.
- 1272
  - April 13 – Rebuilding of Narbonne Cathedral, in France, in Gothique Méridional style begins.
  - Construction of Leaning Tower of Pisa resumes, after almost a century, under Giovanni di Simone, continuing through the decade.
  - Construction of Monnow Bridge at Monmouth in Wales begins (traditional date).
- 1273
  - Rebuilding of Regensburg Cathedral begins.
  - Palazzo Mozzi, an early Renaissance palace in Florence, Italy, is completed (begun in 1260).
- 1274 – Rebuilding of Coutances Cathedral, in France, in its current aspect is completed (begun in 1210).
- 1275 – Rebuilding of Reims Cathedral, in France, is completed (begun in 1211).
- 1276 – Consecration of Altenberger Dom choir.
- 1277
  - Hailes Abbey near Winchcombe, Gloucestershire, England, rebuilt.
  - St. Augustine's Monastery (Erfurt), Germany begun.
  - Construction of Arezzo Cathedral begins.
- 1279
  - White Dagoba (白塔), Dadu, located in the later Miaoying Temple (妙应寺) of Beijing, China, is completed (begun in 1271).
  - Ince Minaret Medrese at Konya in Turkey, completed.
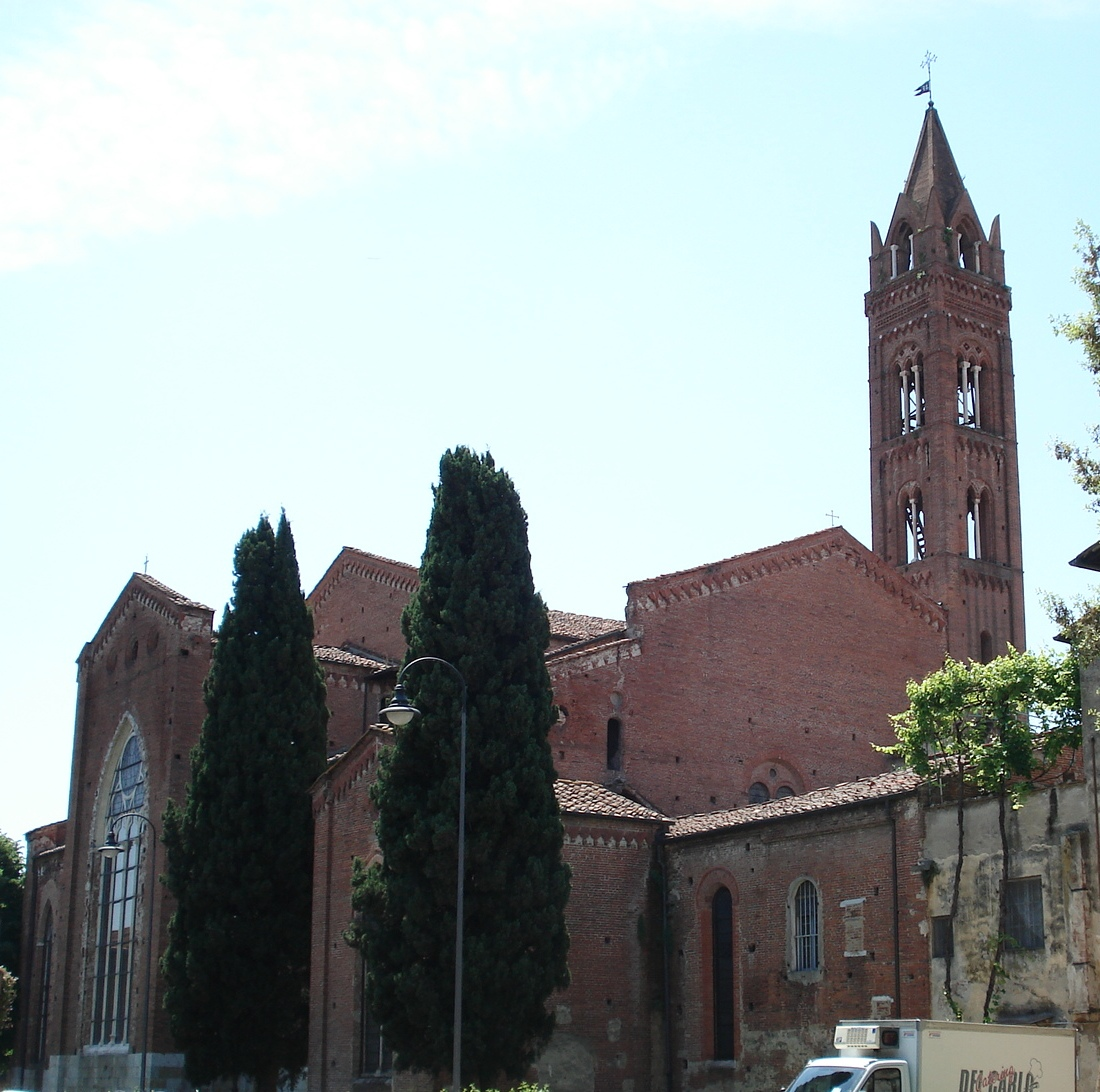
San Francesco de' Ferri, Pisa (1270)

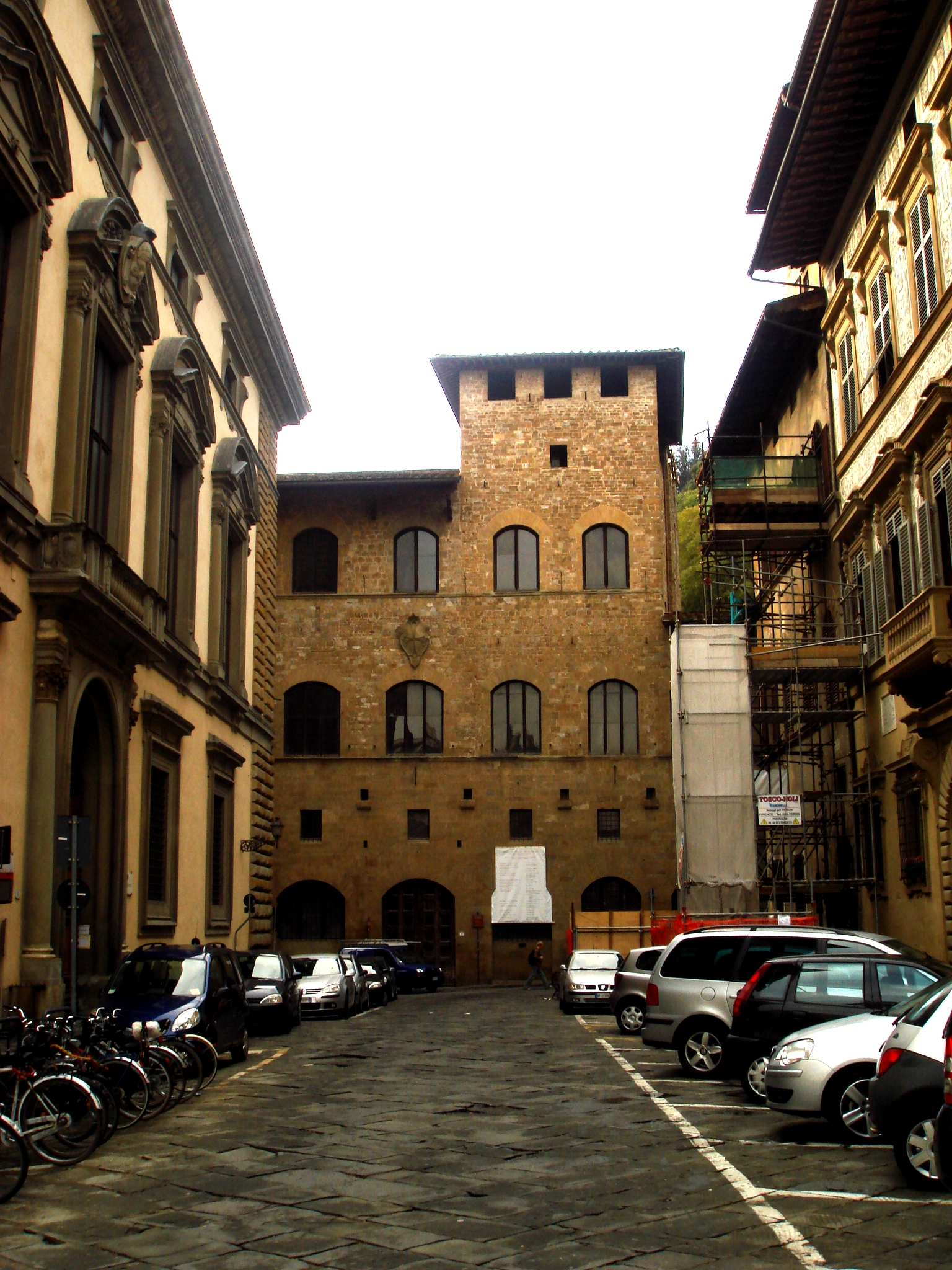
Palazzo Mozzi, Florence (1273)

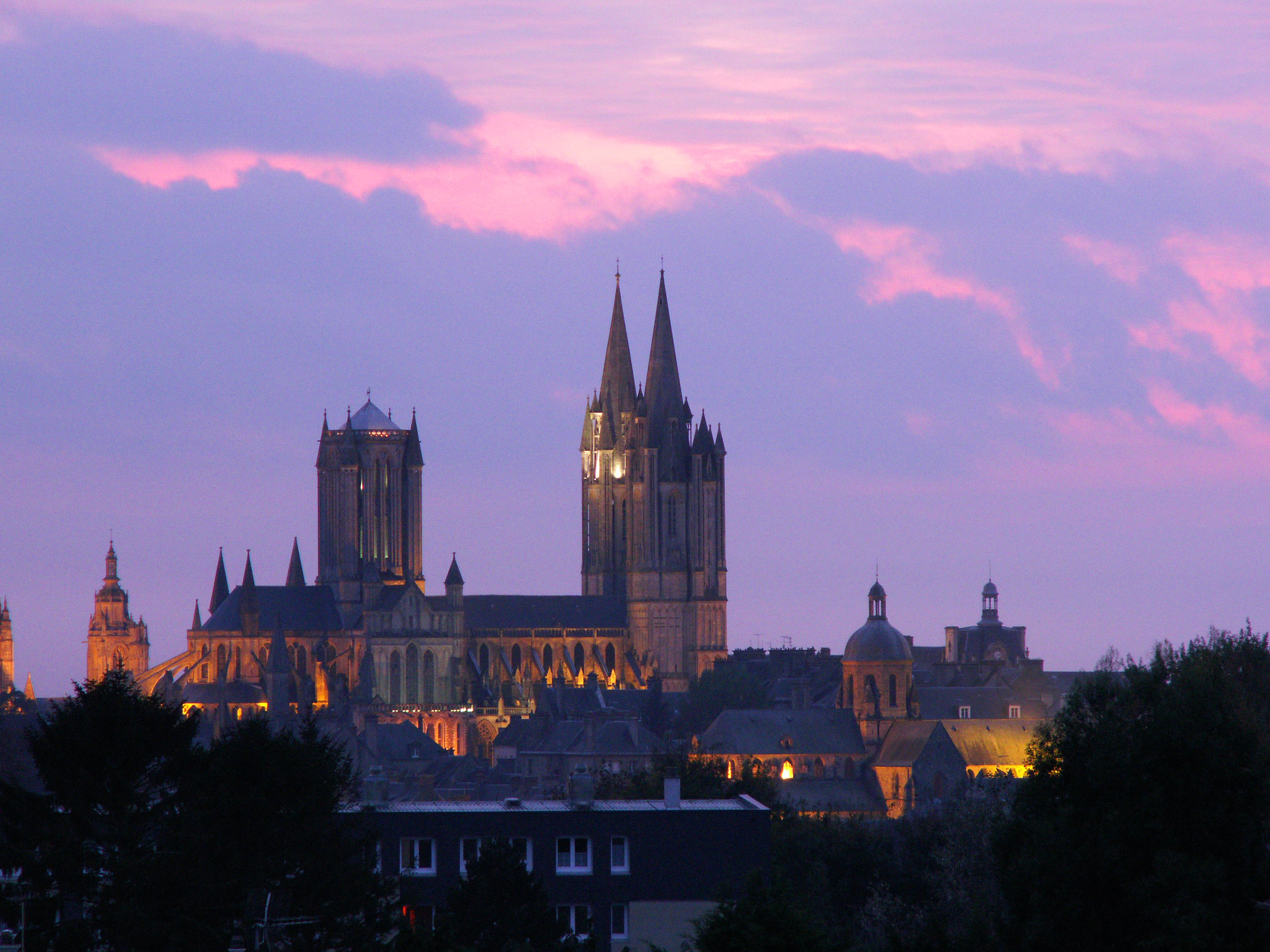
Coutances Cathedral (1274)

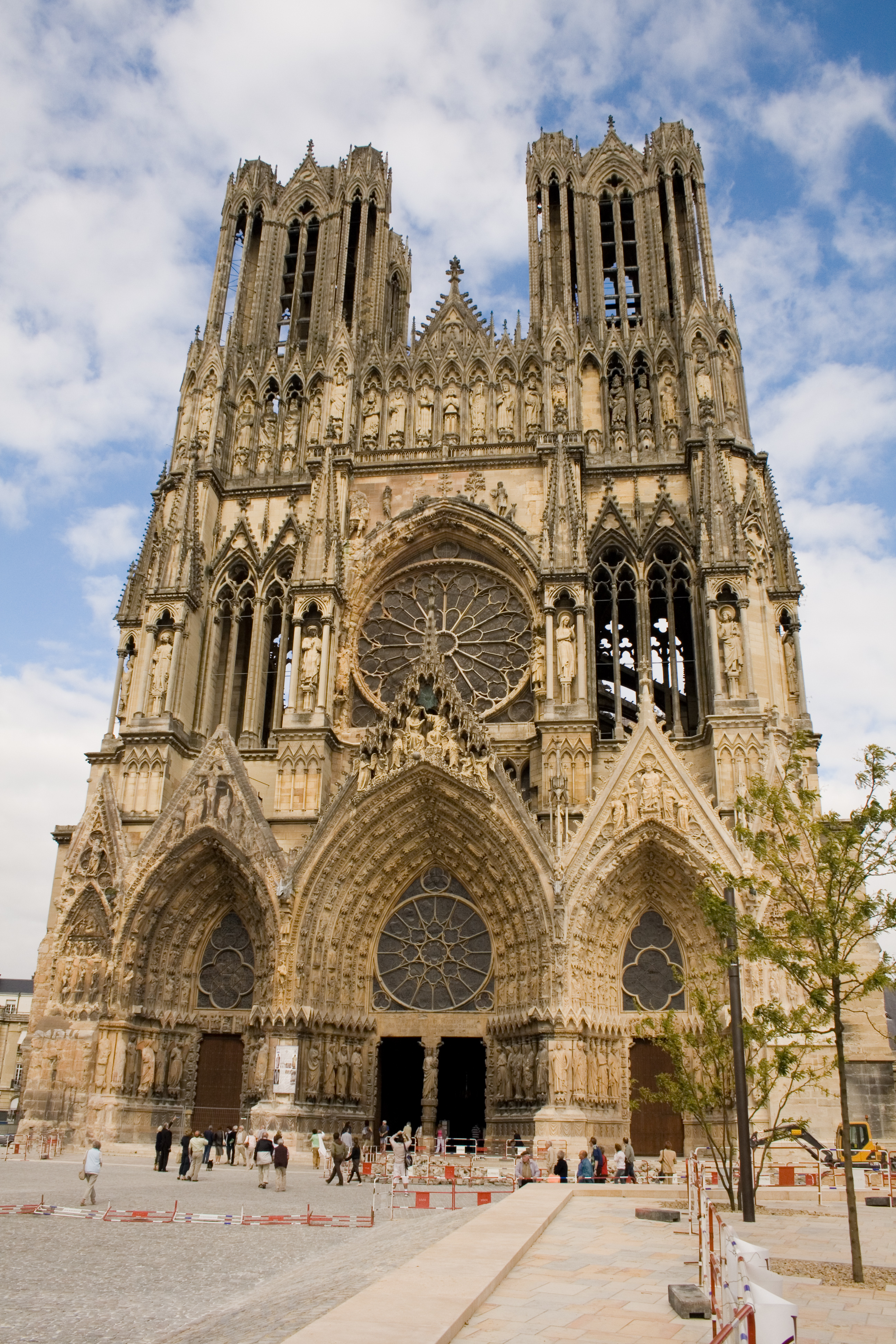
Reims Cathedral (1275)

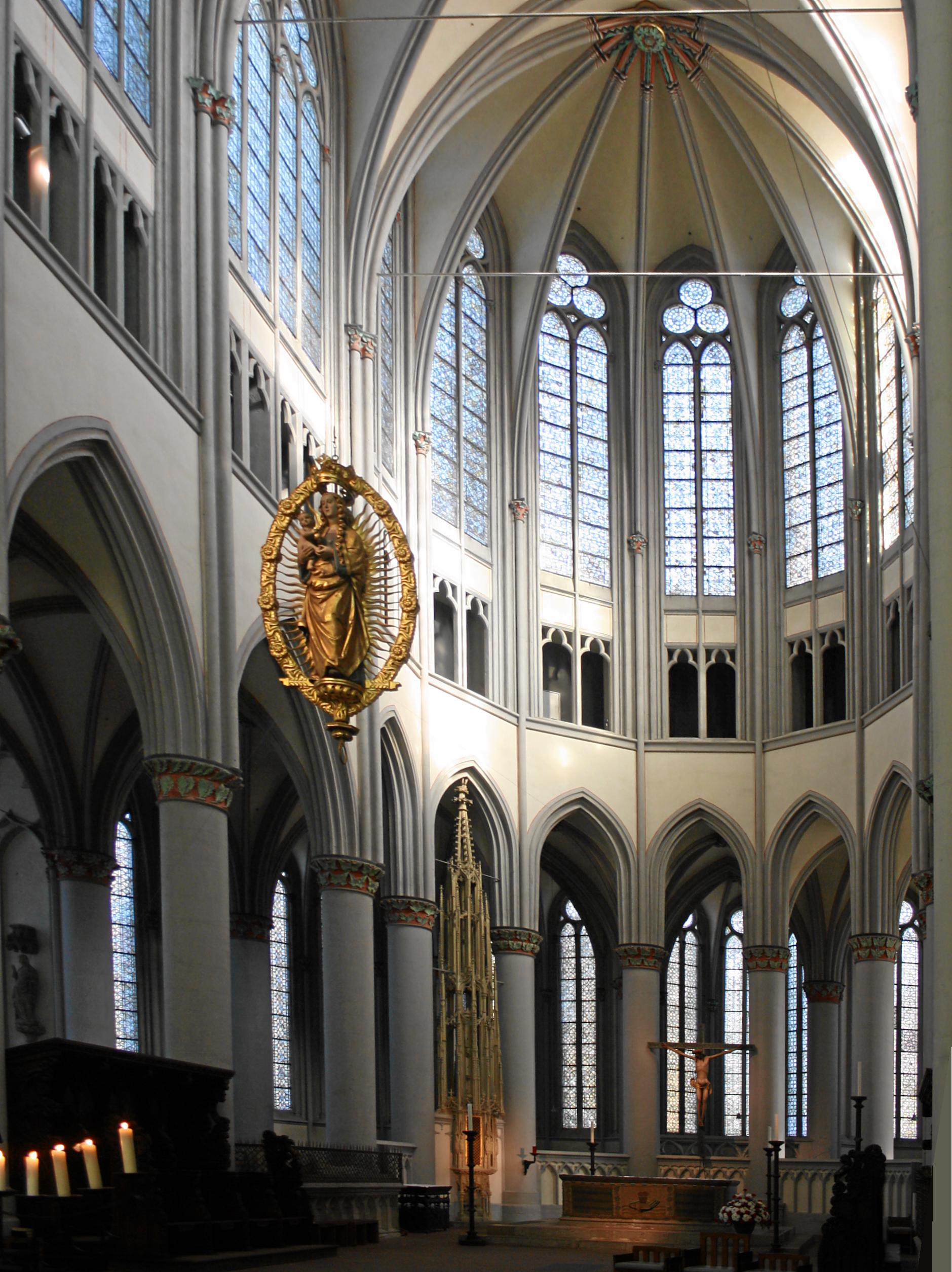
Altenberger Dom (1276)

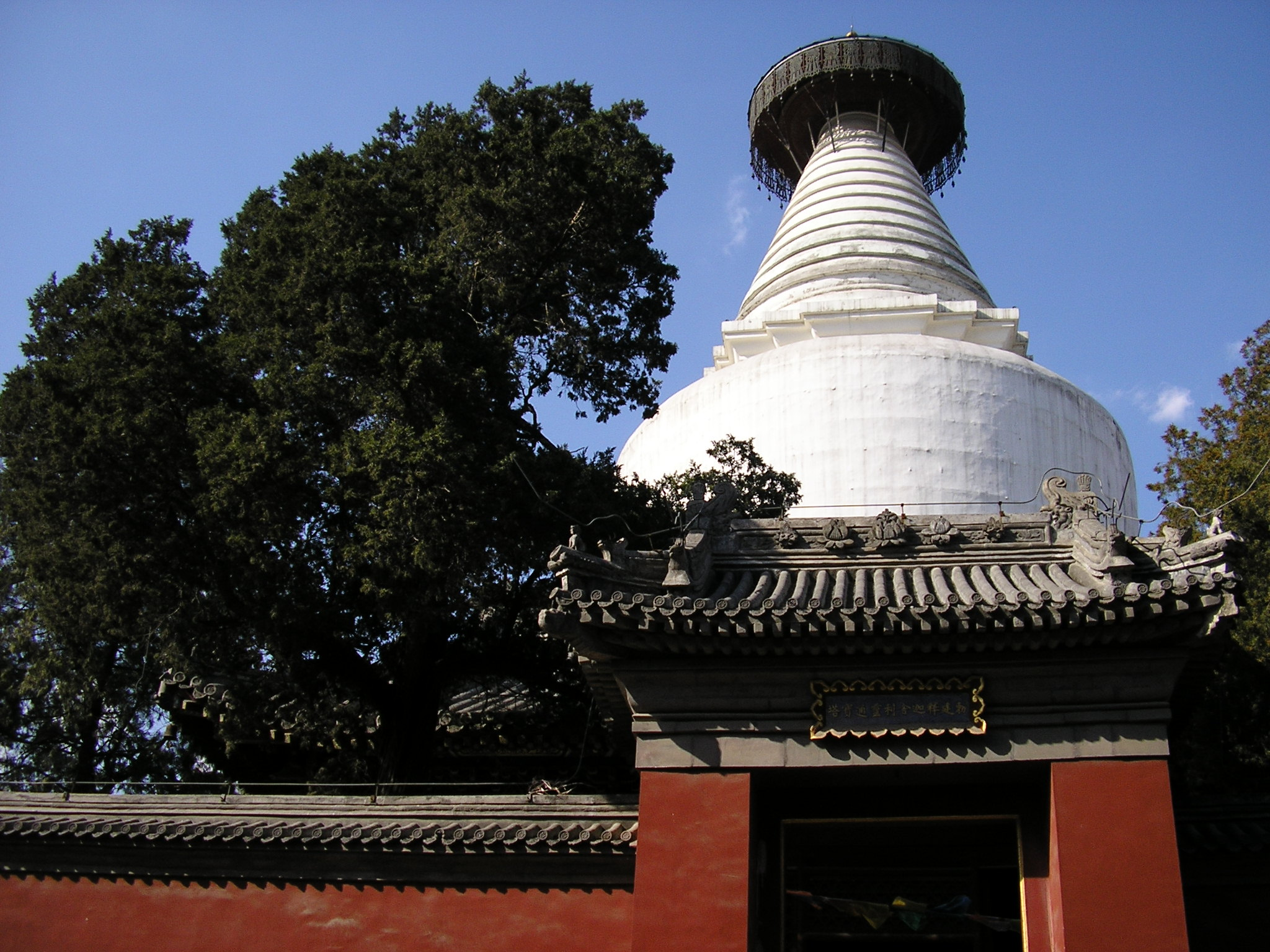
White Dagoba of Miaoying Temple (1279)
