= 1260s in architecture =

- 1250s
- 1260s in architecture
- 1270s
Other topics in 1260s:
- Art
- Music

Architecture timeline

== Buildings and structures ==
=== Buildings ===
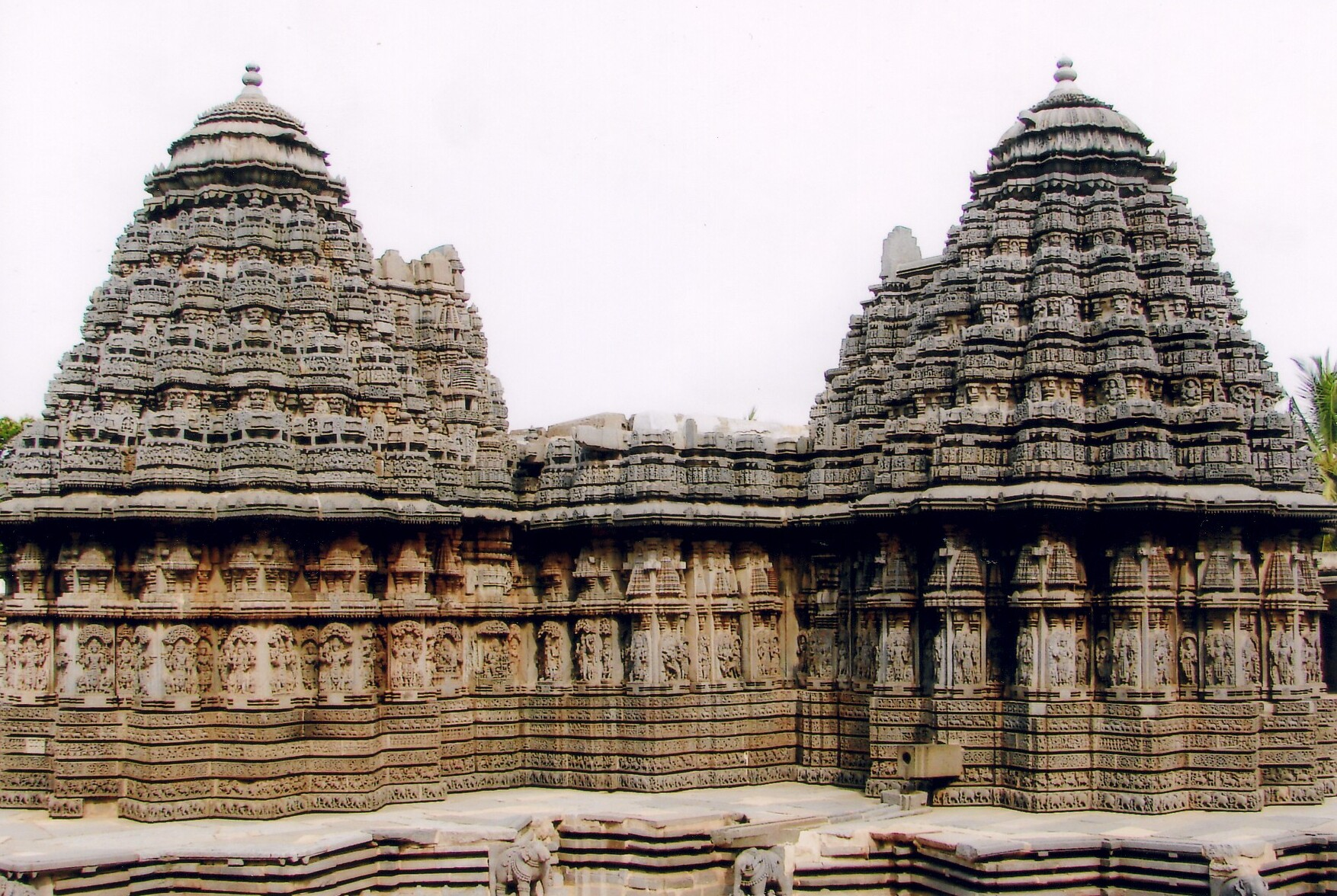
Chennakesava Temple, Somanathapura (1268)

- 1260
  - Chartres Cathedral consecrated.
  - Grey Abbey, Kildare
- 1261
  - St German's Priory Church, Cornwall, consecrated.
  - Rebuilding of San Francesco, Pisa in Italy begun.
- c. 1262 – Église Saint-Urbain, Troyes, France, begun; choir and transepts completed 1266.
- 1263
  - Romanesque St. Stephen's Cathedral, Vienna, consecrated.
  - Siena Cathedral completed (dome 1264).
- 1268 – Chennakesava Temple at Somanathapura in India (Hoysala Empire) built.
- 1269 – Fakr ad-Din Mosque in the Sultanate of Mogadishu

== Births ==
- c. 1267 – Giotto, Florentine painter and architect (died 1337)
