= 1280s in architecture =

- 1270s
- 1280s in architecture
- 1290s
Other topics in 1280s:
- Art
- Music

Architecture timeline

== Buildings and structures ==
=== Buildings ===
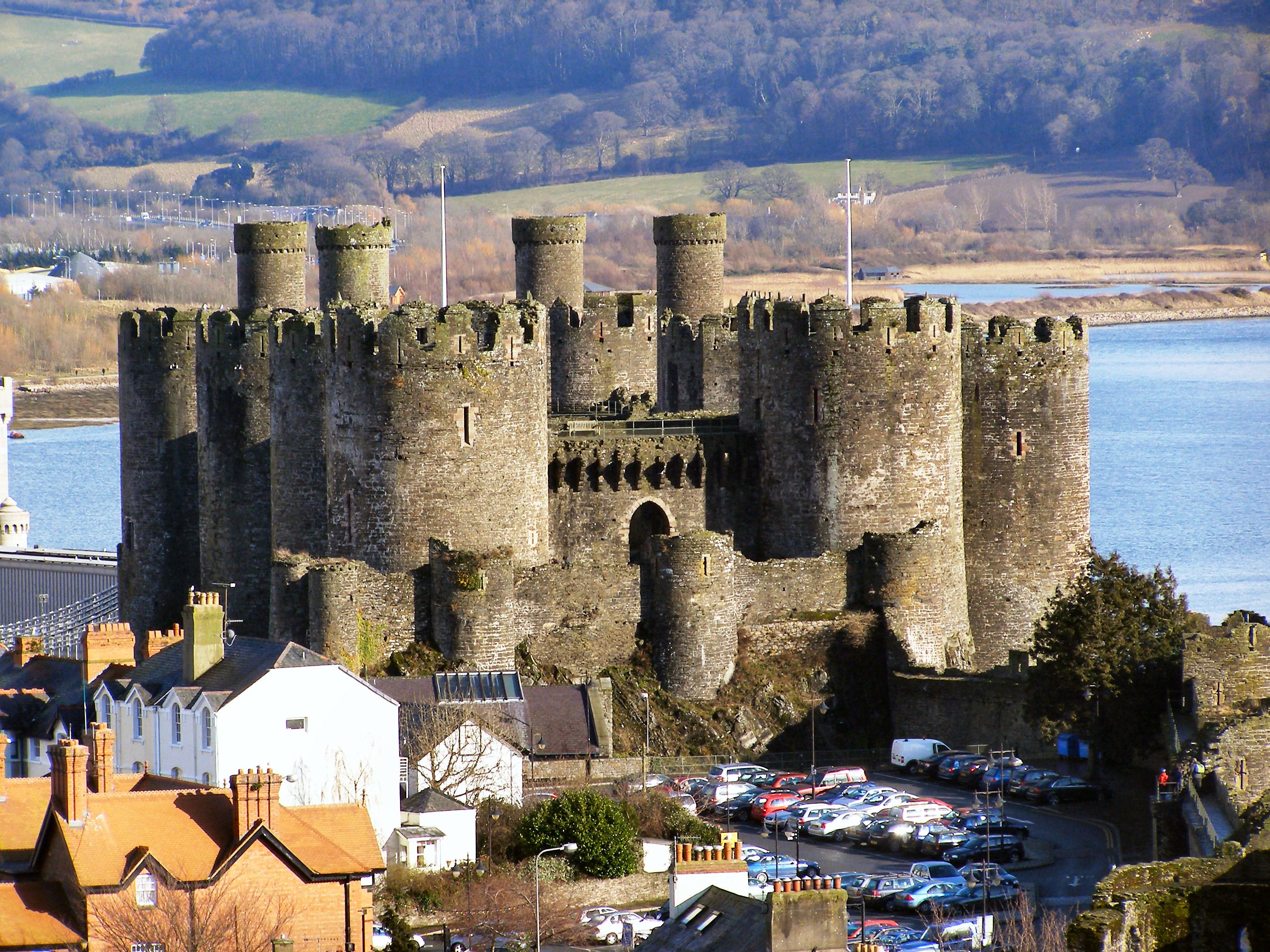
Conwy Castle

- 1280
  - The Piazza del Campo at Siena, Italy is begun (completed in 1350).
  - Durham Cathedral (in Durham, England) is completed (begun in 1093).
  - The second Doorwerth Castle, rebuilt of stone, on the Rhine near Arnhem, is again besieged, and this time the bailey is burned down.
  - At the site of present-day Sheffield Cathedral in England, a second parish church is completed, but is mostly demolished and rebuilt about 1430 on a cruciform floor plan.
  - Spire of St Wulfram's Church, Grantham, England, is begun.
  - Cressing Temple Wheat Barn in eastern England erected by about this date.
- 1281 – The Basilica de Sant Francesc is built in Palma, Majorca, on a site where the Moors made soap.
- 1282
  - In Naples, Italy, original construction of Castel Nuovo (Italian: "New Castle") is completed (begun in 1279); it has been expanded or renovated several times since.
  - Albi Cathedral in Languedoc is begun.
- 1283 – Construction of Caernarfon, Conwy and Harlech Castles in Gwynedd, North Wales, is begun by King Edward I of England.
- 1284 – Construction of Beauvais Cathedral is interrupted by a partial collapse of the choir.
- 1285 – Regensburg Cathedral is redesigned in Gothic style.
- 1289
  - Construction of Conwy Castle, ordered by King Edward I of England, is completed in North Wales.
  - Construction of the Belaya Vezha tower in Belarus is completed.
  - Dedication of Santa Maria di Collemaggio on the edge of L'Aquila.
  - Pope Nicholas IV formally constitutes the University of Montpellier in France by papal bull, combining various existing schools under the mantle of a single university.

== Births ==
- c. 1285 – Agostino da Siena, Italian architect and sculptor (died c. 1347)
