= Västeråker Church =

Coordinates: 59°45′09″N 17°30′38″E

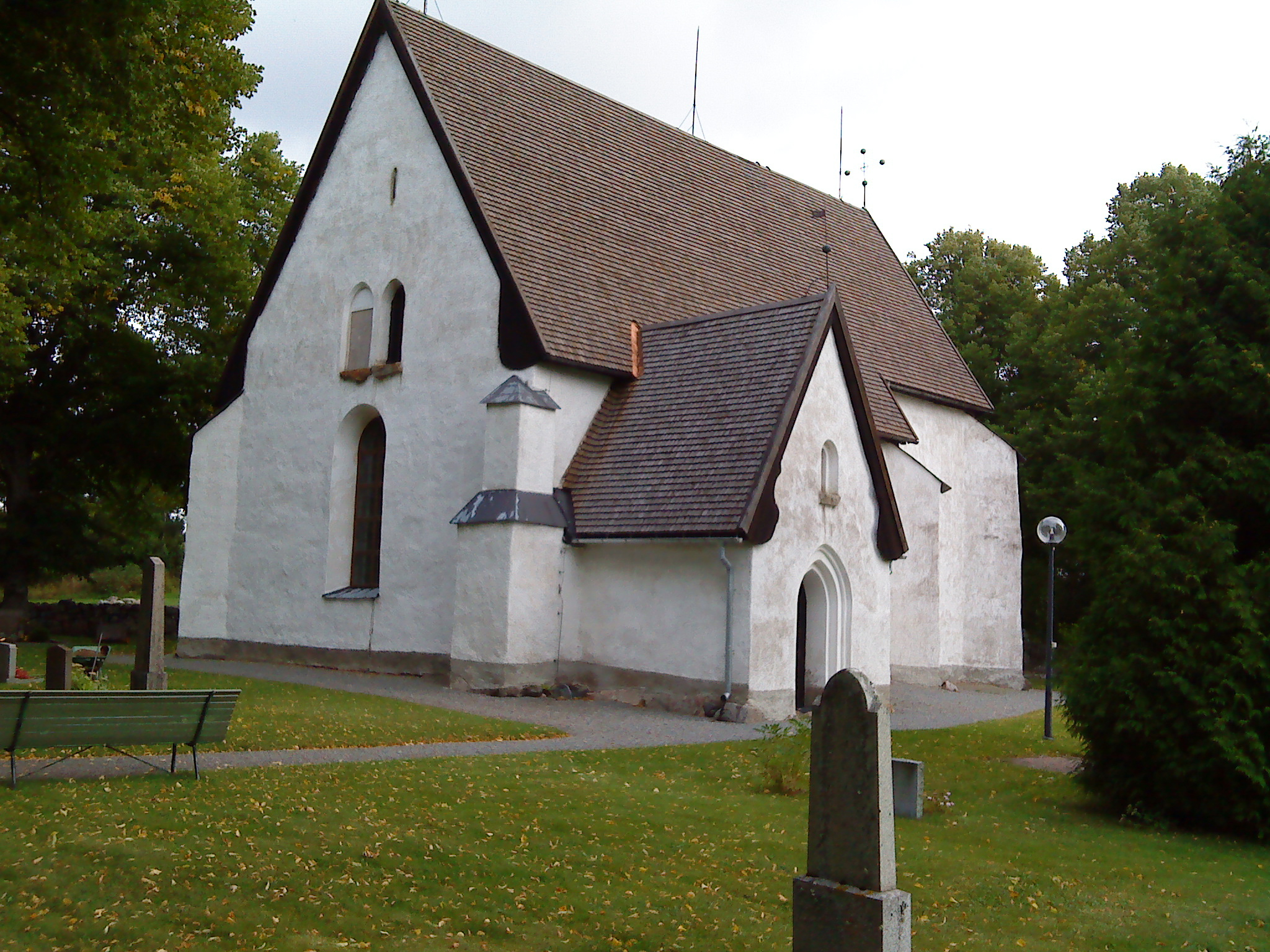
Västeråker Church, external view

Västeråker Church (Swedish: Västeråkers kyrka) is a Lutheran church in the Archdiocese of Uppsala in Uppsala County, Sweden.

== History and architecture ==
The church was built in 1331 and commissioned by Ramborg Israelsdotter (And), lady of nearby Vik Castle. The church is almost unchanged since its construction. It is one of the most lavish churches in Sweden from this period. There may have been an earlier church on the same site. The church is a single-aisled, rectangular building with a slightly narrower choir with a porch to the south and a sacristy to the north. The building is supported by buttresses in the corners. The brick vaults in nave and choir are original, a rarity in a Swedish country church at that time.

The windows were enlarged in 1829. A notable item in the church is a grave monument, made in copper, over lady Ramborg. It displays a portrait of the lady and a warning that anyone who attempts to steal the precious monument will suffer the wrath of God. A major restoration of the church's limestone paintings was undertaken in 1870 by the Swedish artist, Johan Zacharias Blackstadius.

== See also ==
- Vik Castle
