= Tongji Bridge (Yi County) =

Tongji Bridge 通济桥
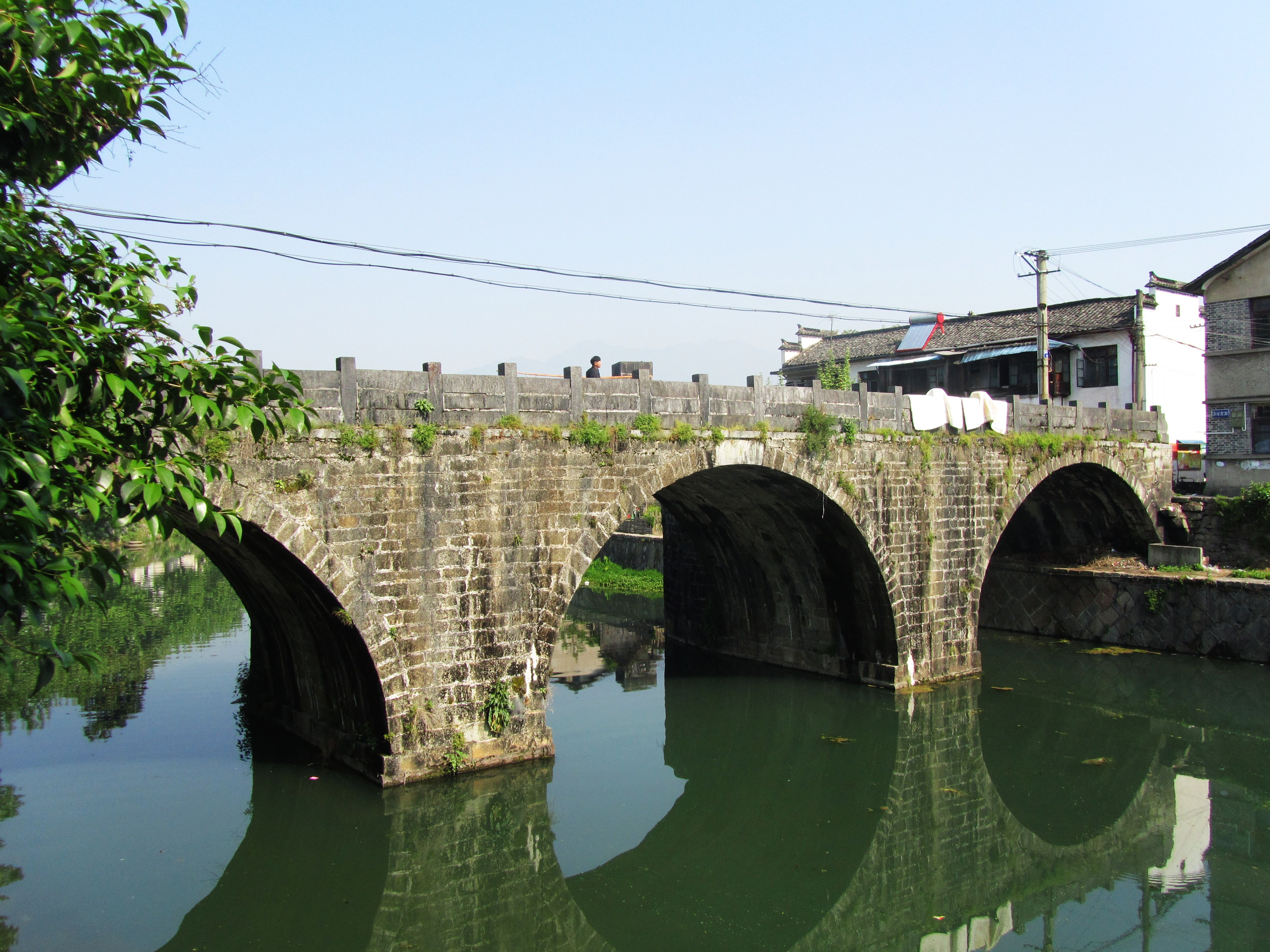
- Tongji Bridge in April 2013
- Coordinates: 29°56′04″N 117°56′48″E
- Carries: Pedestrians
- Crosses: Zhang River
- Locale: Biyang, Yi County, Anhui, China

Characteristics
- Design: Arch bridge
- Material: Stone
- Total length: 32 metres (105 ft)
- Width: 6.5 metres (21 ft)
- Height: 10 metres (33 ft)

History
- Construction end: 1178
- Rebuilt: 1754

Location
- Interactive map of Tongji Bridge

The Tongji Bridge (simplified Chinese: 通济桥; traditional Chinese: 通濟橋; pinyin: Tōngjì Qiáo), commonly known as North Gate Bridge (北门桥; 北門橋; Běimén Qiáo), is a historic stone arch bridge over the Zhang River in the town of Biyang, Yi County, Anhui, China. The bridge measures 32 metres (105 ft) long, 6.5 metres (21 ft) wide, and approximately 10 metres (33 ft) high.

== History ==
The original bridge dates back to 1178, during the Chunxi period of the Southern Song dynasty (1127–1279), and rebuilt in 1541, during the ruling of Jiajing Emperor of the Ming dynasty (1368–1644). In the 19th year of Qianlong period (1754) of the Qing dynasty (1644–1911), it was rebuilt again and changed to its current name. It was renovated and refurbished in 1883 and 1982, respectively.
