= Alan of Walsingham =

English architect and prior

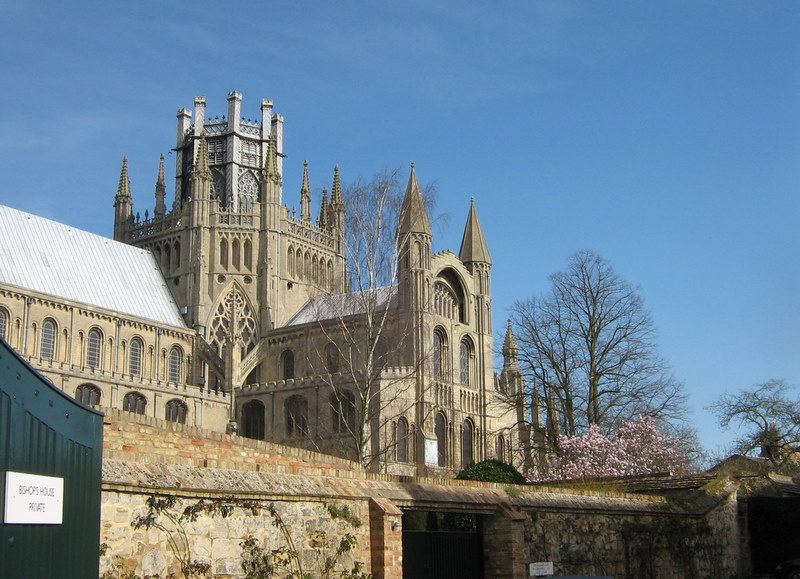
Alan of Walsingham's unique octagonal lantern at Ely Cathedral.

Alan of Walsingham (died c. 1364), also known as Alan de Walsingham, was an English architect, first heard of in 1314 as a junior monk at Ely, distinguished by his skill in goldsmith's work, and for his acquaintance with the principles of mechanics.

He afterwards turned his attention to the study of architecture, and in 1321, when sub-prior of his convent, designed and began to build St Mary's Chapel (now Trinity Church), attached to the cathedral of Ely. At the same time he was engaged in the erection of Prior Crauden's Chapel, the new sacristy, and many minor works. In December 1321, he was elected sacristan, with sole charge of the fabric of the cathedral.

Early on the morning of 13 February 1322, the great tower of the Ely Cathedral fell, and destroyed the choir and other attached portions of the structure. Instead of rebuilding the four piers, which carried the Norman (square) tower, a weak point in cathedral construction, Alan advanced the supports, to the extent of one bay, into each arm of the cross; and by so doing he not only distributed the weight upon eight piers instead of four, but obtained a magnificent central octagonal hall, which he roofed with a dome surmounted by a tall lantern. The result was not only very beautiful, but also very original. It is almost certain that Alan never travelled beyond the limits of his convent, and that he was not acquainted, except perhaps from hearsay, with the domed Churches of the East, whose principles of construction, moreover, differ essentially from those employed by Alan. His work remains to this day unique among the cathedrals of Europe. He subsequently rebuilt the bays of the choir, which had been ruined by the fall of the great tower, and these are admittedly amongst the most beautiful examples of Decorated, or Second Pointed, English Gothic architecture.

In 1341, Alan of Walsingham was elected Prior of Ely, and in 1344 to the bishopric of Ely, rendered vacant by the death of Simon de Montacute. When he thus became bishop-elect, the works connected with the fabric of the cathedral had been conducted to a successful termination, leaving for his successor only the decorations and fittings.

His election, however, was set aside by the Pope in favour of Thomas L'Isle, a Dominican friar, who was at Avignon with the Pope at the time. A similar honor was destined for Alan in 1361, but the choice of the convent was again overruled, and Simon Langham, afterwards Archbishop of Canterbury and Cardinal, was consecrated Bishop of Ely in his stead. The possessions of the convent were said to have increased under his administration.

== Gallery of Ely Cathedral ==
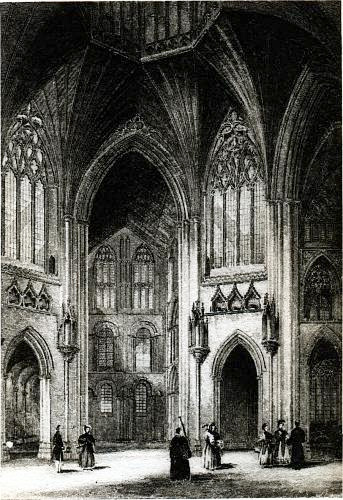
The Octagon

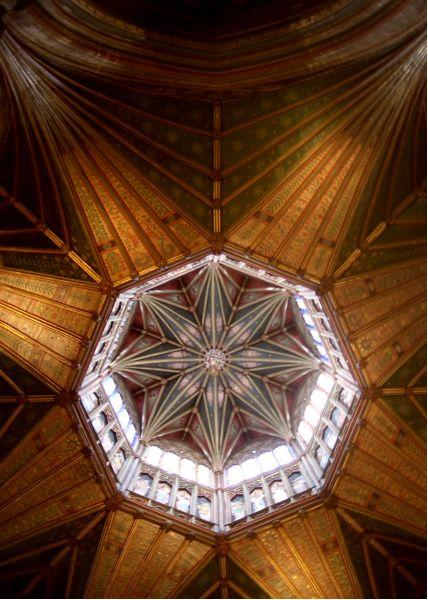
Vaulting of Octagon

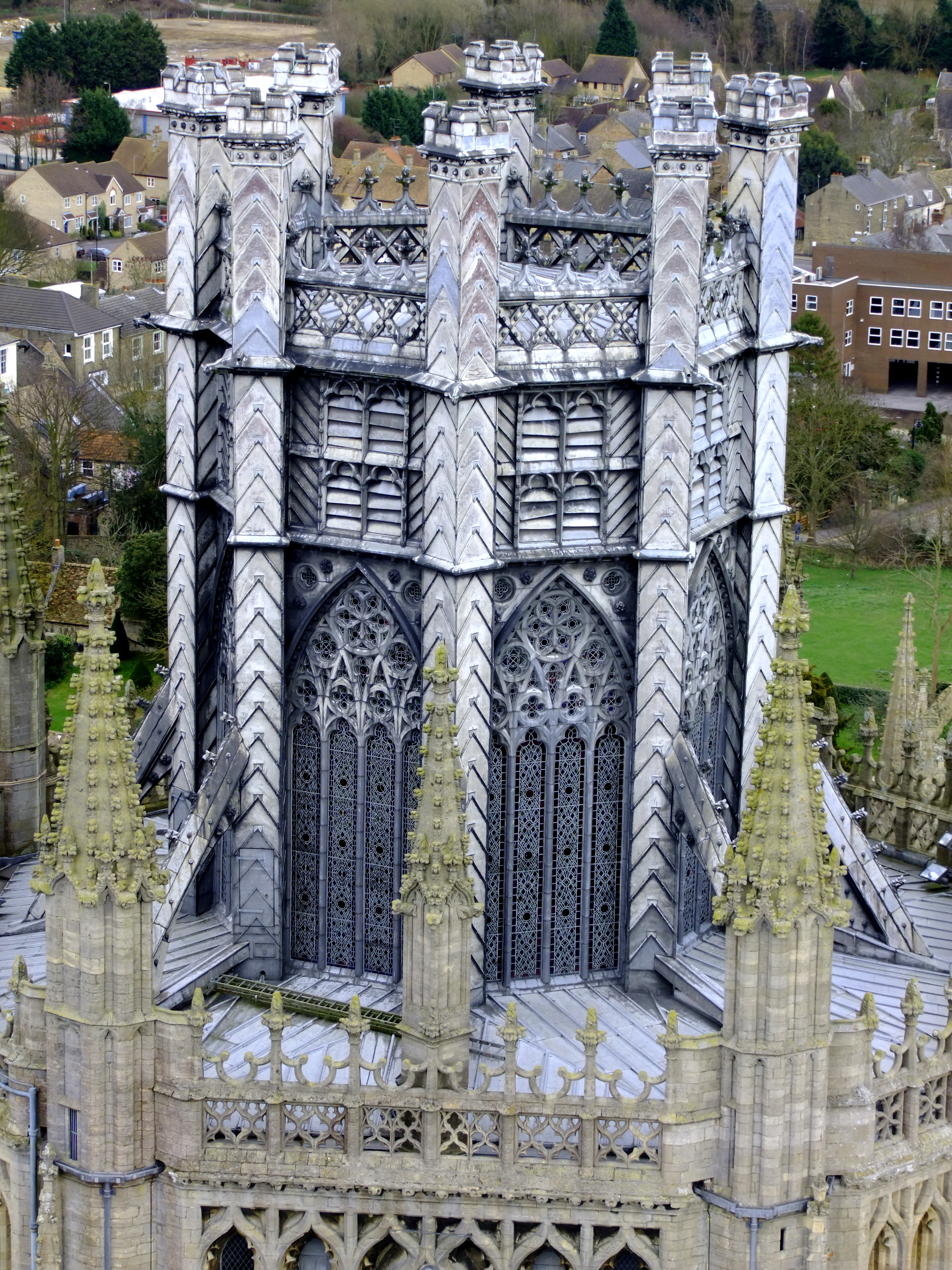
The Lantern of the Octagon

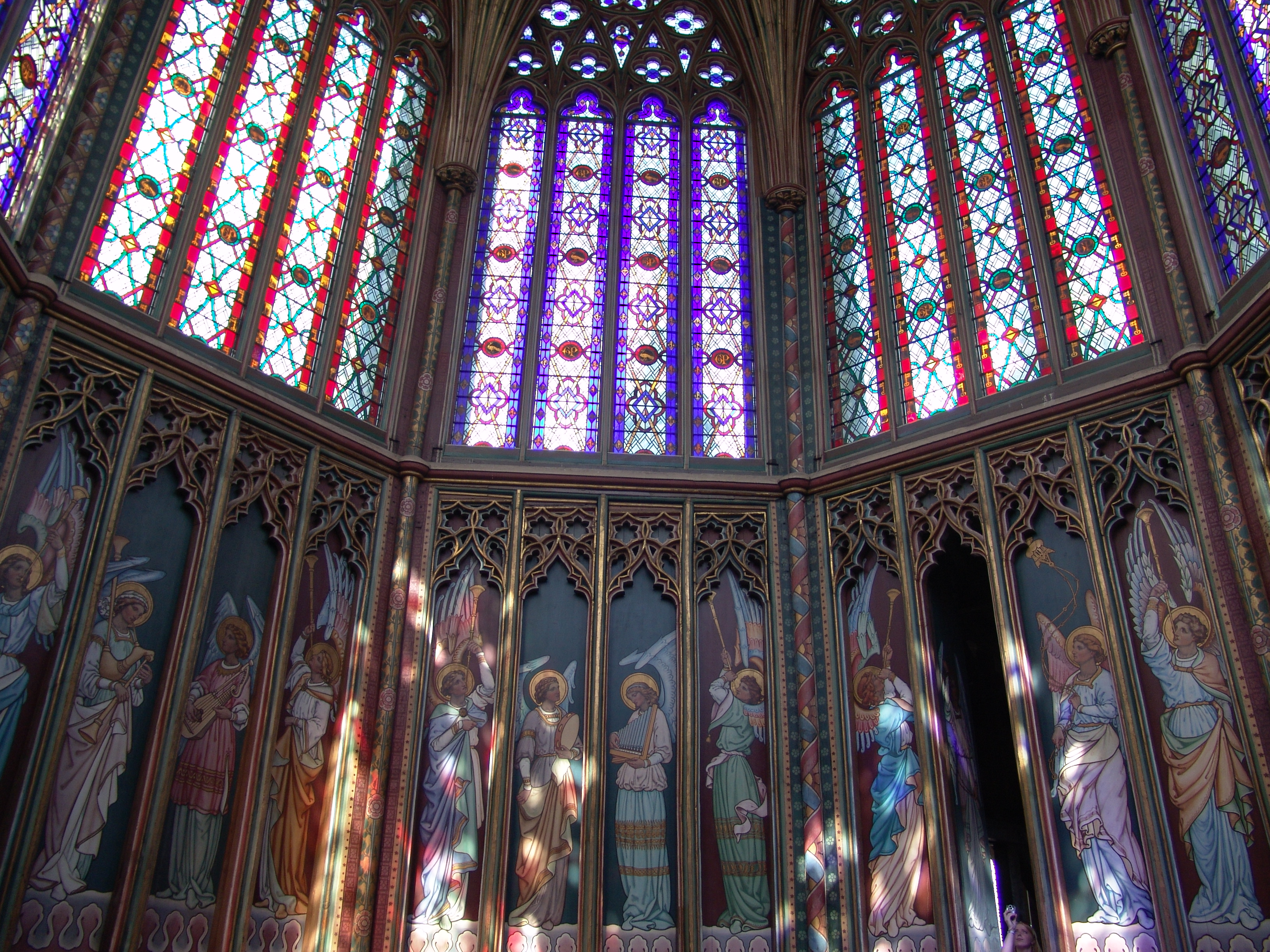
Interior of the Lantern of the Octagon

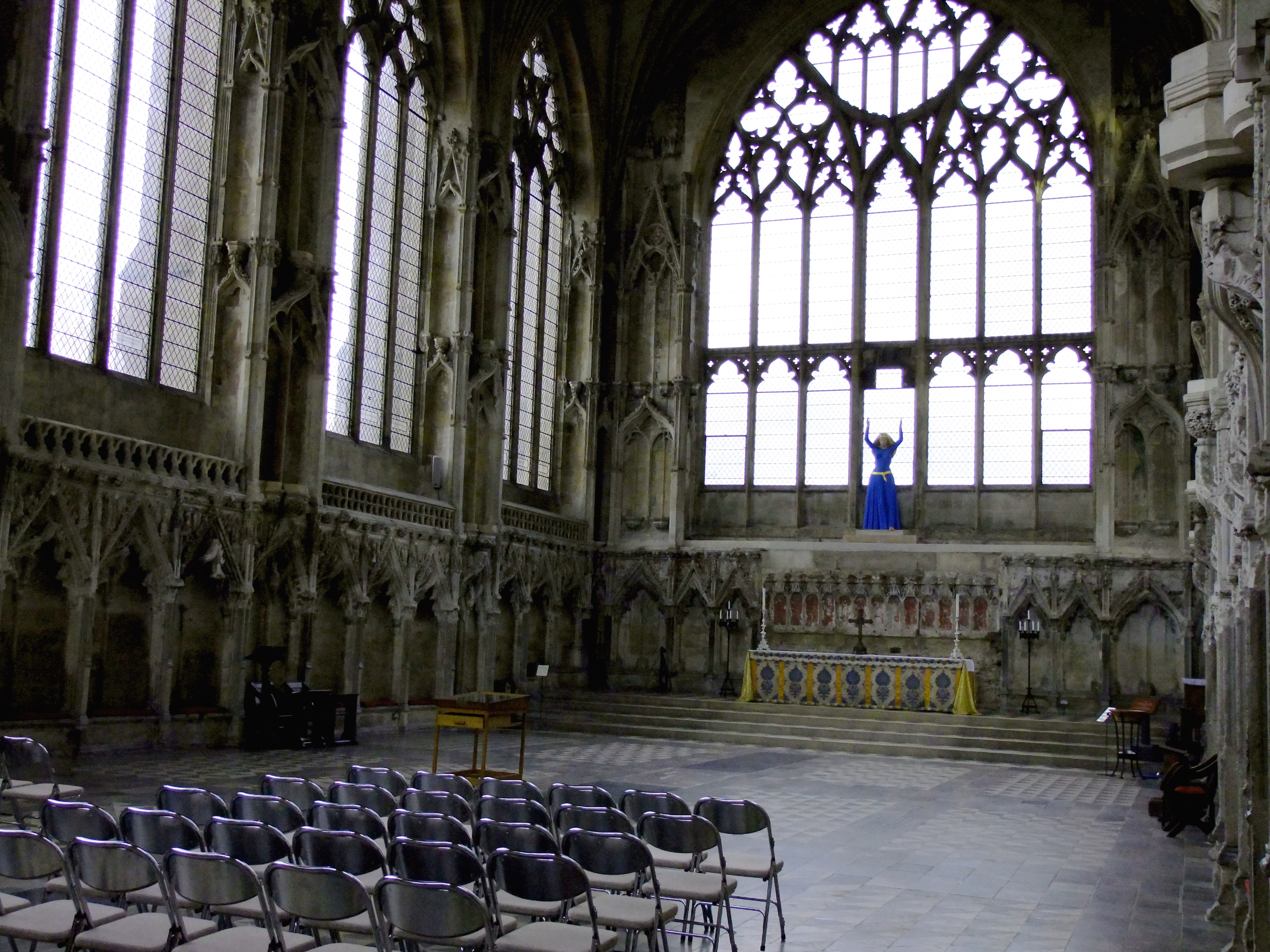
St. Mary's Chapel (The Lady Chapel)

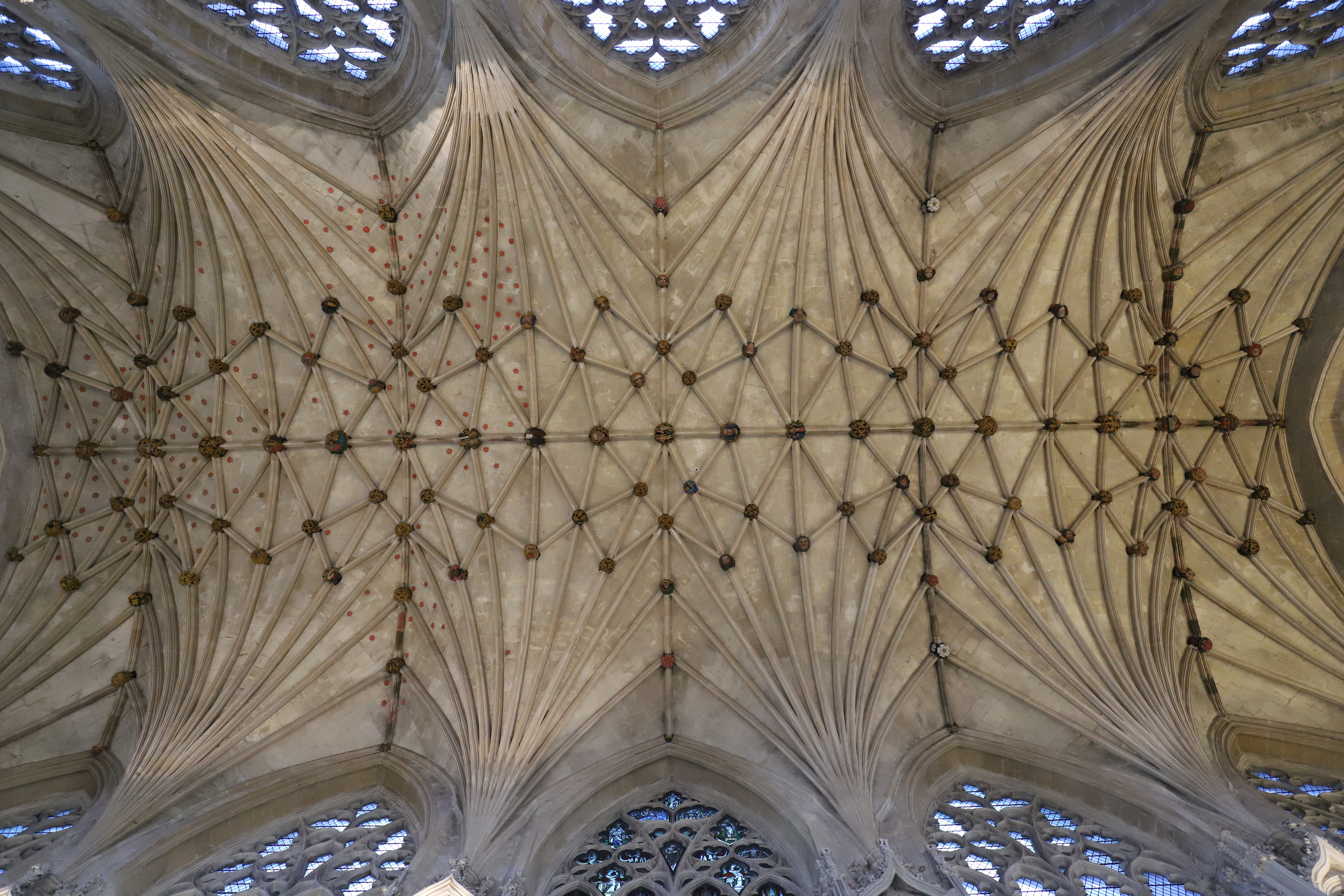
Vaulting, St. Mary's Chapel (The Lady Chapel)
