= Tongji Bridge (Yuyao) =

Tongji Bridge 通济桥/通濟橋
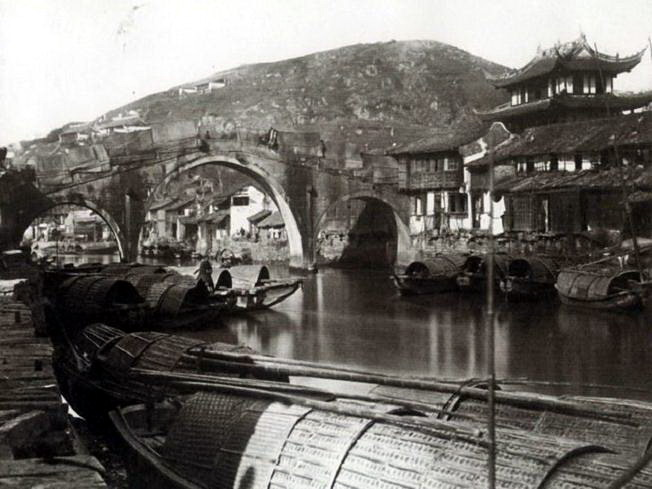
- Tongji Bridge and the Shunjiang Building in 1930s
- Coordinates: 30°02′57″N 121°09′11″E
- Crosses: Yao River
- Locale: Yuyao, Zhejiang, China

Characteristics
- Design: Arch bridge
- Height: 6 m (20 ft)
- Longest span: 14.2 m (47 ft)
- No. of spans: 3

History
- Construction start: Song dynasty (wooden); Yuan dynasty (stone); Qing dynasty (repair)
- Construction end: 1048; 1332; 1731

The Tongji Bridge (simplified Chinese: 通济桥; traditional Chinese: 通濟橋; pinyin: Tōng Jì Qiáo), is a famous stone arch bridge located in Yuyao, Zhejiang, China. "Tongji Bridge" ("Tong" means transport/transportation, "Ji" means aid or to cross a river) is a very common name for bridges in ancient China.

== History ==
The bridge has a very long history. It is the first large-sized arch bridge in the Eastern Zhejiang region, so it's also called the First Bridge of Eastern Zhe (浙东第一桥; 浙東第一橋; Zhè Dōng Dì Yī Qiáo); "Zhe" is the short name for Zhejiang Province).

The construction of the bridge started first during the Qingli era (1041–1048; 庆历; 慶曆; Qìng Lì) of the Northern Song dynasty, and it was wooden structure. Its original name was Dehui Bridge (德惠桥; 德惠橋; Dé Huì Qiáo). And its name later was changed to Hong Bridge (虹桥; 虹橋; Hóng Qiáo; "Hong" means rainbow). It was destroyed in wars and reconstructed for several times.

In Yuan dynasty, a Buddhist monk named Huixing (惠兴; 惠興; Huì Xīng) started rebuilding the bridge using rocks, but he died when the construction was half-finished. Then a Taoist named Li Daoning (李道宁; 李道寧; Lǐ Dào Níng) continued his unfinished work. In the third year (year 1332) of the Zhishun era (至顺; 至順; Zhì Shùn) of the Yuan dynasty, the bridge was finally finished, and was renamed as "Tongji Bridge". There was a stone tablet aside the bridge, and there were eight characters on the stele – Hai Bo Guo er Feng Fan bu Xie (海舶过而风帆不解; 海舶過而風帆不解; Hǎi Bó Guò ér Fēng Fān bú Jiě), which means ships can go through the bridge's arch without any obstacles.

From the 7th to the 9th Year (1729–1731) of the Yongzheng era in Qing dynasty, the local government repaired and rebuilt most part of the bridge again, and that's the bridge nowadays looks like.

== Present ==
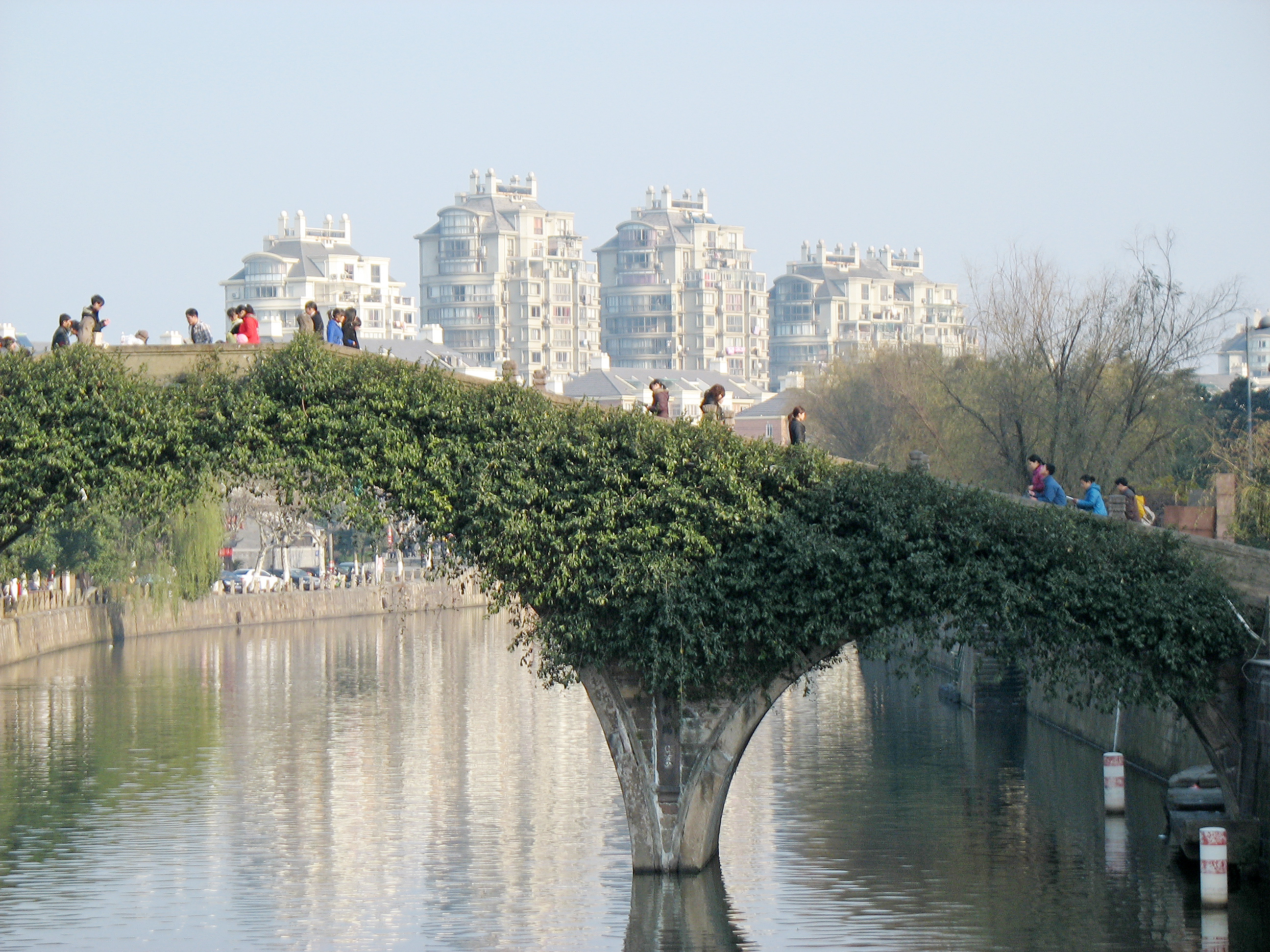
Tongji Bridge in 2009

The bridge nowadays is still in use and has busy traffic every day. The bridge has three spans, with the central/main span the largest one, and the rest two are equal. The main span is 14.2 meters. The total length of the bridge is about 50 meters. It has 106 steps.

In front of the bridge, it was the old city gate of Yuyao, which is also an ancient structure which is named Shunjiang Building (舜江楼; 舜江樓; Shùn Jiāng lóu). The bridge and the old city gate together now are the key cultural relic under the city's protection.

== See also ==
- Tongji Bridge: a Tongji Bridge located in Jinhua, Zhejiang Province.
- Arch bridge
