= Tongji Bridge (Jinhua) =

Tongji Bridge 通濟橋
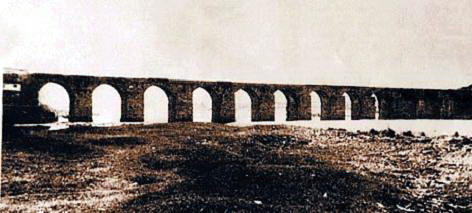
- Tongji Bridge during the late Qing Dynasty
- Coordinates: 29°06′N 119°39′E
- Crosses: Wu River
- Locale: Wucheng District, Jinhua, Zhejiang, China

Characteristics
- Design: Arch bridge
- Total length: 213 m (699 ft) (1809); 380 m (1,247 ft) (present)
- Width: 7 m (23 ft) (1809); 14.5 m (48 ft) (present)
- No. of spans: 13

History
- Construction start: Yuan Dynasty
- Construction end: 1334 (covered bridge); 1809 (changed to open bridge)
- Opened: 1334; 1809

Location
- Interactive map of Tongji Bridge 通濟橋

The Tongji Bridge (simplified Chinese: 通济桥; traditional Chinese: 通濟橋; pinyin: Tōngjì Qiáo) in Wucheng District, Jinhua, Zhejiang, China, is a large stone arch bridge.

"Tongji Bridge" ("Tong" means transport/transportantion, "Ji" means aid or cross a river) is a very common name for bridges in ancient China.

The bridge has a nickname "The Big Bridge of Jinhua" (traditional Chinese: 金華大橋, simplified Chinese: 金华大桥, pinyin: Jīn Huá Dà Qiáo), because of its large size. And it is one of the largest ancient arch bridges in Zhejiang.

The bridge goes across the Wu River (婺江), and has a total history of more than 600 years.

== History ==
The bridge has a long history. At beginning it was a wooden pontoon bridge. However, the bridge was often destroyed by floods during rain seasons.

In the fourth year of Dade (traditional/simplified Chinese: 大德, pinyin: Dà Dé) Era in Yuan Dynasty, a Buddhism monk named Ji'an (traditional/simplified Chinese: 及庵, pinyin: Jí'ān) from Xifeng Temple (traditional/simplified Chinese: 西峰寺, pinyin: Xī Fēng Sì) in suburban Jinhua suggested building a stone bridge, and he also help raise funds for the construction.

The first phase of construction lasted for five and a half years until the death of Ji'an. Eleven stone piers of the bridge were finished but the construction of its upper structure was stopped due to the death of Ji'an.

After many years, another monk, from the same temple, named Yunlong (traditional Chinese: 雲龍, simplified Chinese: 云龙, pinyin: Yúnlóng) who was the head of the temple at that time, came and continued Ji'an's job.

In the second year of the Yuantong (traditional Chinese: 元統, simplified Chinese: 元统, pinyin: Yuán Tǒng ) Era (year 1334) of Yuan Dynasty, the bridge was eventually finished. It was a covered bridge with Buddhism characteristics. It had 50 rooms on the bridge for the statues of a series Buddhism gods (Buddhas), including the Four Heavenly Kings. Its piers were made of stone and remain now. Its upper structures were wooden, with roofs and tiles to prevent raining and snowing. The average height of each pier above then water level was 41 chǐ, according to the historic record; and the bridge deck was 8 chǐ above then water level of the river. The total length of the bridge was 780 chǐ, which shows it was a very large bridge during that time in the world. The watercut design and structure were applied to the piers of the bridge, to minimize the friction of the river's water flow to piers.

In the 14th year of the Jiaqing Era in Qing Dynasty, the bridge was elongated to as many as 13 piers, and the covers of the bridge were removed and stone handrails were implanted, so since then it has been an "open" stone arch bridge, instead of a covered one.

Many drastic and historic battles happened on the bridge, including the battles of the Taiping Rebellion, the Second Sino-Japanese War, and the Chinese Civil War. Luckily, the main structure of the bridge remained almost intact during and after wars.

In the 1950s, some repairs and enhancements of its structure took place, but the main parts of the bridge did not change.

== Current conditions ==
The bridge is in the key way to Lanxi and Quzhou − two important cities and industrial bases in Western Zhejiang. It goes across the Wu River, and links the North and South districts of urban Jinhua. The road on the bridge is named Bayi South Road (simplified/traditional Chinese: 八一南路, pinyin: Bā Yī Nán Lù, "nan" means south/southern), which is a traffic artery.

The bridge was further elongated and broadened in October 1994; the project was finished in December 1995. The current width of the bridge is 24.5 meters and the total length is about 380 meters.

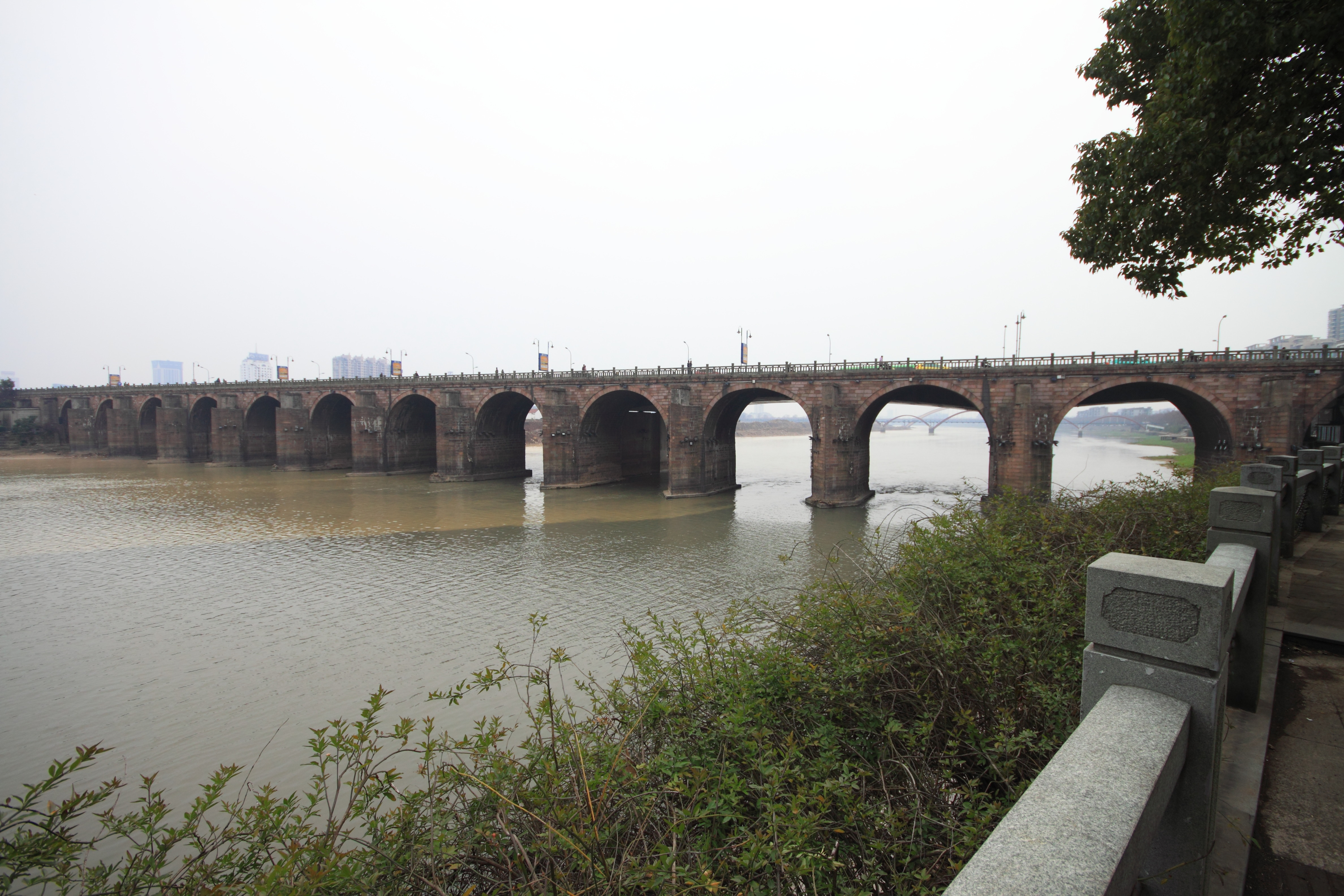
东侧（上游）北岸远景

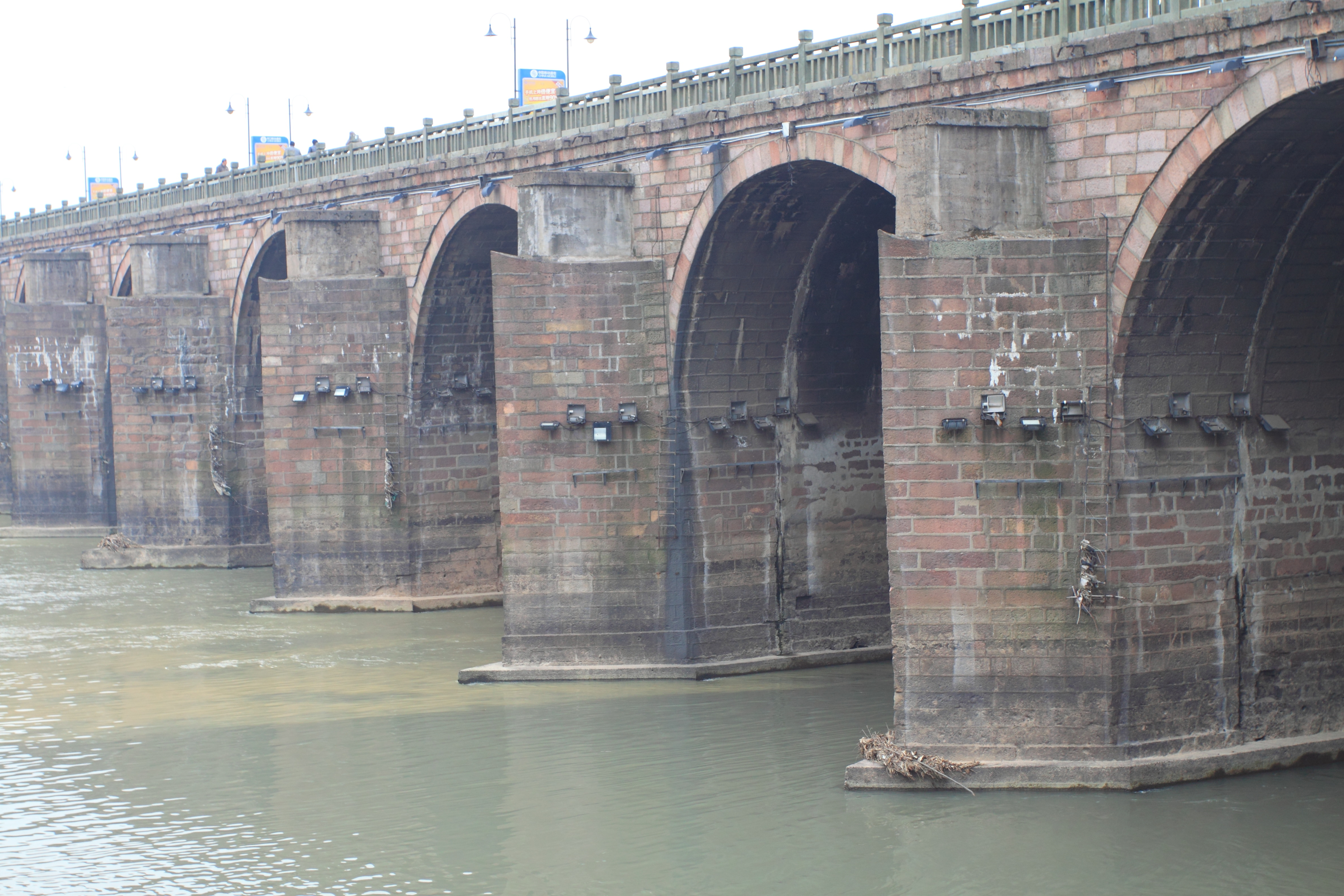
东侧（上游）北岸近景

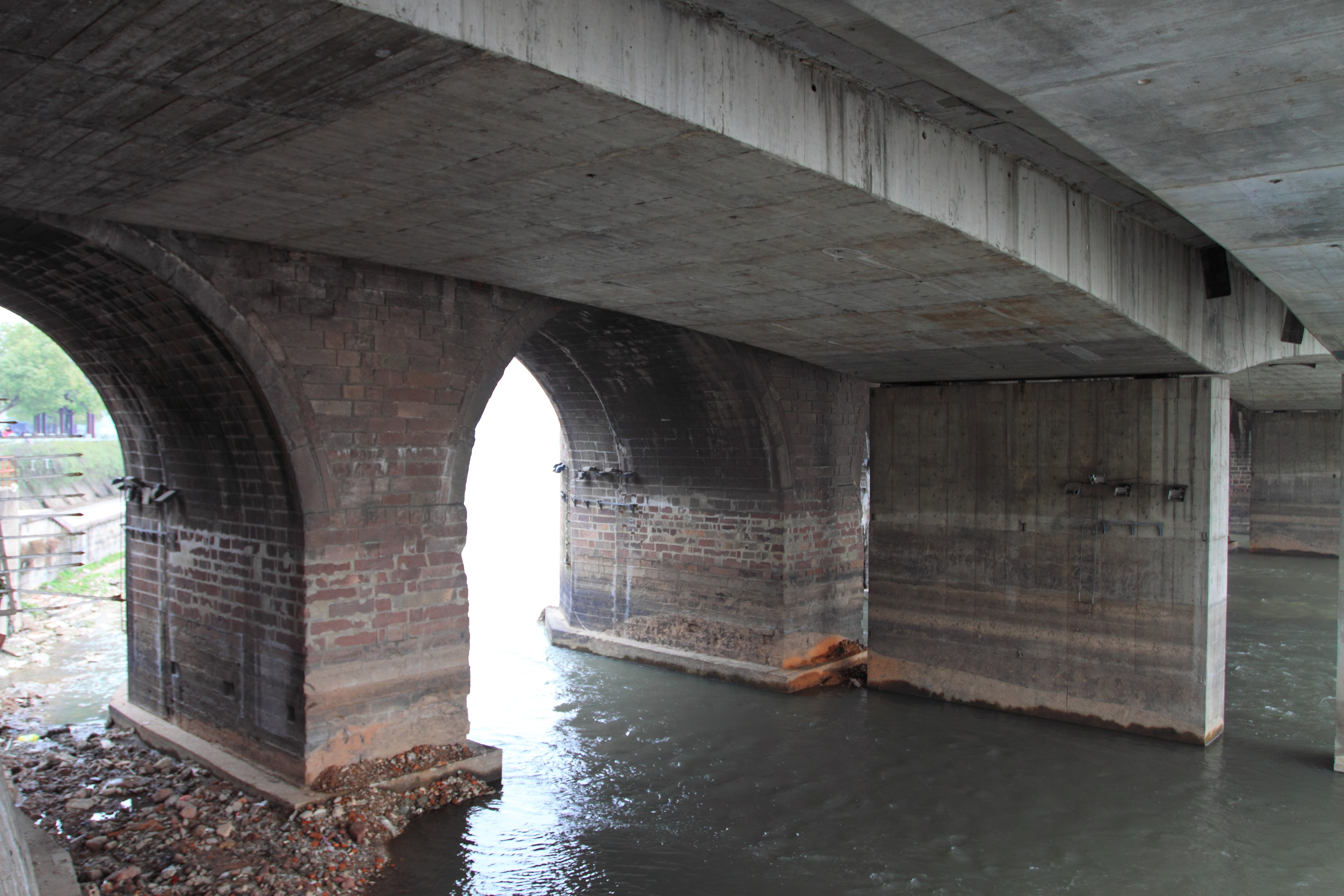
西侧（下游）已加建新桥，图为桥底
