= 1480s in art =

- 1470s
- 1480s in art
- 1490s

Art timeline

The decade of the 1480s in art involved some significant events.

== Events ==
Sandro Botticelli, The Birth of Venus, 1486, Uffizi, Florence

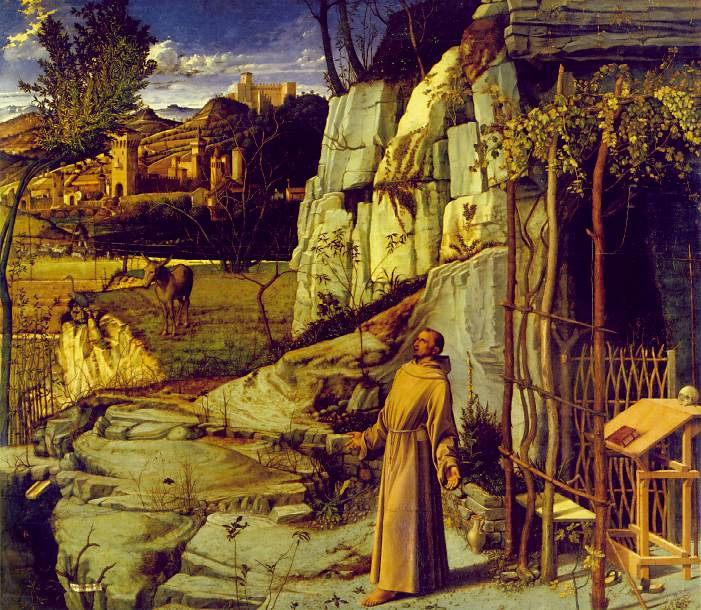
Giovanni Bellini, St. Francis in the Desert, c.1480, Frick Collection, New York

- c.1480–1483 – Tomb of Philippe Pot constructed.
- 1481
  - Altarpiece of St. Nicholas Church, Tallinn from the workshop of Hermen Rode completed.
  - A group of Florentine painters – Sandro Botticelli, Domenico Ghirlandaio and Cosimo Rosselli – begins work on mural frescos in the Sistine Chapel, Rome, with (perhaps under the direction of) Pietro Perugino.
- 1482 – Ludovico Sforza, Duke of Milan, commissions Leonardo da Vinci to make an equestrian statue that would have been the largest in the world. A clay cast is made over sixteen years but the bronze is appropriated for use in cannons and the cast is destroyed when the Duke's castle falls to French invaders.
- 1483 – In the Republic of Venice
  - A competition to design a monument to Bartolomeo Colleoni is won by Andrea del Verrocchio with an equestrian design.
  - Giovanni Bellini is named official painter to the Republic.
- 1484 – Albrecht Dürer makes a Self-Portrait at the age of 13 in silverpoint.
- c.1485-1489 – Jean Colombe completes the Très Riches Heures du Duc de Berry for Charles I, Duke of Savoy.
- 1487
  - Leonardo da Vinci creates his "Vitruvian Man" drawing (approximate date).
  - Bernt Notke creates his painted wooden sculpture of Saint George and the Dragon (Sankt Göran och Draken) for the Storkyrkan (Saint Nicholas' church) in Stockholm.
- 1488 - Giovanni di Stefano (sculptor) makes floor intarsia showing Hermes Trismegistus, Plato and Marsilio Ficino in the west entrance of Siena Cathedral.

== Paintings ==
- 1479-81: Ercole de' Roberti – Santa Maria in Porto Altarpiece
- 1480-90: Sandro Botticelli – The Map of Hell
- 1480
  - Gentile Bellini – Sultan Mehmed II
  - Giovanni Bellini – St. Francis in Ecstasy
  - Sandro Botticelli – Saint Augustine in His Study (fresco in church of the Ognissanti, Florence)
  - Carlo Crivelli – Madonna and Child
  - Domenico Ghirlandaio – St. Jerome in his Study
  - Hans Memling
    - Advent and Triumph of Christ (Alte Pinakothek, Munich)
    - Sibylla Sambetha
    - Virgin and Child with Musician Angels and donor with St. George (diptych; Alte Pinakothek, Munich)
- c.1480
  - Sandro Botticelli – The Resurrected Christ
  - Ercole de' Roberti – Portraits of Giovanni II Bentivoglio and Ginevra Bentivoglio (National Gallery of Art, Washington, D.C.)
  - Piero del Pollaiuolo
    - Portrait of a Young Woman (Uffizi, Florence)
  - Hans Memling
    - Christ Surrounded by Musician Angels
    - Mater Dolorosa
    - Portrait of Barbara van Vlaendenbergh
    - Portrait of Willem Morell
    - The Virgin and Child with an Angel (National Gallery, London)
  - Albertus Pictor – frescoes in Härkeberga Church, Sweden
- 1480-1482: Sandro Botticelli – Temptations of Christ (frescoes in Sistine Chapel, Rome)
- 1480-1483: Sandro Botticelli – Madonna of the Book
- c.1480-1484: Fra Carnevale (or Francesco di Giorgio Martini) – The Ideal City
- c.1480-1485
  - Sandro Botticelli
    - Portrait of a young man holding a medallion
    - (probable artist) – Portrait of a Young Woman (Städel, Frankfurt)
  - Geertgen tot Sint Jans – The Adoration of the Magi
- c.1480-1486: Sandro Botticelli – Portrait of a Young Woman (Simonetta Vespucci?) (Gemäldegalerie, Berlin)
- 1481: Hans Memling – Christ Giving His Blessing
- c.1481-1485: Piero di Cosimo – Madonna and Child Enthroned with Saints Peter, John the Baptist, Dominic, and Nicholas of Bari (Saint Louis Art Museum)
- 1482: Sandro Botticelli – Primavera
- c.1482: Hans Memling – Annunciation (Metropolitan Museum of Art, New York)
- c.1482-1485: Piero di Cosimo – Portraits of Giuliano and Francesco Giamberti da Sangallo (diptych)
- c.1483
  - Sandro Botticelli – Portrait of a Young Man (National Gallery, London)
    - Venus and Mars
    - Pallas and the Centaur
  - Perugino – Portrait of Lorenzo di Credi
- c.1483-1487 (unfinished): Leonardo da Vinci (probable) – Portrait of a Musician
- 1484: Hans Memling – St. Christopher and Saints
- c.1485: Hans Memling
  - Adam and Eve
  - Bathsheba
  - Triptych of Earthly Vanity and Divine Salvation
- c.1485-1488: Sandro Botticelli – The Judgement of Paris
- c.1485-1490: Heinrich Lützelmann (probable painter, perhaps identical with "Master of the Drapery Studies") – The Passion of Christ (series of 10 oils for Sainte-Madeleine, Strasbourg)
- 1486: Carlo Crivelli – The Annunciation, with Saint Emidius
- c.1486: Sandro Botticelli – The Birth of Venus
- 1487: Hans Memling – Diptych of Maarten van Nieuwenhove (Old St. John's Hospital, Bruges)
- c.1487-1488: Michelangelo – The Torment of Saint Anthony
- 1489:
  - Hans Memling – St. Ursula Shrine (reliquary for Old St. John's Hospital, Bruges)
  - Cima da Conegliano – Madonna and Child Enthroned with Saint James and Saint Jerome and Madonna and Child Enthroned with Two Male Saints

Sandro Botticelli [[Cestello Annunciation]]

== Births ==
- 1480: Domenico Alfani – Italian painter (died 1553)
- 1480: Giovanni Francesco Caroto – Italian painter active in Verona (died 1555/1558)
- 1480: Lorenzo Lotto – Italian painter, draughtsman and illustrator (died 1556)
- 1480: Hans Leonhard Schäufelein – German painter, designer and wood engraver (died 1540)
- 1480: Andrea di Aloigi - Italian painter (died 1521)
- 1480: Palma il Vecchio – Italian painter of the Venetian school (died 1528)
- 1480: Bartolomé Ordóñez - Spanish sculptor (died 1520)
- 1480: Hans Brüggemann - German sculptor (died 1521)
- 1480: Marcantonio Raimondi – Italian engraver (died 1534)
- 1480: Hans Baldung – German Renaissance artist as painter and printmaker in woodcut (died 1545)
- 1480: Jean Clouet – miniaturist and painter working in France during the Renaissance (died 1541)
- 1480: Nicola Filotesio – Italian painter, architect and sculptor (died 1547)
- 1480: Damià Forment - Spanish sculptor (died 1540)
- 1480: Joachim Patinir – Flemish Northern Renaissance history and landscape painter (died 1524)
- 1480: Nicola da Urbino - Italian maiolica and ceramicist (died 1540/1547)
- 1480: Albrecht Altdorfer – German painter, pioneer of landscape in art (died 1538)
- 1480: Erhard Altdorfer - German Early Renaissance printmaker, painter, and architect (died 1561)
- 1480: Jerg Ratgeb – German painter (died 1526)
- 1480: Jan Rombouts the Elder - Flemish Renaissance painter, glass painter, draftsman, printmaker and glass designer (died 1535)
- 1480: Gerino da Pistoia - Italian painter and designer of the Renaissance (died 1529)
- 1480: Raimo Epifanio Tesauro – Italian Renaissance painter specializing in frescoes (died 1511)
- 1480: Jan Wellens de Cock - Flemish painter and draughtsman of the Northern Renaissance (died 1527)
- 1480: Hans Maler zu Schwaz - German painter and portraitist (died 1526/1529)
- c.1480: Benedetto Montagna – Italian engraver and painter (died 1555/1558)
- 1480/1482: Bernardino Luini – North Italian painter from Leonardo's circle (died 1532)
- 1480/1485: Girolamo da Santa Croce - Italian Renaissance painter (died 1556)
- 1480/1485: Girolamo Savoldo – Italian High Renaissance painter (died 1548)
- 1480/1490: Adriaen Isenbrandt – Flemish Northern Renaissance painter (died 1551)
- 1480/1490: Joos van Cleve – Netherlandish painter (died 1540/1541)
- 1480/1490: Ortolano Ferrarese – Italian painter of the Ferrara School (died 1525)
- 1480/1490: Conrad Meit – German-born sculptor (died 1550/51)
- 1481: Hans Krafft the Elder, German medallist (died 1542)
- 1481: Baldassare Peruzzi – Italian architect and painter (died 1536)
- 1481: Benedetto Montagna – Italian engraver (died 1555/1558)
- 1481: Benvenuto Tisi (il Garofalo) – Late-Renaissance-Mannerist Italian painter of the School of Ferrara (died 1559)
- 1482: Richard Aertsz – Dutch historical painter (died 1577)
- 1482: Giulio Campagnola – Italian engraver and painter, invented the stipple technique in engraving (died 1515)
- 1482: Franciabigio – Italian painter of the Florentine Renaissance (died 1525)
- 1483: Raphael – Italian painter and architect of the High Renaissance (died 1520)
- 1483: Chén Chún – Chinese artist specializing in "ink and wash" paintings (died 1544)
- 1483: Agostino Busti – High Renaissance Italian sculptor (died 1548)
- 1483: Il Pordenone – Italian painter of the Venetian school, active during the Renaissance (died 1539)
- 1483: Simon Bening – miniature painter of the Ghent-Bruges school (died 1561)
- 1484: Niklaus Manuel – Swiss dramaturg, painter, graphic artist and politician (died 1530)
- 1484: Giacomo Raibolini, Italian painter (died 1557)
- 1485: Titian – leader of the 16th-century Venetian school of the Italian Renaissance (died 1576)
- 1485: Urs Graf – Swiss Renaissance painter and printmaker of woodcuts, etchings and engravings (d. c.1529)
- 1485: Sebastiano del Piombo (byname of Sebastiano Luciani) – Italian Renaissance-Mannerist painter, famous for his combination of the colors of the Venetian school and the monumental forms of the Roman school (died 1547)
- 1485: Jost de Negker, Dutch woodcut-maker, printer and publisher (died 1544)
- 1485: Francesco Vecellio – Venetian painter of the early Renaissance, best known as the elder brother of the painter Titian (died 1560)
- 1485: Jean Duvet – French Renaissance goldsmith and engraver (died 1562)
- 1485: Wolf Huber – Austrian painter, printmaker, and architect, a leading member of the Danube School (died 1553)
- 1485: Girolamo Romanino, Italian painter (died 1566)
- 1485: Jean Juste – Italian sculptor (died 1549)
- 1485: Agostino Marti - Italian painter from Lucca (died 1537)
- 1485: Étienne Peson - French "primitive" painter (died 1551)
- 1485: Antonio Semini – Italian painter active in his native Genoa (died 1547)
- 1485: Lambert Barnard - English Renaissance painter (died 1567)
- 1486: Paolo Moranda Cavazzola – Italian painter active mainly in his hometown of Verona (died 1522)
- 1486: Domenico di Pace Beccafumi – Italian Renaissance-Mannerist painter (died 1551)
- 1486: Jacopo Sansovino – Italian sculptor and architect, especially around the Piazza San Marco in Venice (died 1570)
- 1486: Andrea del Sarto – Italian painter from Florence (died 1531)
- 1486: Giacomo Francia – Italian engraver (died 1557)
- 1486: Francesco Torbido - Italian painter (died 1562)
- 1487: Francesco Xanto Avelli – Italian ceramicist (died 1542)
- 1487: Giulio Raibolini, Italian painter (died 1540)
- 1487: Andrea Sabbatini – Italian painter of the Renaissance (died 1530)
- 1487-1491: Bernard van Orley – Flemish Northern Renaissance painter and draughtsman (died 1541)
- 1487: Bonifazio Veronese - Italian Mannerist painter from Venice (died 1553)
- 1488: Alonso Berruguete – Spanish painter, sculptor and architect (died 1561)
- 1488: Xie Shichen – Chinese landscape painter during the Ming dynasty (d. unknown)
- 1488: Girolamo della Robbia, Italian ceramicist (died 1566)
- 1489: Antonio da Correggio – painter of the Parma school of the Italian Renaissance (died 1534)

== Deaths ==
- 1489: Simon Marmion – Netherlandish painter (born 1425)
- 1489: Marco del Buono - Italian painter and woodworker (born 1402)
- 1488: Andrea del Verrocchio, influential Italian sculptor, goldsmith and painter who worked at the court of Lorenzo de' Medici in Florence (born 1435)
- 1487: Baccio Baldini - Italian engraver in Florence (born 1436)
- 1486: Cristoforo de Predis - Italian miniaturist and illuminator (born 1440)
- 1486: Nicolas Froment – French painter (born 1435)
- 1485: Shingei – Japanese painter and artist in the Muromachi period (born 1431)
- 1484: Mino da Fiesole – Italian sculptor from Tuscany (born 1429)
- 1484: Silvestro de Buoni - Italian Quattrocento painter (born unknown)
- 1484: Fra Carnevale - Italian painter of the Quattrocento (born 1420/1425)
- 1484: Di Biagio Baldassarre del Firenze - Italian Renaissance painter of the Florentine School (born 1430)
- 1483: Stefano d'Antonio di Vanni - Italian Renaissance painter (born 1405)
- 1482: Hugo van der Goes, Flemish painter (born 1440)
- 1482: Giovanni di Paolo – Italian painter and illustrator of manuscripts (born 1399/1403)
- 1482: Luca della Robbia – Italian sculptor from Florence, noted for his terracotta roundels (born 1400)
- 1482: Agnolo degli Erri - Italian Gothic painter of the Italian Renaissance (born 1440)
- 1482: Bartolomeo degli Erri - Italian Gothic painter of the Italian Renaissance (born 1447)
- 1481: Jean Fouquet – French painter, a master of both panel painting and manuscript illumination, and the apparent inventor of the portrait miniature (died 1420)
- 1481: Agostino di Duccio – Italian early Renaissance sculptor (born 1418)
- 1481: Sano di Pietro – early Italian Renaissance painter from Siena (born 1406)
- 1480: Vecchietta – Siennese painter (born 1410)
- 1480: Simone Papa the Elder – Italian painter of the Renaissance period (born 1430)
- 1480: Joos van Wassenhove – Early Netherlandish painter who later worked in Italy (born 1410)
- 1480: Lin Liang – Chinese painter of plum, flower, and fruit works during the Ming dynasty (born 1416)
- 1480: Antonio Vivarini - Italian painter of the Vivarini family of painters (born 1440)
