= 1537 in art =

List of years in art	(table)
- … 1527; 1528; 1529; 1530; 1531; 1532; 1533; 1534; 1535; 1536; 1537; 1538; 1539; 1540; 1541; 1542; 1543; 1544; 1545; 1546; 1547 …
- Art; Archaeology; Architecture; Literature; Music; Philosophy; Science; +...

Events from the year 1537 in art.

== Works ==
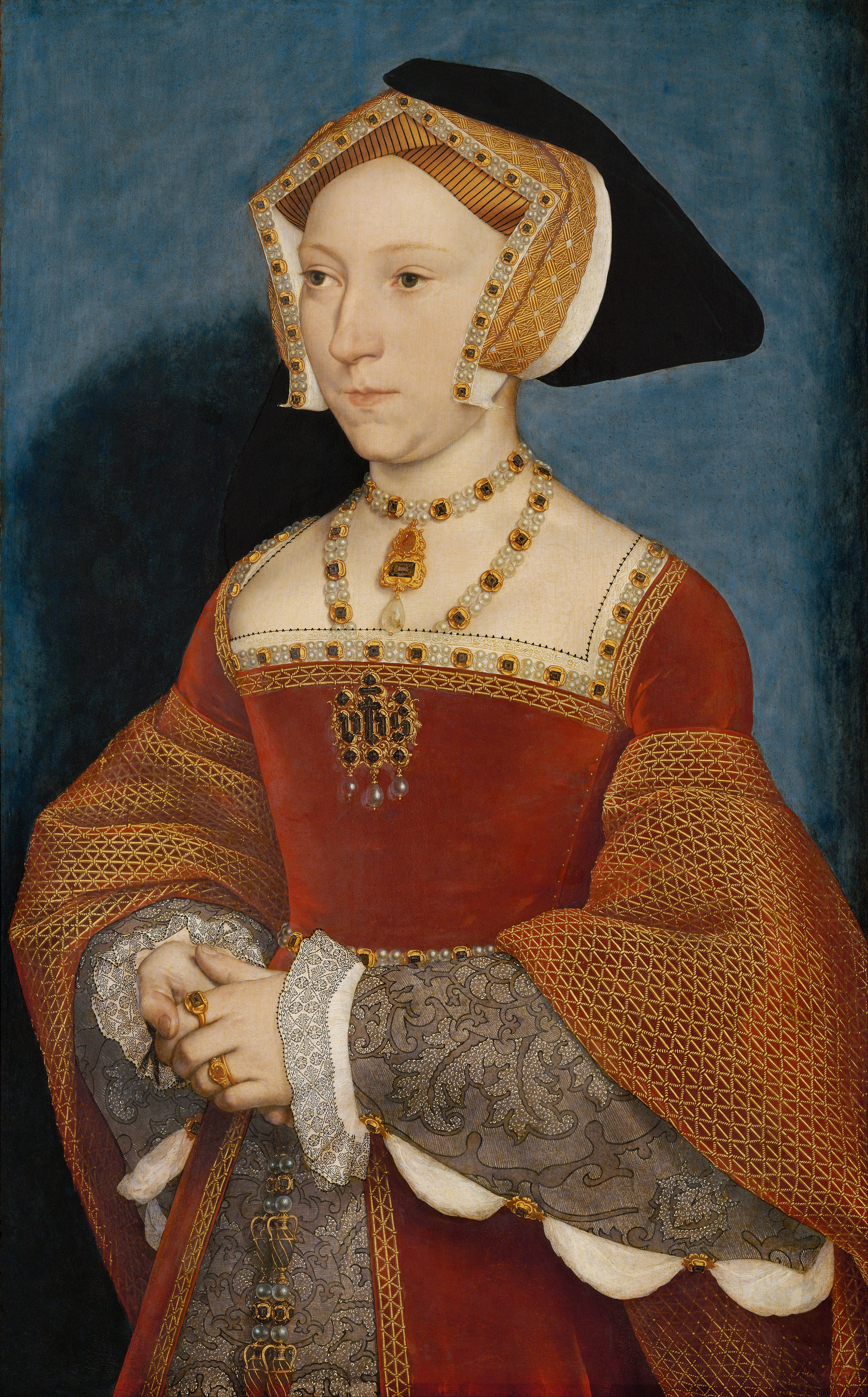
Holbein's portrait of Jane Seymour

- Corneille de Lyon – Portrait of Mary of Guise (approximate date)
- Hans Holbein the Younger
  - Portrait of Henry VIII
  - Portrait of Henry VIII for Palace of Whitehall (approximate date; original destroyed by fire 1698)
  - Portrait of Jane Seymour
- Lucas Horenbout – Portrait miniature of Jane Seymour (approximate date)
- Domenico di Pace Beccafumi – Saint Bernard of Siena Preaching

== Births ==
- Philip Galle, Flemish engraver and printmaker (died 1612)
- Giovanni Battista Naldini, Italian painter of a late-Mannerism in Florence (died 1591)
- Germain Pilon, French sculptors of the French Renaissance (died 1590)
- 1537/1538 - Natale Bonifacio, engraver and producer of woodcuts (died 1592)

== Deaths ==
- Baldassare Peruzzi, Italian architect and painter (born 1481)
- Agostino Marti, Italian painter from Lucca (born 1485)
- Guglielmo da Marsiglia, Italian painter of stained glass (born 1475)
- Lorenzo di Credi, Italian painter and sculptor (born 1459)
- Vittore Gambello, Italian Renaissance sculptor (born 1460)
