= Bronzoni =

Bronzoni is an Italian surname. Notable people with the surname include:

- Adamo Pedro Bronzoni (born 1985), Italian-Peruvian film editor and producer
- William Bronzoni (1927–1987), Italian footballer

== See also ==
- Bronzini
- Ronzoni
