= Erri =

Erri may refer to:

- Agnolo degli Erri (1440–1482), Italian painter, brother of Bartolomeo
- Bartolomeo degli Erri (1447–1482), Italian painter, brother of Agnolo
- Erri De Luca (born 1950), Italian writer
