= 1542 in art =

Events from the year 1542 in art.

== Events ==
- Painter Paul Lautensack is expelled from Nuremberg as a result of his Reformist fanaticism.

== Works ==
=== Paintings ===
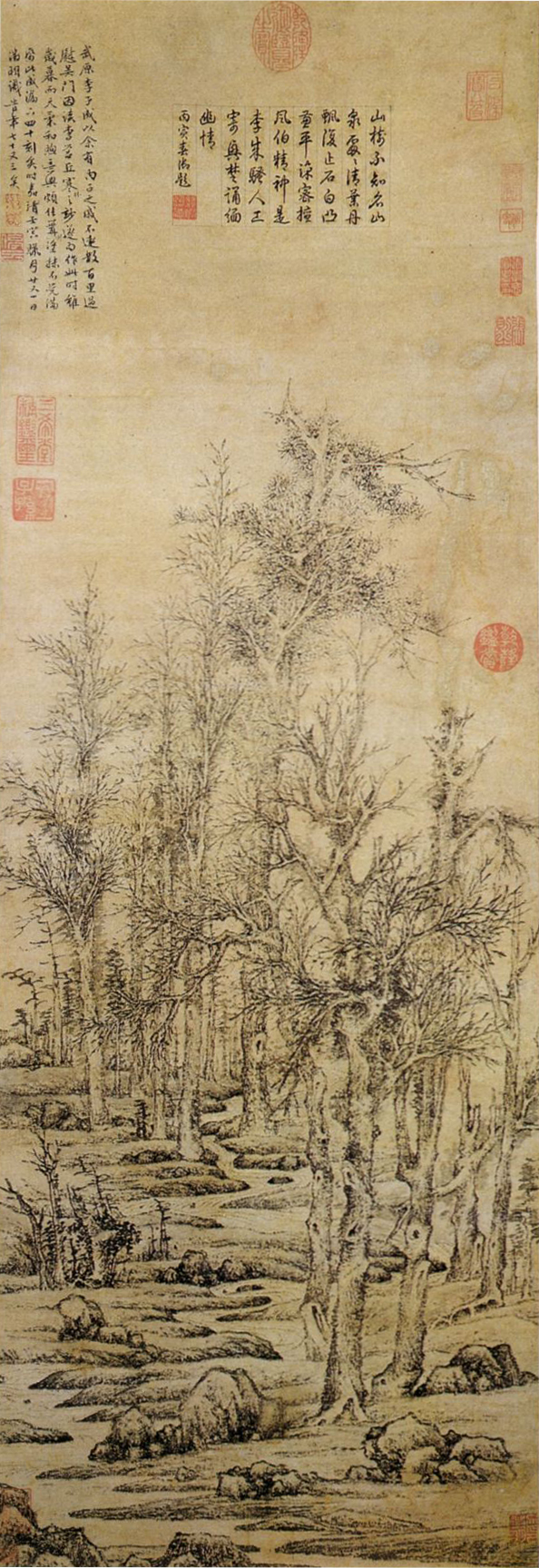
Wen Zhengming, Wintry trees after Li Cheng, 1542

- Wen Zhengming – Wintry trees after Li Cheng
- Titian
  - Portrait of Clarissa Strozzi
  - Portrait of Ranuccio Farnese
- Bronzini – Crossing of the Red Sea
- Domenico Beccafumi – Madonna and Child with Infant John the Baptist

== Births ==
- date unknown - Joris Hoefnagel. Flemish painter and engraver (died 1601)
- probable
  - Gillis Coignet, Flemish painter (died 1599)
  - Ambroise Dubois, Flemish painter of the second School of Fontainebleau (died 1614)
  - Felice Riccio, Italian painter (died 1605)
  - Andrea Vicentino, Italian Mannerist painter (died 1617)
  - Federico Zuccari, Italian Mannerist painter and architect (died 1609)

== Deaths ==
- date unknown
  - Dosso Dossi, Italian Renaissance painter who belonged to the Ferrara School of Painting (born 1490)
  - Hans Krafft the Elder, German medallist (born 1481)
  - Jan van Amstel, Dutch Northern Renaissance painter (born 1500)
- probable
  - Francesco Xanto Avelli, Italian ceramicist (born 1487)
  - Vasco Fernandes, Portuguese Renaissance painter (born 1475)
