= 1529 in art =

Events from the year 1529 in art.

== Events ==
- Carlo de' Medici acquires the Adoration of the Magi by Filippino Lippi
- Alfonso I d'Este, Duke of Ferrara creates the most magnificent gallery of his time, his studiolo or Camerini d'alabastro ('small alabaster room'), now usually known as his "Camerino"
- Jan van Scorel and Maarten van Heemskerck are painting portraits in Haarlem
- First record of Qian Gu painting in Ming Dynasty China

== Works ==
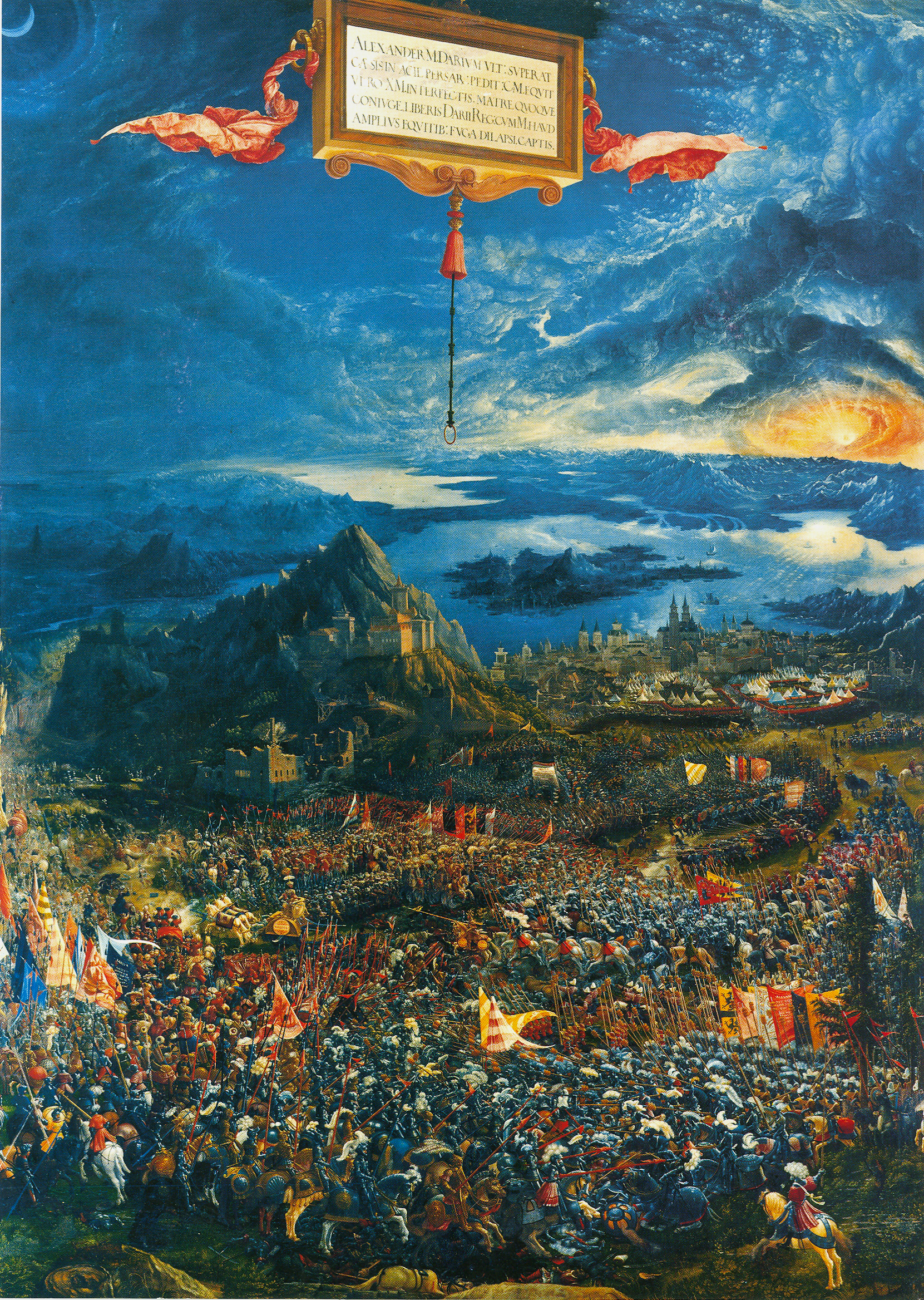
Altorfer, Battle of Issus

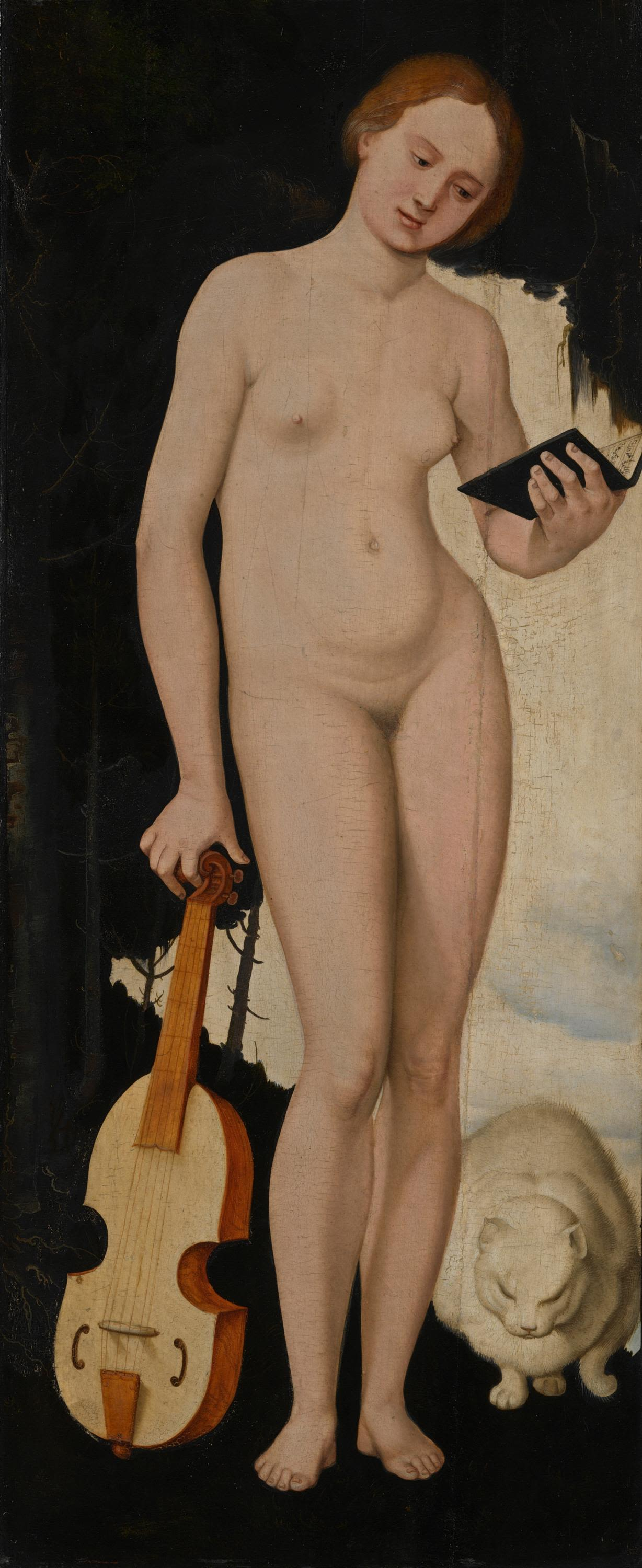
Baldung, Allegory of Music

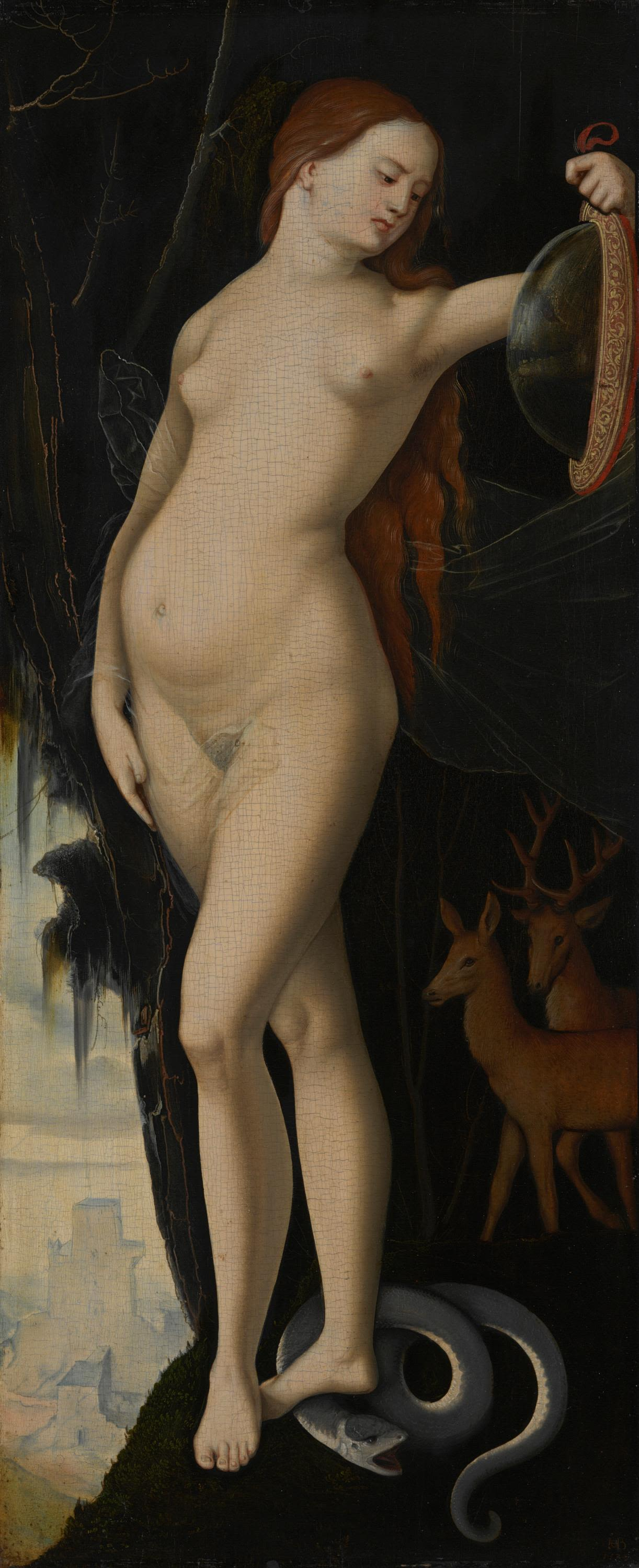
Baldung, Woman with Mirror and Queue

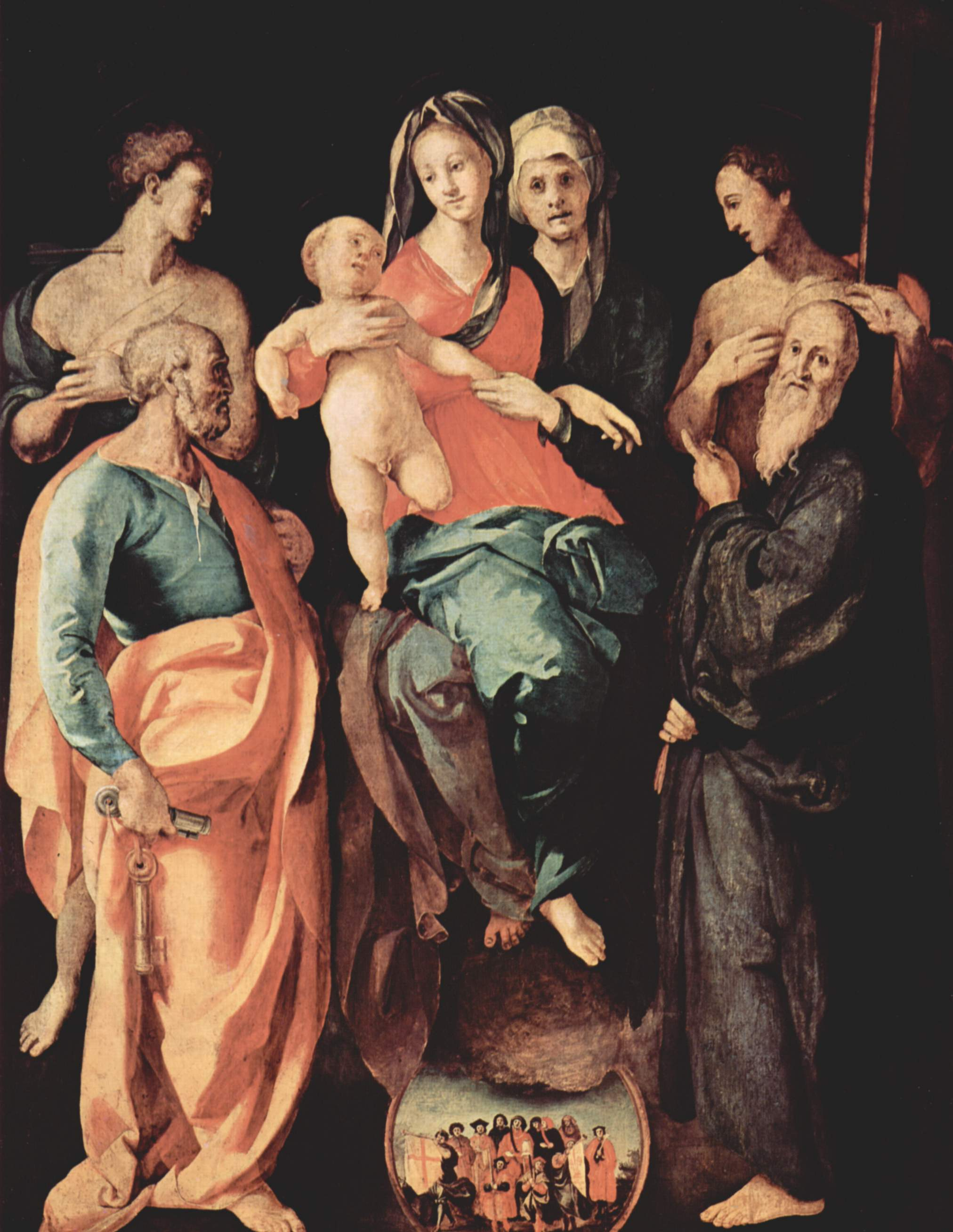
Pontormo, Madonna with Child, Saint Anne and Four Saints

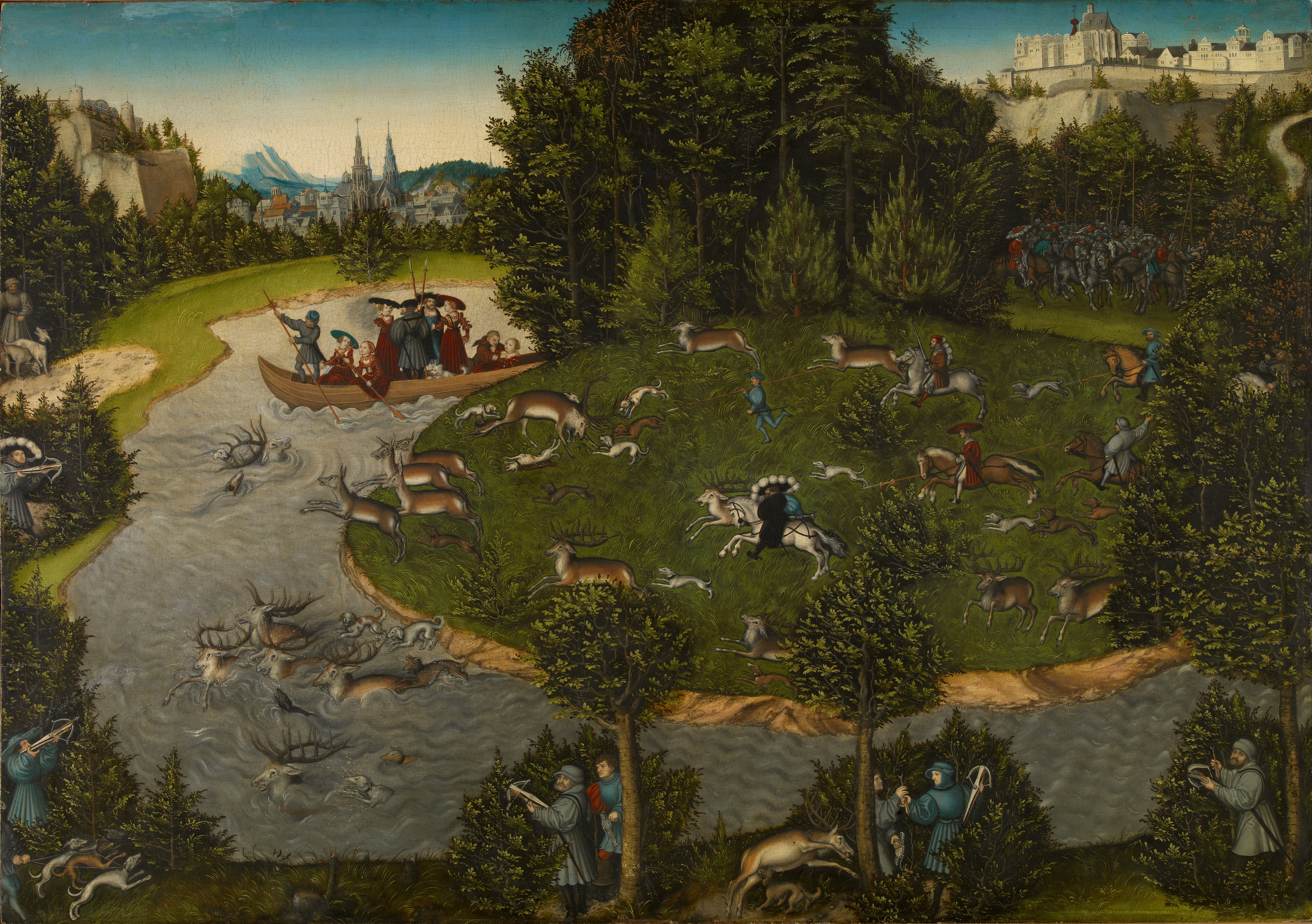
Cranach, The Stag Hunt

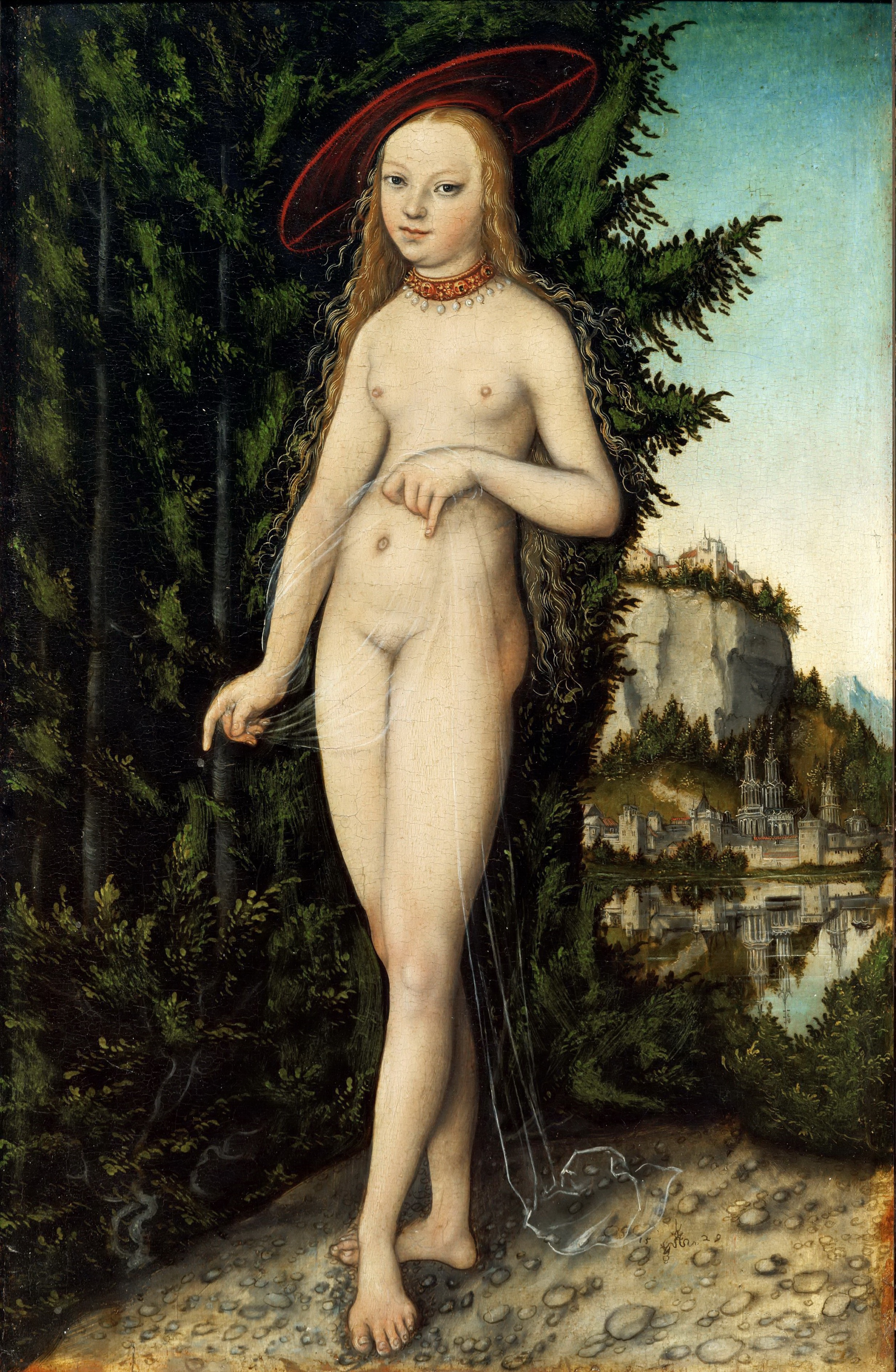
Cranach, Venus Standing in a Landscape

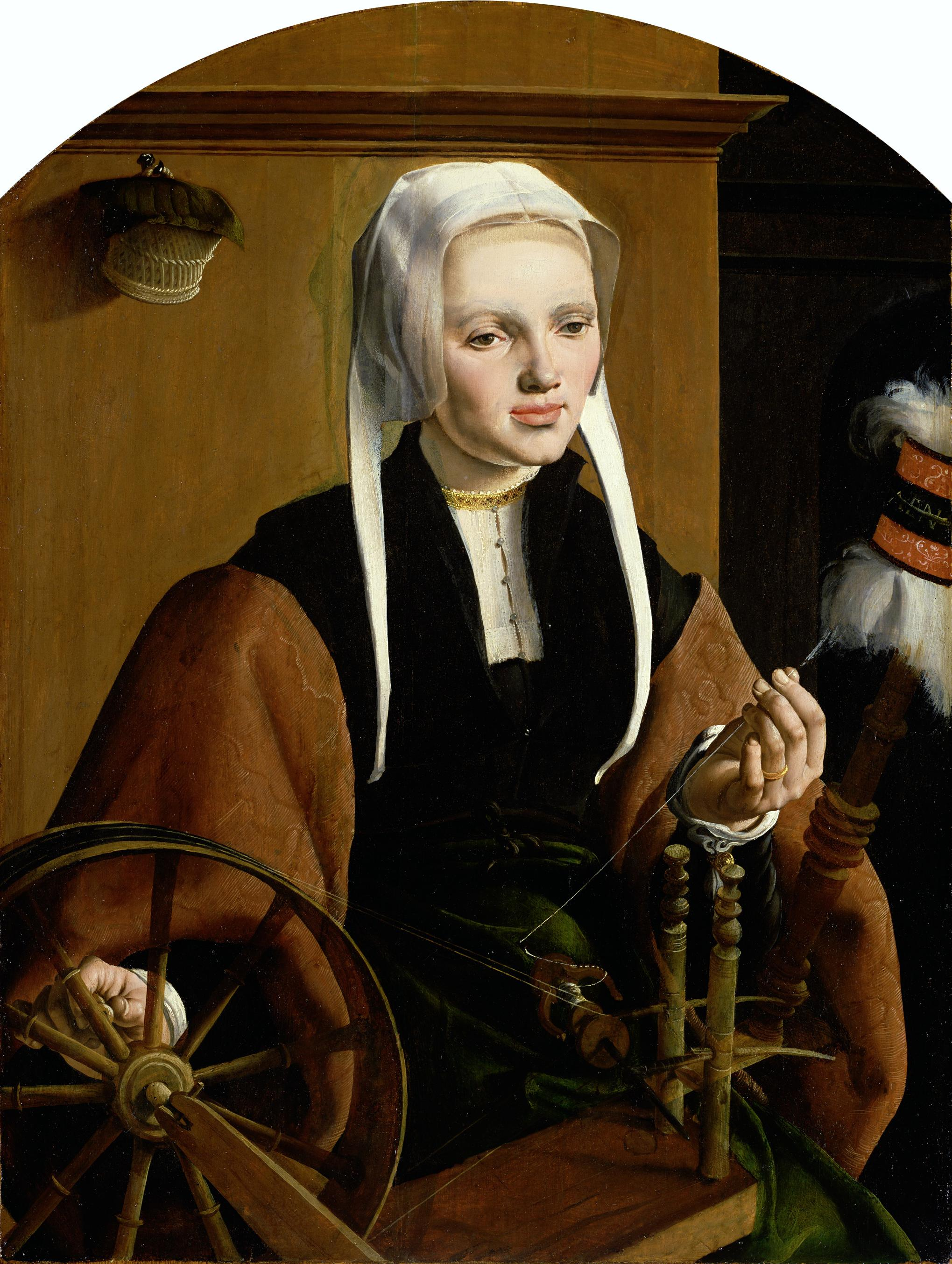
Heemskerk, Anna Codde
- Albrecht Altdorfer'sThe Battle of Alexander at Issus
- Hans Baldung's Allegory of Music and Woman with Mirror and Queue
- Lucas Cranach the Elder's Martin Luther, The Stag Hunt of the Elector Frederick the Wise and Venus Standing in a Landscape
- Maarten van Heemskerck's Portrait of Anna Codde
- Pontormo's Madonna with Child, Saint Anne and Four Saints

== Births ==
- Valerio Cioli, Italian sculptor (died 1599)
- Giambologna, Sculptor of marble and bronze statuary (died 1608)

== Deaths ==
- Alessandro Araldi, Italian painter active mainly in Parma (born 1460)
- Giovanni della Robbia, Italian Renaissance ceramic artist (born 1469)
- Guillaume de Marcillat, French painter and stained glass artist (born 1470)
- Urs Graf, Swiss Renaissance painter and printmaker of woodcuts, etchings and engravings (born c.1485)
- Rocco Marconi, Italian painter active mainly in Venice and Treviso (b. before 1490)
- Francesco Morone, Italian painter active mainly in Verona (born 1471)
- Gerino da Pistoia - Italian painter and designer of the Renaissance (born 1480)
- Lo Spagna, Spanish-born Italian painter of the High-Renaissance (born unknown)
- Peter Vischer the Elder, German sculptor (born 1455)
- 1526/1529: Hans Maler zu Schwaz, German painter and portraitist (born 1480)

== See also ==
- Ancient Greek art
- Art in the Protestant Reformation and Counter-Reformation
