= 1548 in art =

Events from the year 1548 in art.

== Works ==
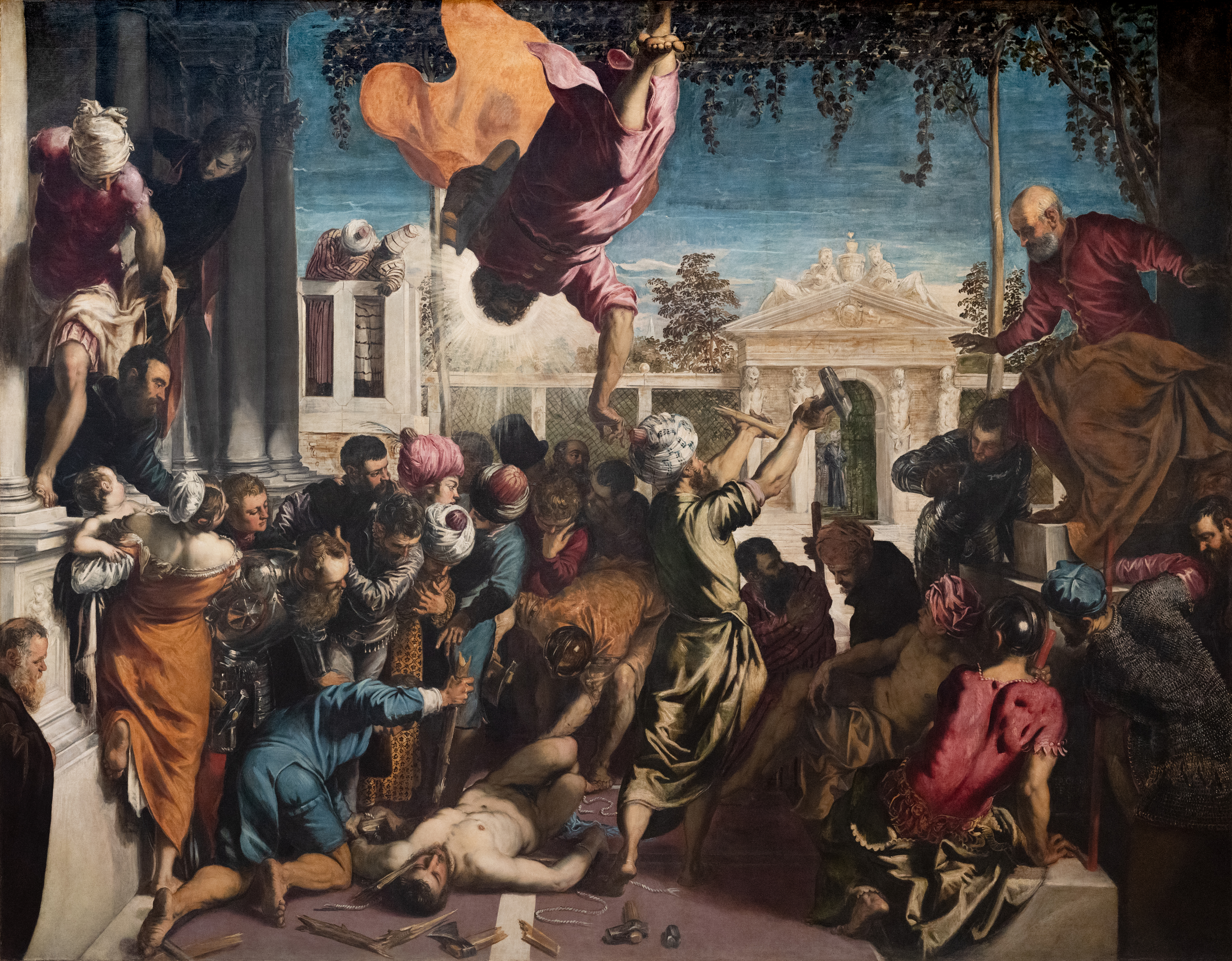
Tintoretto Miracle of the Slave

Titian Equestrian Portrait of Charles V

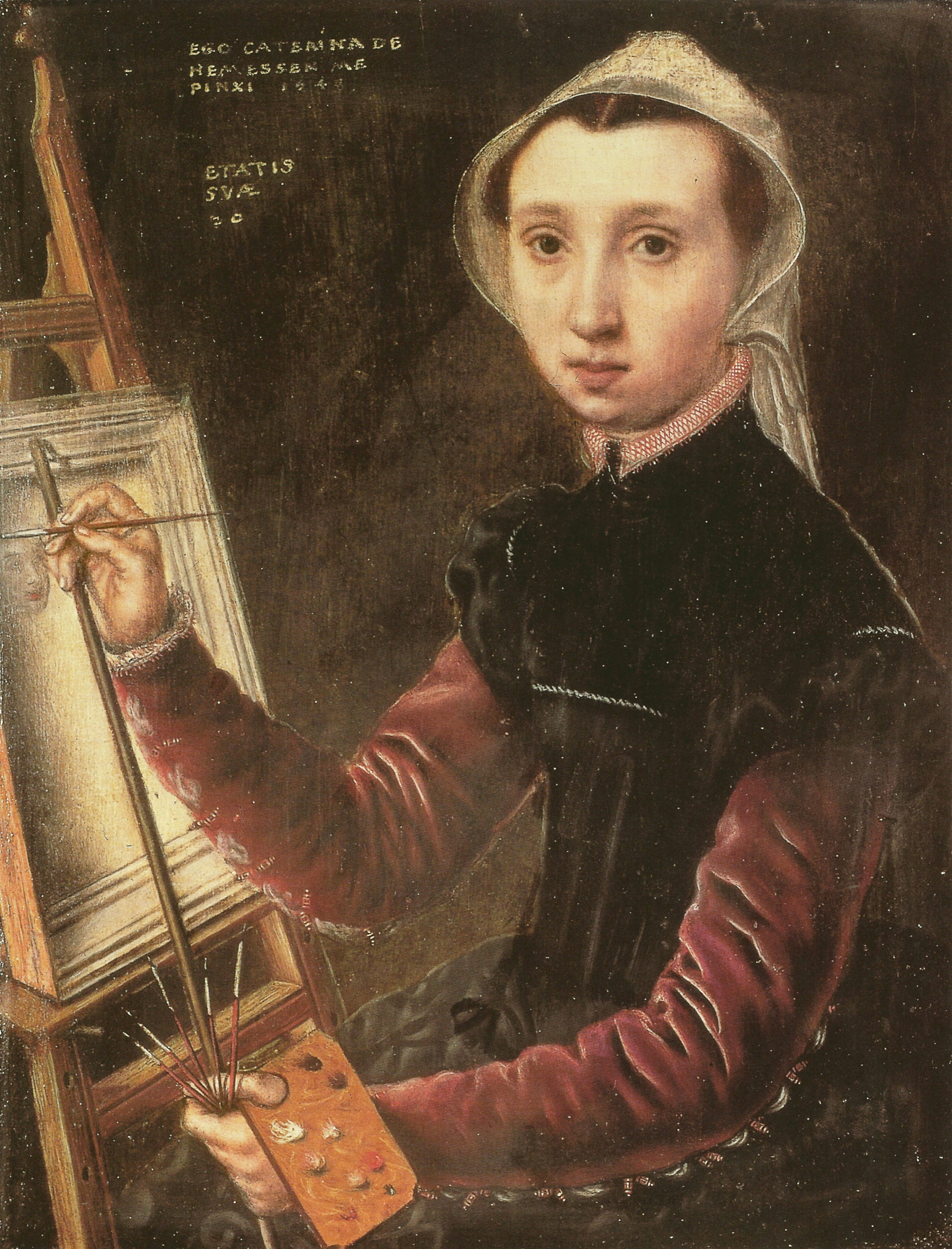
Caterina van Hemessen Self-portrait

=== Painting ===
- Girolamo Siciolante da Sermoneta – Madonna with Six Saints (for San Martino (Bologna))
- Frans Floris – The Judgement of Paris (approximate date)
- Tintoretto
  - Miracle of the Slave
  - St Mark's Body Brought to Venice
- Titian
  - Equestrian Portrait of Charles V
  - Venus with Organist and Cupid
- Caterina van Hemessen
  - Portrait of a Woman (Rijksmuseum)
  - Self-portrait
  - Young girl
- Jan Sanders van Hemessen – The Calling of Saint Matthew
- Daniele da Volterra – Madonna with Child, young Saint John the Baptist and Saint Barbara (approximate date)

=== Sculpture ===
- Pierino da Vinci - Young River God with Theee Putti

== Publications ==
- Paolo Pino - Dialogo di pittura

== Births ==
- March 18 - Cornelis Ketel, Dutch Mannerist painter (died 1616)
- May - Karel van Mander, Flemish painter, poet and biographer (died 1606)
- August 26 - Bernardino Poccetti, Italian Mannerist painter and printmaker (died 1612)
- date unknown
  - Ippolito Andreasi, Italian painter (died 1608)
  - Pietro Francavilla, Franco-Flemish sculptor (died 1615)
- probable
  - Peter Candid, Dutch painter and architect (died 1628)
  - 1548/1550: Palma il Giovane, Italian Mannerist painter from Venice (died 1628)

== Deaths ==
- June 11 – Agostino Busti, Italian High Renaissance sculptor (born 1483)
- November 10 – Giovanni Battista Averara, Italian painter (born 1508)
- date unknown
  - Matthys Cock, Flemish landscape painter (born 1505)
  - Battista Dossi, Italian painter who belonged to the Ferrara School of Painting (born 1490)
  - Martin Schaffner, German painter and medallist (born 1478)
- probable
  - Jean Mone, German-Flemish sculptor (born 1500)
  - Matteo dal Nasaro Veronese, Italian sculptor and engraver (born unknown)
  - Girolamo Savoldo, Italian High Renaissance painter (born 1480/1485)
