= Santo Stefano, Poggio alla Malva =

Church building in Carmignano, Italy

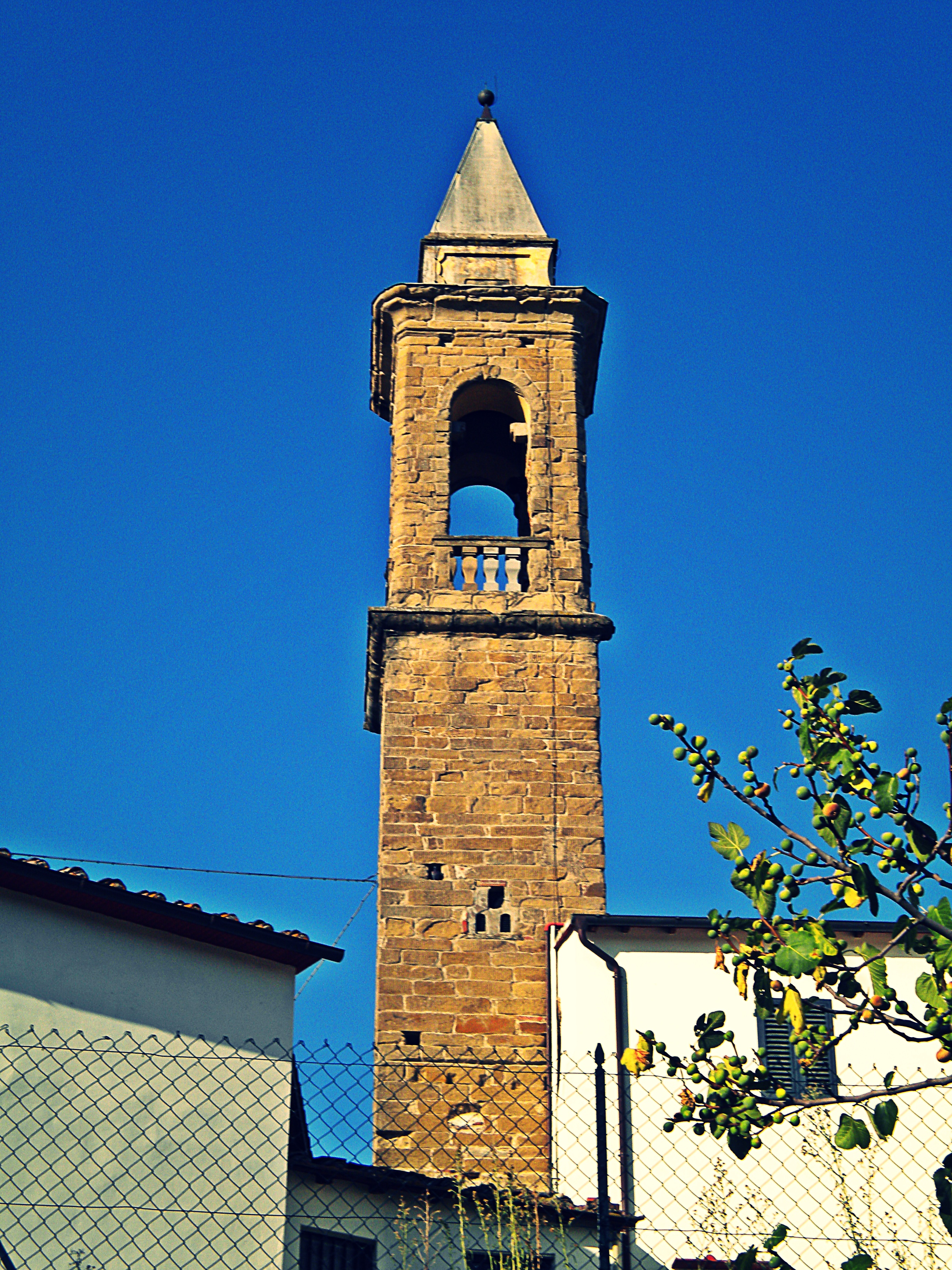
View of the Bell Tower of Santo Stefano Church

Santo Stefano is a Roman Catholic oratory or small church located on Via San Stefano #1 in the neighborhood of Poggio alla Malva, near the town of Carmignano, province of Prato, region of Tuscany, Italy.

== History ==
The oratory was expanded in 1742-48, when it took on the functions of the former parish church of Santo Stefano "Alle Busche", located near the shores of the Arno, and prone to flooding. That church is documented since the 13th century. The oratory also gained a parish house and bell-tower.

On the counterfacade is suspended an organ on a balcony. Above it are two paintings by Crivelli from the 1950s, depicting Sts Antonio and John the Baptist. Crivelli also painted the Via Crucis.

On the right wall are the remains of a fresco depicting the Flagellation. It was moved here from the old abandoned church, along with the frescoes of the Kiss of Judas and an Adoration of the Shepherds by painters of the school of Spinello Aretino or Gerini. An altar on the right has a canvas depicting the Burial of St Stephen (circa 1650) by Domenico Landini. Across the church is an altar with an Enthroned Madonna and Child with Saints Sylvester, Stephen, Bartholemew, and Lawrence (1475-1480) by Neri di Bicci. The main altar was refashioned in the mid-16th century. The crucifix is by a follower of Baccio da Montelupo.
