= 1599 in art =

Events from the year 1599 in art.

== Events ==
- July 23 - Caravaggio receives his first public commission for paintings.

== Works ==
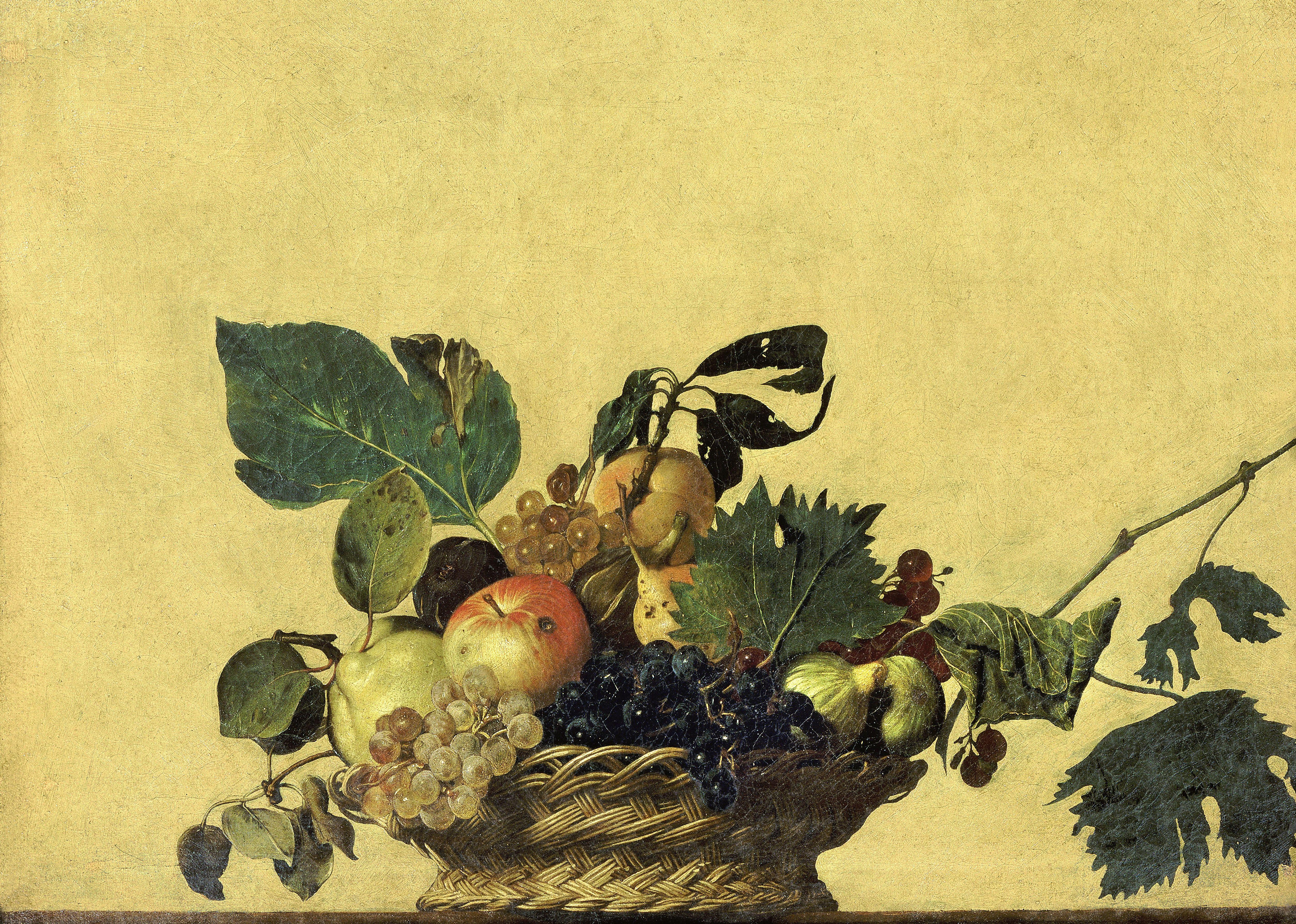
Caravaggio, Basket of Fruit

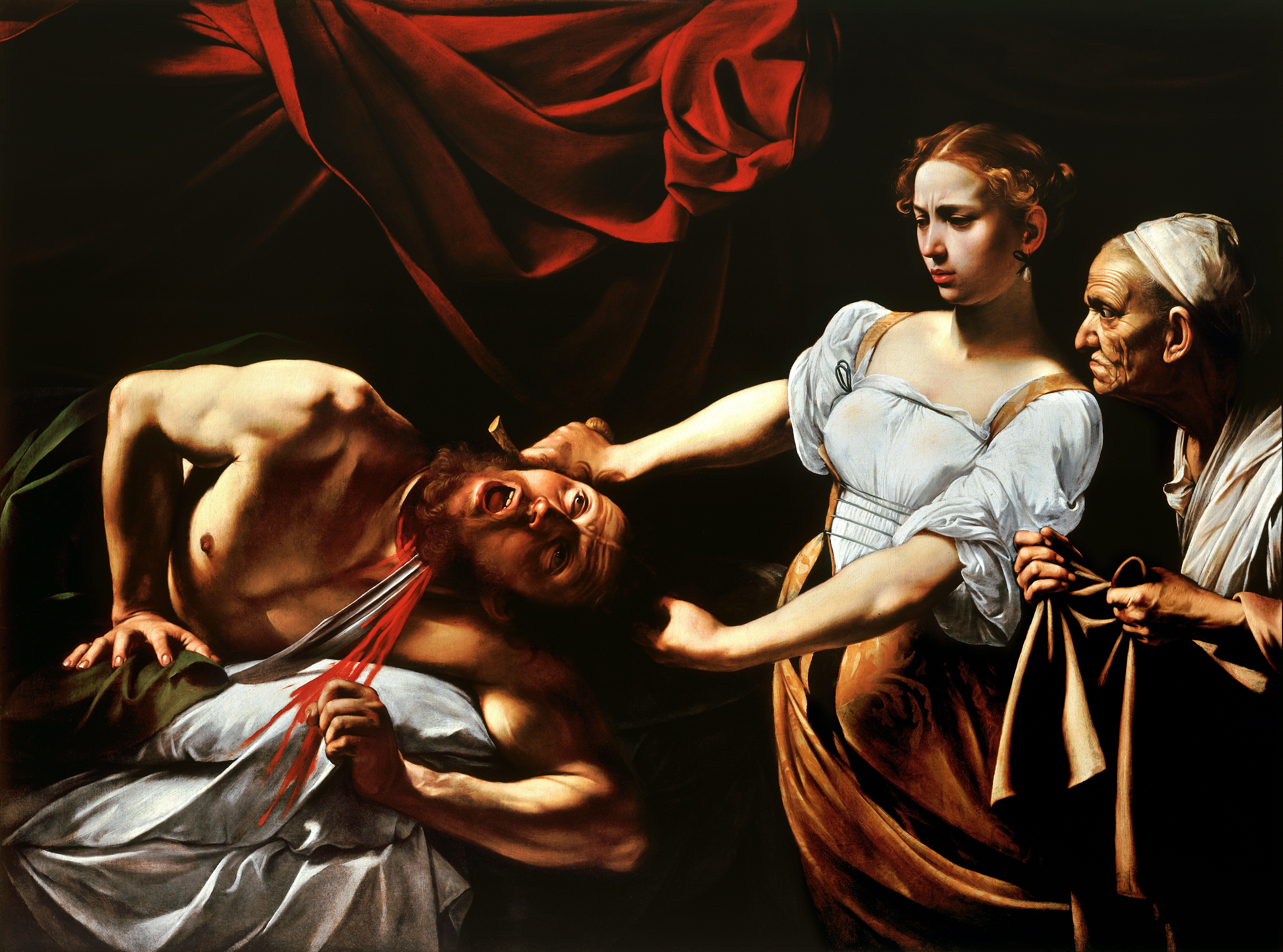
Caravaggio, Judith Beheading Holofernes

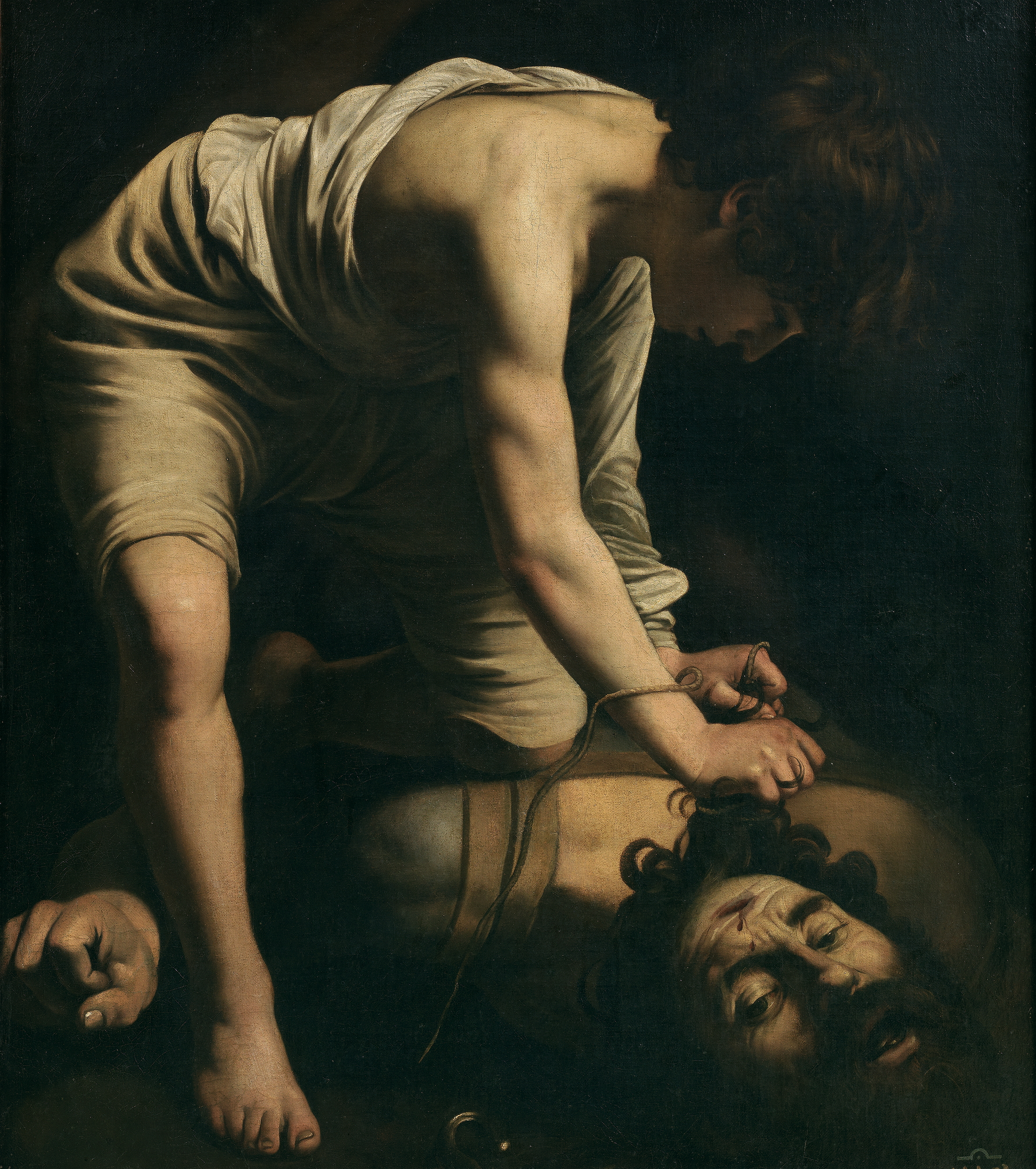
Caravaggio, David and Goliath

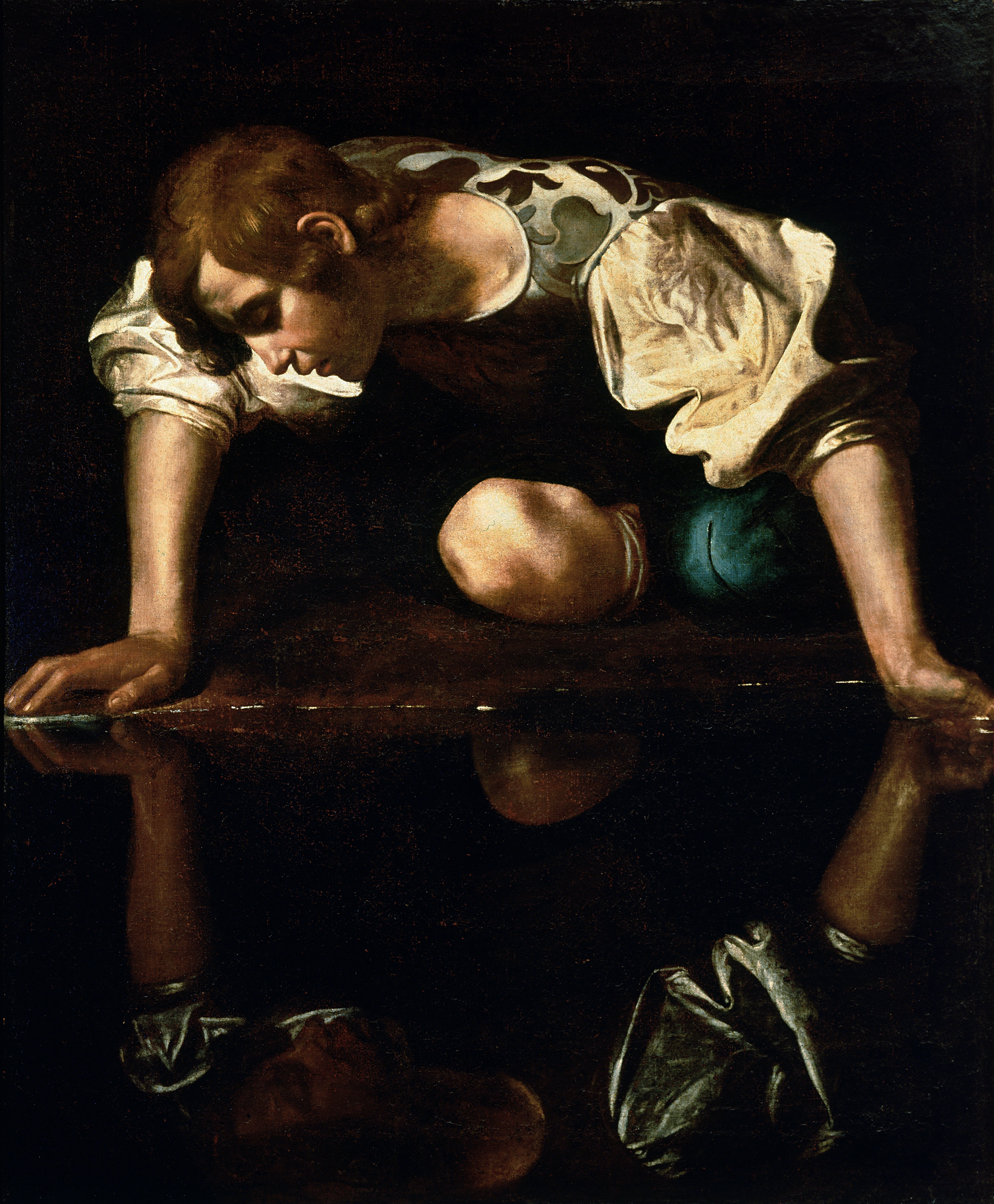
Caravaggio, Narcissus
- Paul Bril – Mountain Scene (miniature)
- Caravaggio
  - Basket of Fruit
  - Judith Beheading Holofernes
  - David and Goliath
  - Narcissus
- Pieter Pietersz the Elder – Poor Parents, Rich Children
- Hendrick van Balen the Elder – The Judgement of Paris

== Births ==
- February 15 - Pope Alexander II, Papal patron of the arts commissioned architectural and sculptural works by Gianlorenzo Bernini (died 1667)
- March 22 – Anthony van Dyck, Flemish Baroque artist who became England's leading court painter (died 1641)
- baptized June 6 – Diego Velázquez, Spanish painter (died 1660)
- September 25 – Francesco Borromini (Francesco Castelli), prominent and influential Baroque architect in Rome (died 1667)
- November 30 – Andrea Sacchi, Italian painter of High Baroque Classicism (died 1661)
- December – Pieter van Laer, Dutch painter of genre scenes (died 1642)
- December 11 – Pieter Codde, Dutch painter of genre works (died 1678)
- date unknown
  - Francisco Collantes, Spanish Baroque era painter (died 1656)
  - Willem Cornelisz Duyster, Dutch painter from Amsterdam (died 1635)
  - Jan Miel, Flemish painter (died 1663)
  - Gerrit Reynst, Dutch merchant and art collector (died 1658)
  - Giovanni Battista Vanni, Italian painter of frescoes and engraver (died 1660)
  - Robert Walker – English portrait painter (died 1658)
- probable
  - Bartolommeo Coriolano, Italian engraver (died 1676)
  - Antioine Le Nain, French painter of the Le Nain family of painters (died 1648)

== Deaths ==
- October 27 - Gillis Coignet, painter (born 1540)
- date unknown
  - Alberto di Giovanni Alberti, Tuscan architect, wood carver and painter (born 1525)
  - Antoine Caron, French master glassmaker, illustrator, Mannerist painter and a master (teacher) at the School of Fontainebleau (born 1521)
  - Valerio Cioli, Italian sculptor (born 1529)
  - Gillis Coignet, Flemish painter (born 1542)
  - Wendel Dietterlin, German painter/architect, wrote treatise on the five orders entitled Architectura (1598) filled with Mannerist ornament (born 1550)
  - Giuseppe Meda, Italian painter, architect and hydraulics engineer (born c.1534)
  - Dominicus Lampsonius, Flemish poet and artist (born 1532)
  - Francesco Potenzano, Italian painter, poet, and promoter
  - Friedrich Sustris, Italian-born Dutch painter working in Bavaria (born c.1540)
  - Mayken Verhulst, Flemish miniaturist and watercolour painter (born 1518)
  - Pierre Woeiriot, French engraver, goldsmith, painter, sculptor and medallist (born 1532)
