= 1557 in art =

Events from the year 1557 in art.

== Events ==
- Painter Biagio Betti becomes a monk of the order of the Theatines of San Silvestro al Quirinale, most of his works being found in the monastery of that order in Rome.

== Works ==
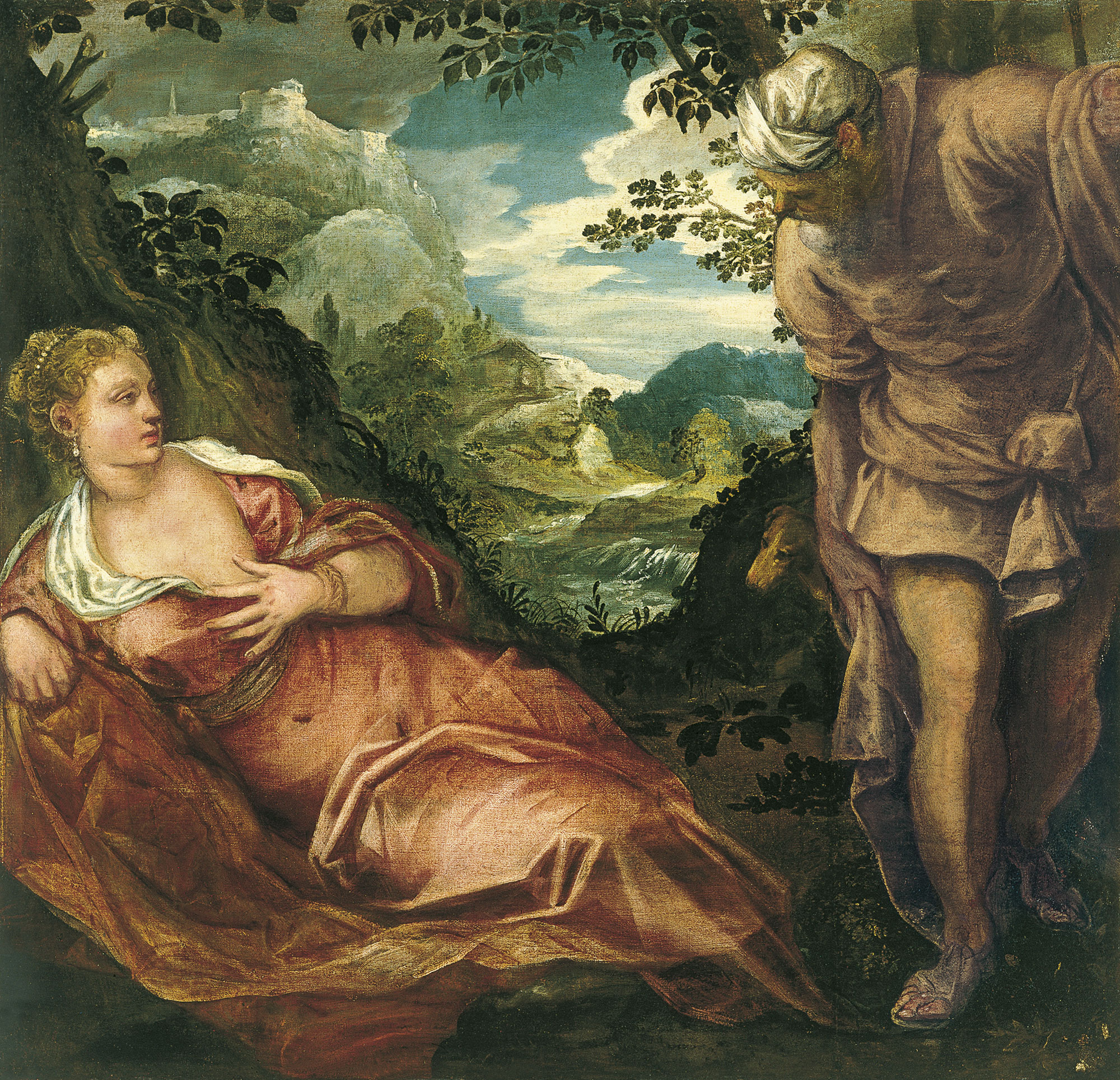
Tintoretto – Tamar and Judah, Museo del Prado

- Sofonisba Anguissola
  - Family Portrait: Minerva, Amilcare and Asdrubale Anguissola
  - Portrait of Bianca Ponzoni Anguissola, the artist's mother (Staatliche Museen, Berlin)
- Federico Barocci – Martyrdom of St. Sebastian (Urbino Cathedral)
- Giovanni Battista Moroni – Portrait of a Man before the Virgin and Child
- Lattanzio Gambara – Apollo
- Joan de Joanes – Portrait of Alfonso V, King of Aragon
- Tintoretto – Tamar and Judah
- Daniele da Volterra – Massacre of the Innocents

== Births ==
- June 10 - Leandro Bassano, Venetian artist and younger brother of Francesco Bassano the Younger (died 1622)
- August 16 - Agostino Carracci, Italian painter and printmaker (died 1602)
- September 16 - Pietro Tacca, Italian sculptor and follower of Giambologna (died 1640)
- December 23 - Giovanni Battista Crespi, Italian painter, sculptor and architect (died 1632)
- date unknown
  - Alessandro Capriolo, Italian engraver and printer (died unknown)
- probable (born 1557/1560) - Benedetto Bandiera, Italian painter (died 1634)

== Deaths ==
- January 2 - Pontormo, Italian Mannerist painter and portraitist from the Florentine school (born 1494)
- January 3 - Giacomo Raibolini, Italian painter (born 1484)
- July 16 - Vincenzo degli Azani, Italian painter (date of birth unknown)
- October 5 - Francesco Bacchiacca, Florentine Mannerist painter (born 1494)
- date unknown
  - Giovanni del Giglio, Italian painter
  - Lorenzo Lotto, Italian painter, draughtsman and illustrator (born 1480)
  - Giacomo Raibolini, Italian painter (born 1484)
