= Giovanni Battista Averara =

Italian painter

Giovanni Battista Averara (1508 – November 10, 1548) was an Italian painter of the Renaissance period. He was born in Bergamo. Little is known of this landscape painter who died at a young age from a dog bite. He painted in the style of Titian. He is mentioned by the biographer Tassi, and may be confused with Giovanni Battista de Averara.
