= 1547 in art =

Events from the year 1547 in art.

== Events ==
- In England, King Edward VI issues Reformation injunctions which leads to the destruction of many rood screens, and many religious works painted over

== Works ==
=== Paintings ===
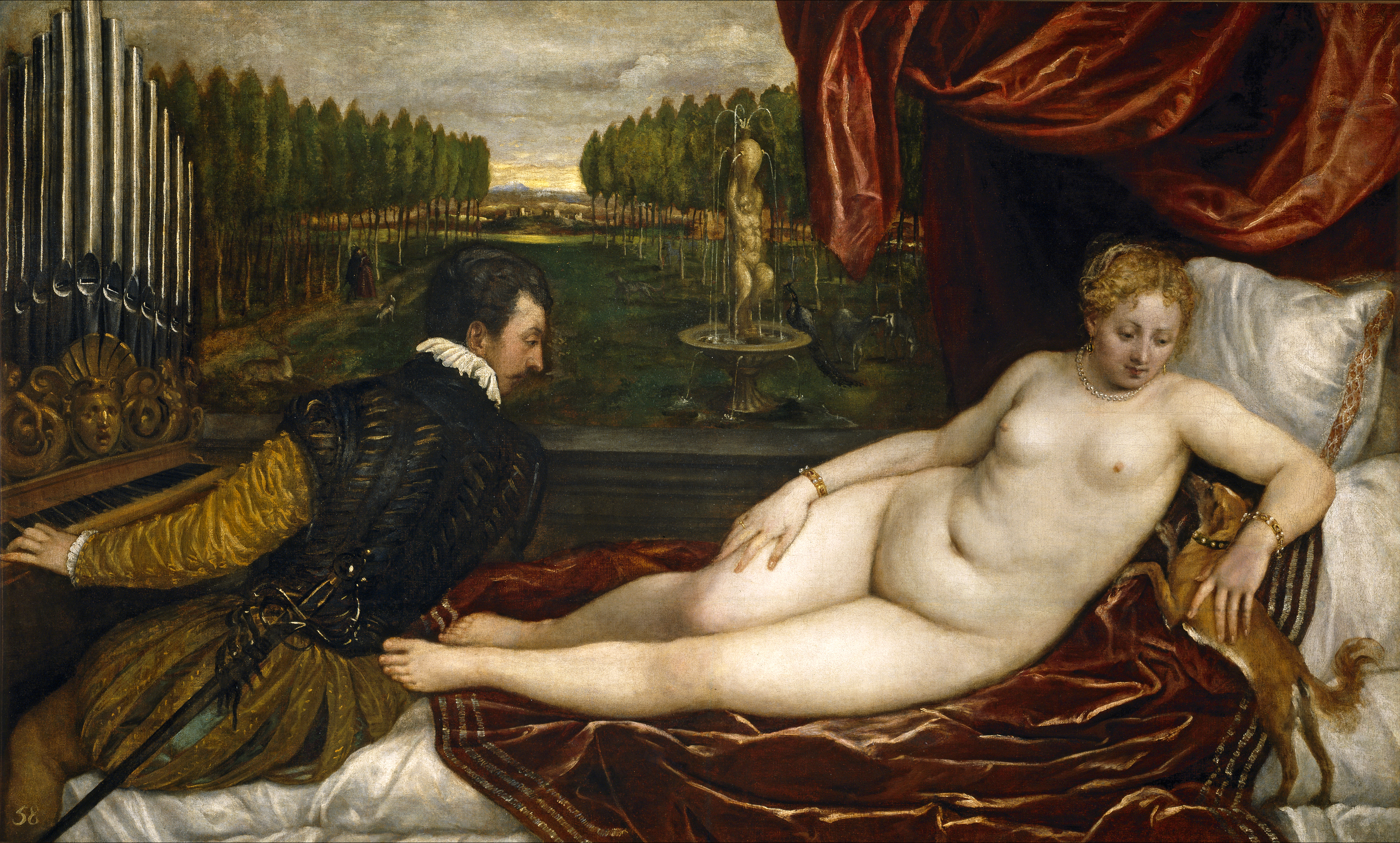
Titian – Venus and Music

- Lucas Cranach the Elder – Last Supper (Wittenberg)
- Gianfrancesco Penni – Lust
- Andrea Schiavone – Adoration of the Magi
- Tintoretto – Esther Before Ahasuerus
- Titian
  - Saint John the Evangelist on Patmos
  - Venus and Musician (original version, possibly lost)

== Births ==
- date unknown
  - Jacopo Ligozzi, Italian painter, illustrator, designer, and miniaturist of the late Renaissance and early Mannerist styles (died 1627)
  - Matteo Perez d'Aleccio, Italian painter of devotional, historical and maritime subjects (died 1616)
  - Unkoku Togan, Japanese painter (died 1618)
- probable
  - Nicholas Hilliard, English goldsmith and limner best known for his portrait miniatures (died 1619)
  - Jan Soens, Dutch painter from 's-Hertogenbosch (died 1611)
  - Ding Yunpeng, Chinese painter especially of human figures and landscapes (died 1628)

== Deaths ==
- June 21 – Sebastiano del Piombo (byname of Sebastiano Luciani), Italian Renaissance-Mannerist painter who combined the influences of the Venetian school and the Roman school (born 1485)
- August 3 – Fra Paolo da Pistoia, Italian painter and Dominican friar (born 1490)
- August 31 - Nicola Filotesio, Italian painter, architect and sculptor (born 1480)
- October 14 - Perino del Vaga, Italian painter (born 1501)
- December 23 - Pellegrino da San Daniele, Italian painter in the late-Quattrocento and Renaissance styles (born 1467)
- date unknown
  - Jörg Breu the Younger, German painter, son of Jörg Breu the Elder (born 1510)
  - Giovanni Cariani, Italian painter of the high-Renaissance (born 1490)
- probable - Antonio Semini, Italian painter active in his native Genoa (born 1485)
