= Qian Gu =

Chinese landscape painter

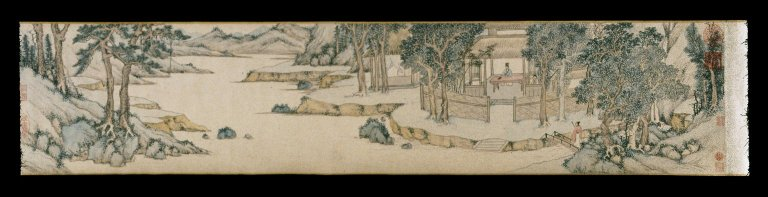
Qian Gu, Landscape Handscroll, ca. 1556, ink on paper, 27.7 × 872 cm. Collection of Brooklyn Museum

Qian Gu (Ch'ien Ku, traditional Chinese: 錢穀; simplified Chinese: 钱谷; pinyin: Qián Gǔ; ca. (1508-unknown) was a Chinese landscape painter during the Ming dynasty (1368–1644). His date of death is unknown, but is traditionally given as around 1578.

Qian was born in Changzhou in the Jiangsu province. His style name was 'Shubao' and his sobriquet was 'Qingshi'. Qian's painting used a soft but firm style. Qian often used subjects found in his observations around the south of the Yangzi River.

Qian was a client of the literatus Wang Shizhen (1526–90), and frequently spent time at Wang's home in Taicang in his later years. In 1572 Qian painted an album of scenes along the Grand Canal while accompanying Wang Shizhen on a journey to the capital at Beijing.
