= Last Supper (Cranach) =

1565 altarpiece by Lucas Cranach the Younger

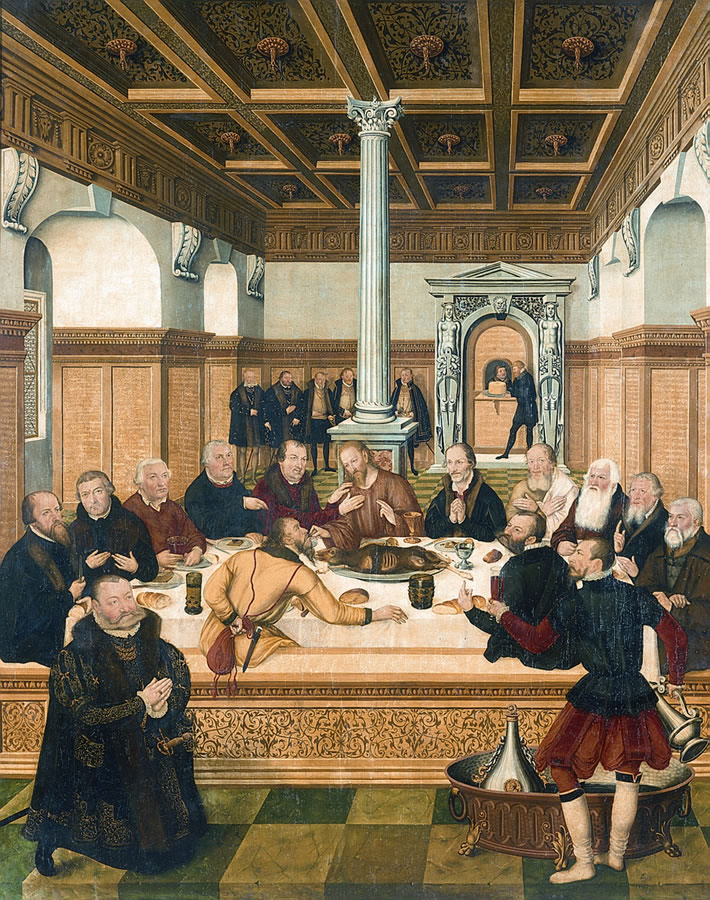
- Leading Reformers portrayed as the Apostles, and the Elector of Saxony kneeling.
- Artist: Lucas Cranach the Younger
- Year: 1565

After Luther's objections to large public religious images had started to fade, Lucas Cranach the Elder, along with his son and workshop began to work on several altarpieces of the Last Supper, among other subjects.

In some such depictions Christ is shown with the traditional halo, but the apostles are represented as leading reformers, without halos. The altarpiece of the main church in Martin Luther's home of Wittenberg has a traditional representation of the Last Supper in the main panel, except that the apostle having a drink poured is a portrait of Luther, and the server may be one of Cranach. By the time the painting was installed in 1547, Luther was dead. Other panels show the Protestant theologians Philipp Melanchthon and Johannes Bugenhagen, pastor of the church, though not in biblical scenes. Other figures in the panels are probably portraits of figures from the town, now unidentifiable. Another work, the Altarpiece of the Reformers in Dessau, by Lucas Cranach the Younger (1565) shows all the apostles except Judas as Protestant churchmen or nobility, and it is now the younger Cranach shown as the cupbearer. However such works are rare, and Protestant paintings soon reverted to more traditional depictions.
