= Francesco Potenzano =

Italian painter

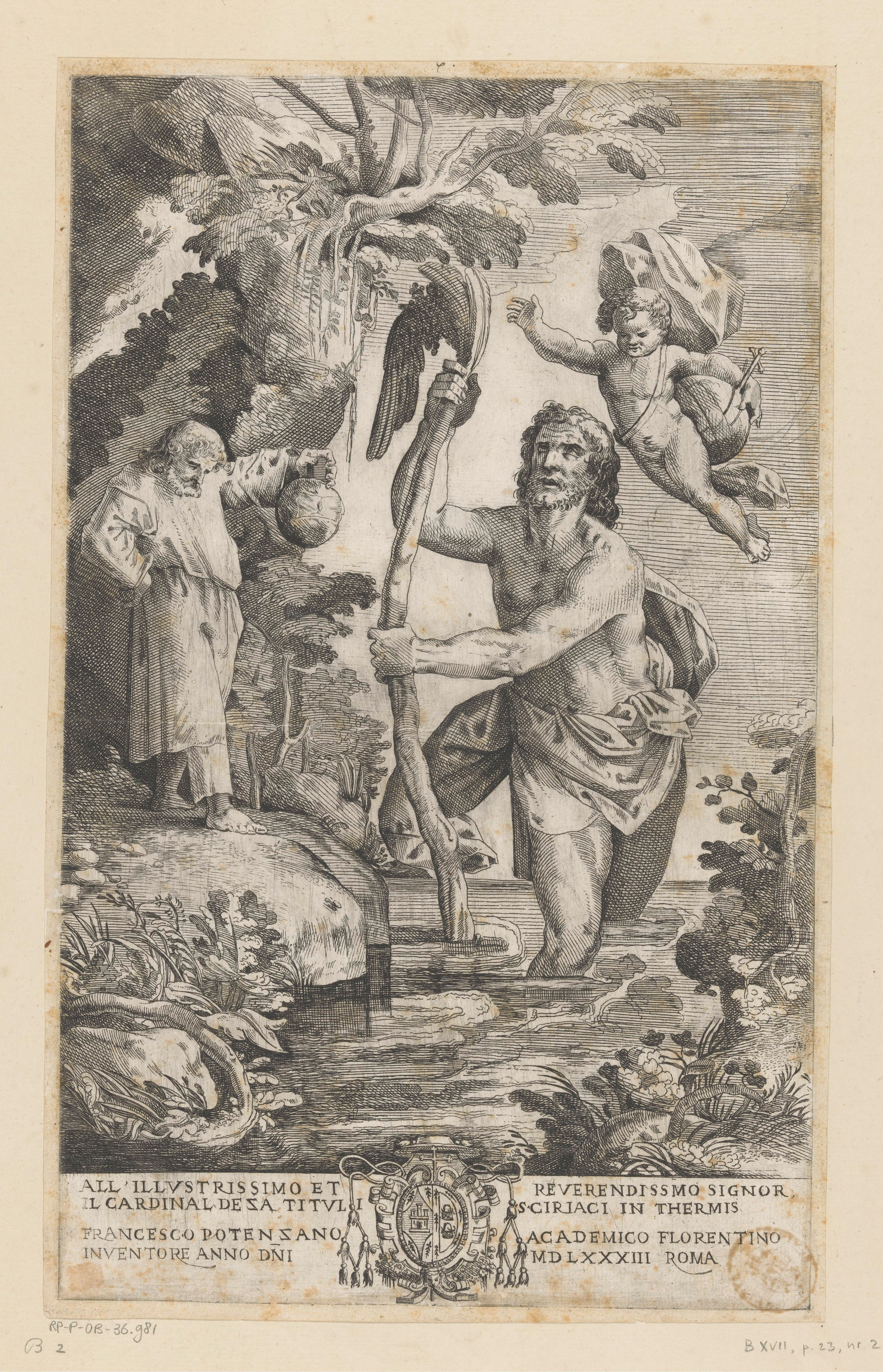
Print by Francesco Potenzano, 1583

Francesco Potenzano was an Italian painter, poet, and promoter, called The Great. He was a native of Palermo. He travelled to Rome, Naples, Malta, and through a large part of Spain. He died in 1599.
