= Cristoforo de Predis =

Italian miniaturist and illuminator

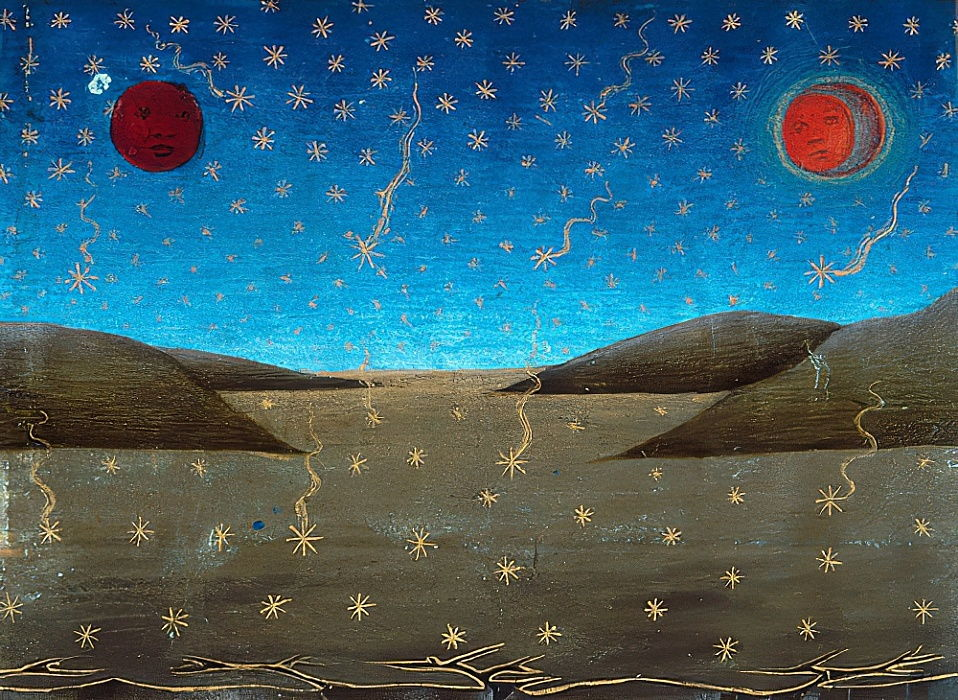
Death of the Sun, Moon and Stars Falling by Cristoforo de Predis, illustration from 'Stories of St. Joachim, St. Anne, ... ", Royal Library of Turin

Cristoforo de Predis (1440–1486), was an Italian miniaturist and illuminator.

== Biography ==
Cristoforo is part of the de Predis family of artists, where he was one of six brothers, including Giovanni. He was born deaf and mute, in the parish of San Vincenzo in Prato to parents Leonardo de Predis and Margaret Giussani. The de Predis family hosted Leonardo da Vinci when he visited Milan for the commission Virgin of the Rocks, and Leonardo met Cristoforo on that occasion. Leonardo later wrote about what can be learned from deaf people in his treatise on painting Codex Urbinas.

There are four known works of de Predis, based on his signature. Records indicate de Predis was commissioned by the Borromeo family to produce the Borromeo Book of Hours.
