= Madonna and Child with Saints James the Great and Jerome (Cima) =

Painting by Cima da Conegliano

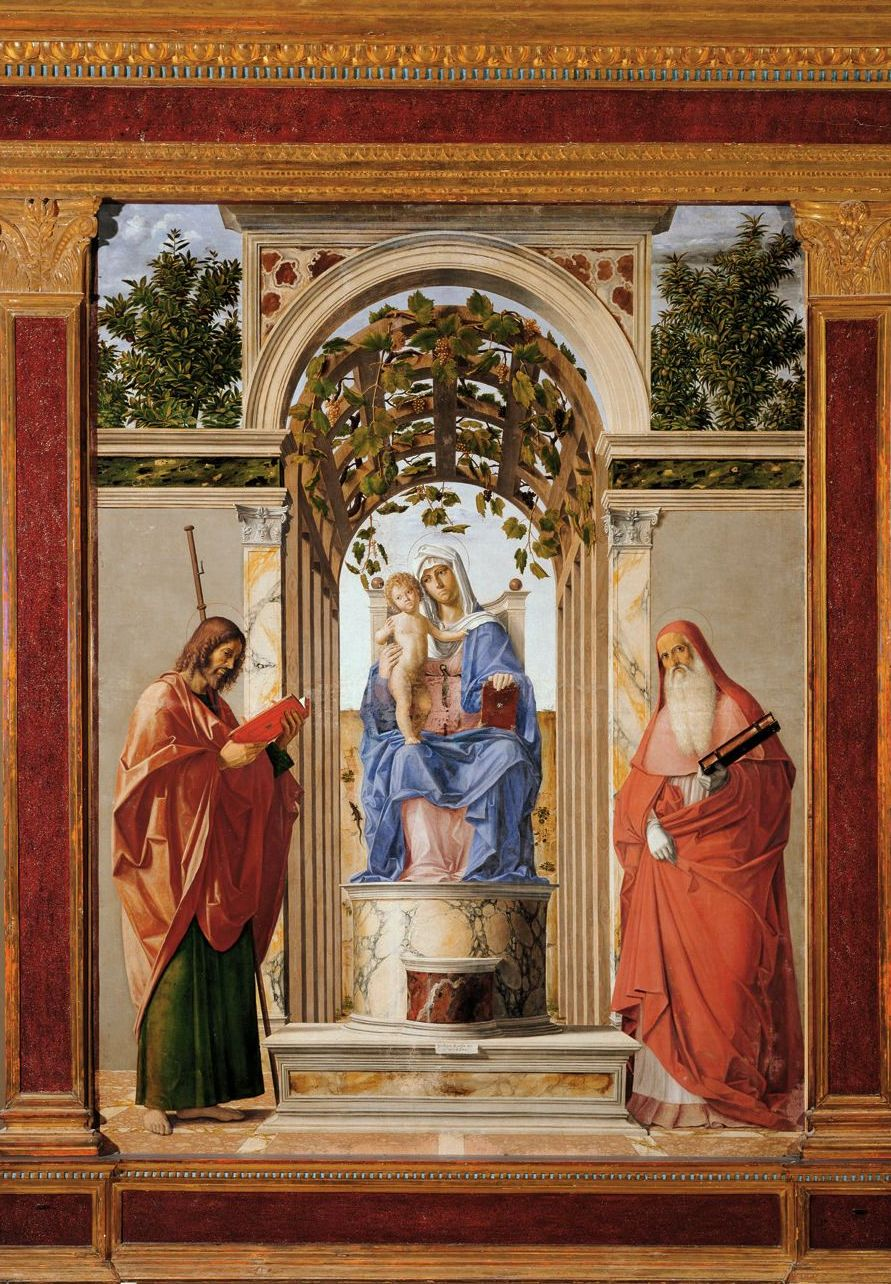
Madonna and Child Enthroned with Saint James and Saint Jerome (1489) by Cima da Conegliano

Madonna and Child Enthroned with Saint James and Saint Jerome is a 1489 oil painting by Cima da Conegliano, originally painted on panel and later transferred to canvas. It shows James the Great and Jerome either side of an enthroned Madonna and Child and now hangs in the Pinacoteca civica in Vicenza, housed in the Palazzo Chiericati.

It was originally commissioned by brothers Jacopo and Girolamo Sangiovanni for the second chapel on the north side of the nave of San Bortolo (a local name for Saint Bartholomew) in Vicenza, an annex to the now-lost Lateran monastery also dedicated to that saint. After producing several preparatory drawings, the artist painted the work in his studio in Venice before sending it to Vicenza. It is signed and dated of 1 May 1489 but draws on the triangular composition of sacra conversazione popular in Venice from 1475 onwards, the year of Antonello da Messina's San Cassiano Altarpiece.
