= Madonna and Child Enthroned with Two Male Saints =

Painting by Cima da Conegliano

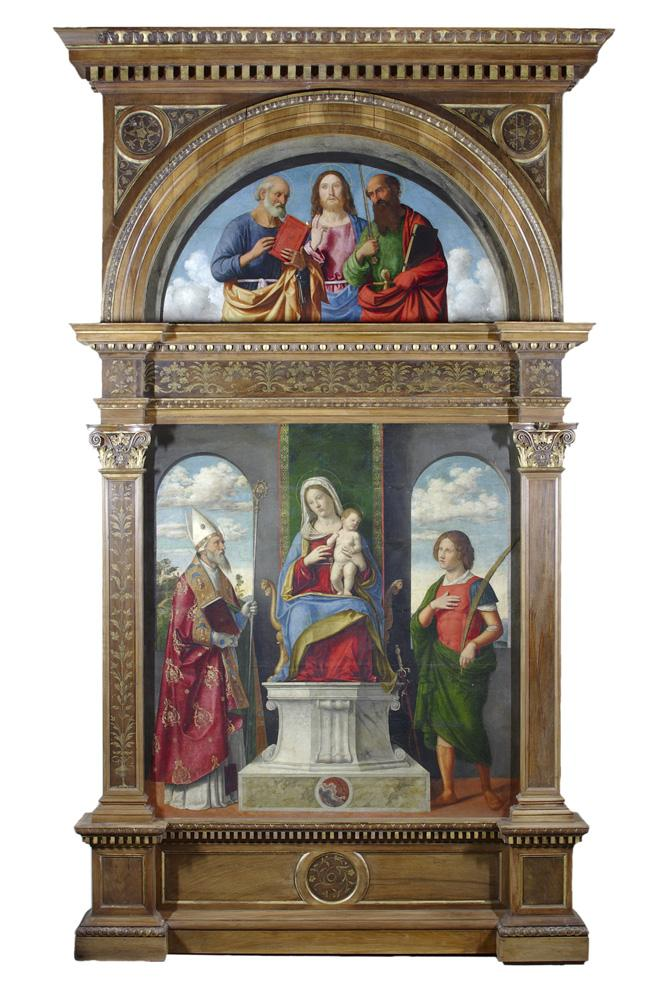
Madonna and Child Enthroned with Two Male Saints (1489) by Cima da Conegliano

Madonna and Child Enthroned with Two Male Saints is a 1489 oil-on-panel painting by the Italian Renaissance painter Cima da Conegliano, previously owned by the church of San Dionisio in the Zermen district of Feltre and now in the Museo Civico in that town.

== Identification ==
The cymatium at the top shows Jesus between Saint Peter and Saint Paul. The saints in the main panel Denis on the left and a martyr with a palm on the right, but it is not known for certain who the latter is - the museum itself identifies him as Victor, but the Fondazione Federico Zeri catalogue has him as Eleutherius.
