= Jacopino Scipioni =

Italian painter

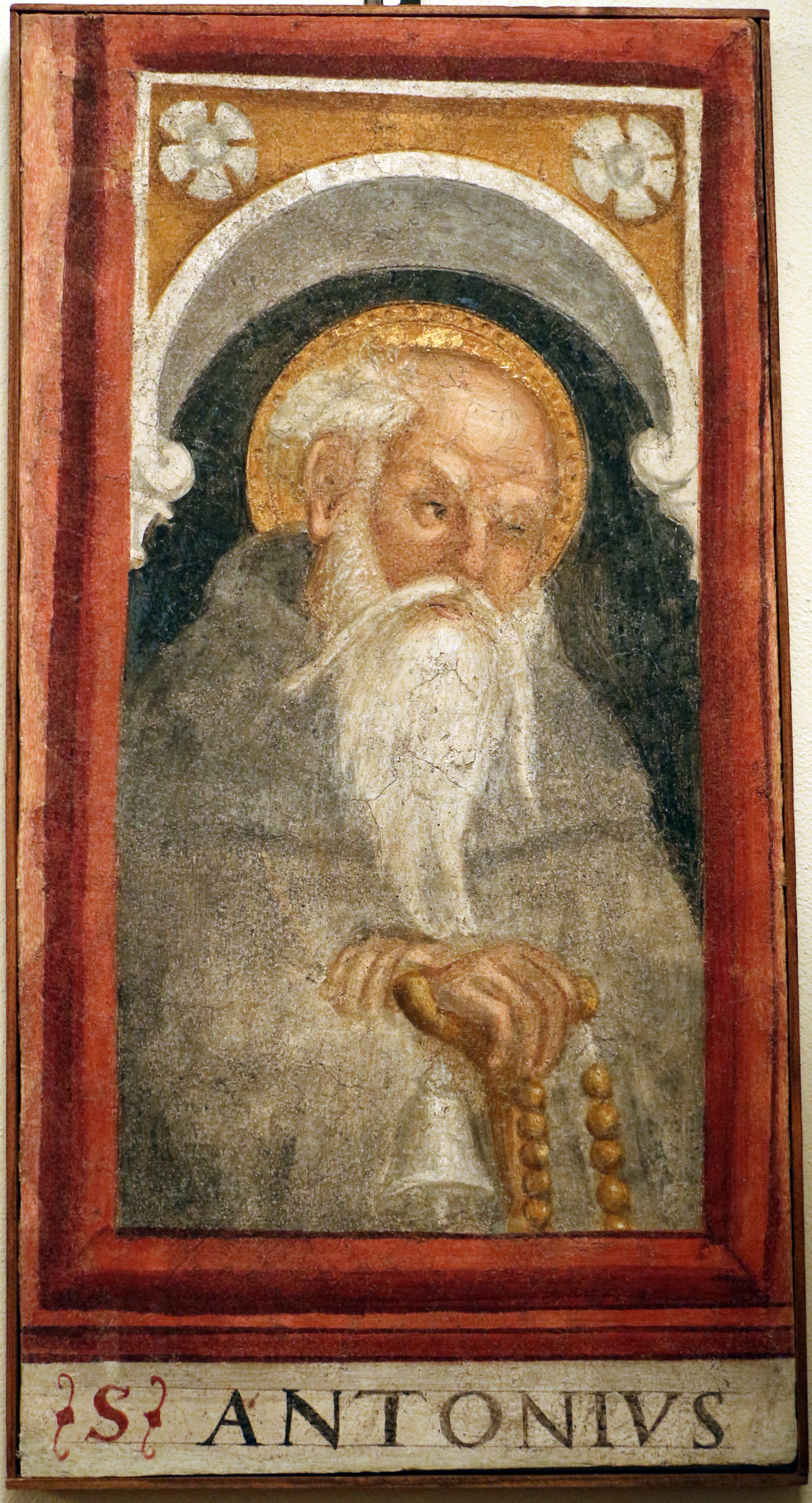

Jacopino Scipioni (c.1470 – 1532) was an Italian painter of the late 15th century active in Bergamo.

He was born in Averara, but few details are known of his life. He began painting in the studio of his brother Battista Scipioni. In 1492, the painted the ceiling of the sacristy of Santa Maria Maggiore in Bergamo. With Jacopino painting figures. In 1494, he frescoed the church, now razed, of Santa Maria delle Grazie in Bergamo, with the story of St Francis of Assisi. He also worked for the church of San Stefano, and the chapel of San Marco in the convent of Sant'Agostino, and the church of San Domenico al Fortino.
