= Alessandro Capriolo =

Italian engraver and printer

- Born: 1557; Trento
- Died: Unknown
- Occupation: Engraver

Alessandro Capriolo was an engraver and printer who was born in the Holy Roman Empire and lived part of his life in the Papal States.

He was born in Trento in about 1557, but moved to Rome in 1580 to become a printer. He engraved an Assumption based on a fresco by Zuccari, a Mary Magdalen based on a design of the Flemish painter and draughtsman Maerten de Vos, and others.

== Sources ==
- Boni, Filippo de' (1852). Biografia degli artisti ovvero dizionario della vita e delle opere dei pittori, degli scultori, degli intagliatori, dei tipografi e dei musici di ogni nazione che fiorirono da'tempi più remoti sino á nostri giorni. Seconda Edizione.. Venice; Googlebooks: Presso Andrea Santini e Figlio. p. 184.
