= Ronzoni =

Ronzoni is a surname. Notable people with the surname include:

- José Perotti Ronzoni (1898–1956), Chilean sculptor
- Pietro Ronzoni (1781–1861), Italian painter

== See also ==
- Ronzoni Macaroni Company (American pasta brand)
- New World Pasta
- Ethel Ronzoni Bishop
- Luther Vandross
