= 1534 in art =

Events from the year 1534 in art.

== Events ==
- Michelangelo begins work on the fresco The Last Judgment to be painted on the altar wall of the Sistine Chapel

== Works ==
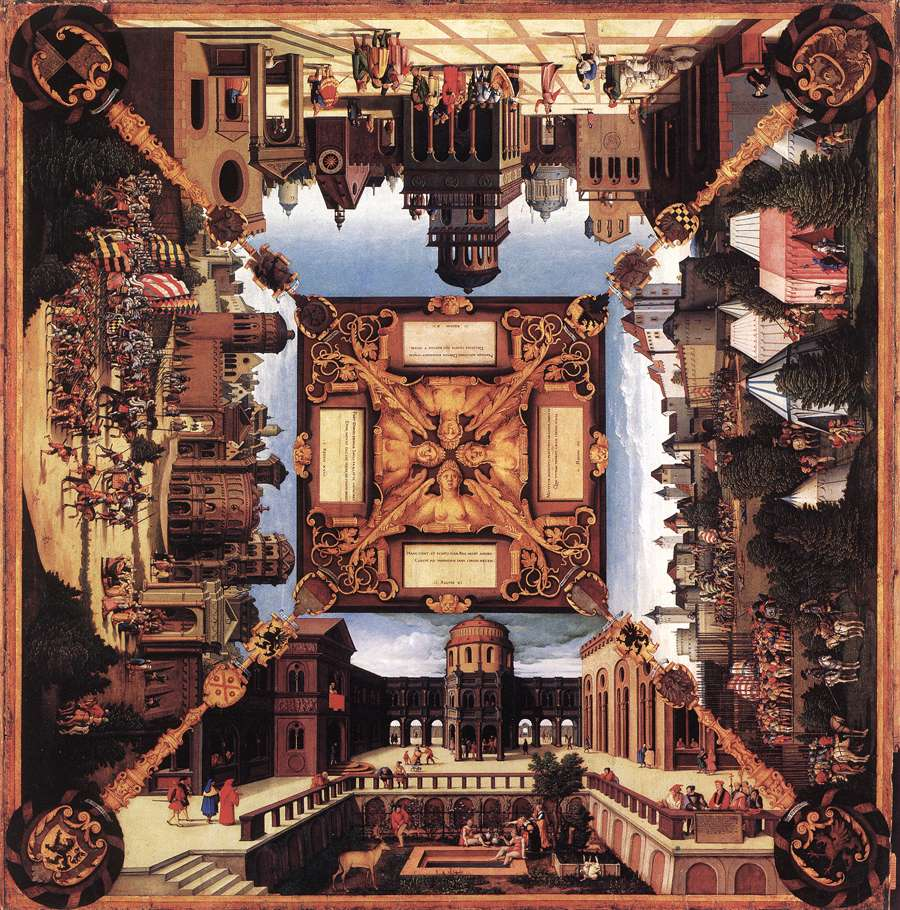
Beham – Scenes from the Life of David, Musée du Louvre

- Hans Sebald Beham – Scenes from the Life of David
- Corneille de Lyon – Portrait of a Man
- Lorenzo Lotto – Annunciation
- Bernard van Orley – Altarpiece of Calvary (Church of Our Lady, Bruges)

== Births ==
- December 16, Hans Bol, Flemish painter (died 1593)
- Lucas de Heere, Flemish Portrait painting, poet and writer (died 1584)
- Dirck Barendsz, Dutch painter who was born and died in Amsterdam (died 1592)

== Deaths ==
- March 5 - Antonio da Correggio, painter of the Parma school of the Italian Renaissance (born 1489)
- probable - Marcantonio Raimondi, Italian engraver (born 1480)
