= Xie Shichen =

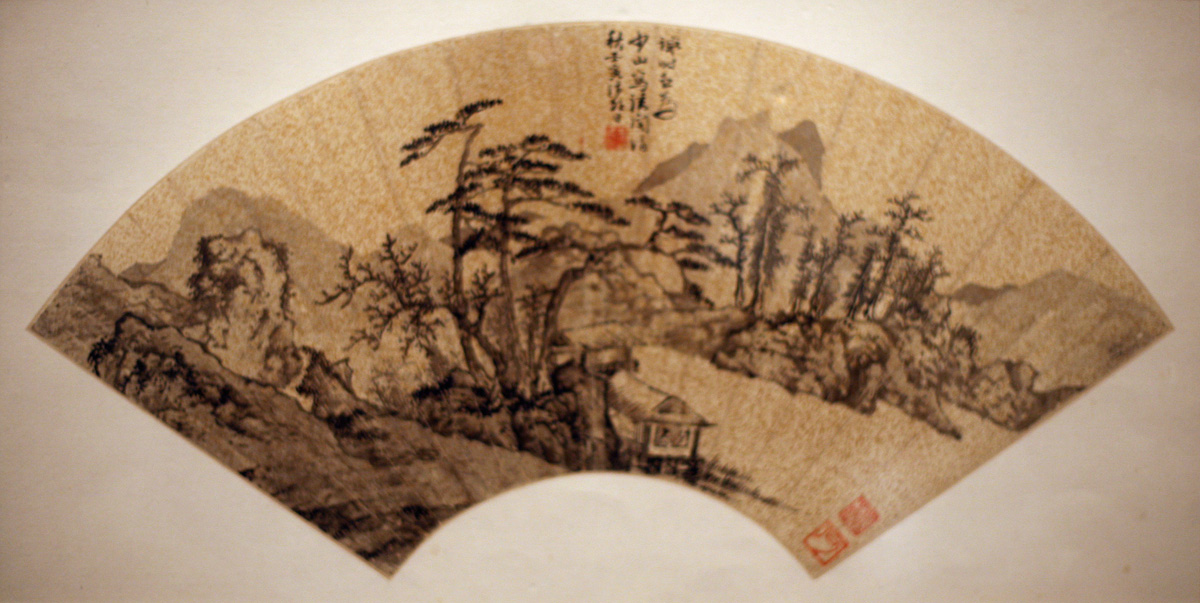
Xie Shichen, Landscape, 1542. Fan; ink on gold dusted paper. Brooklyn Museum

Xiè Shíchén (Hsieh Shih-ch'en, traditional: 謝時臣, simplified: 谢时臣); ca. (1488-unknown) was a Chinese landscape painter during the Ming dynasty (1368–1644). His specific date of death is not known.

Xie was born in Suzhou in the Jiangsu province. His style name was 'Sizhong' and his sobriquet was 'Chuxian'. Xie's landscapes followed the style of Guo Xi and Shen Zhou.
