= Bronzini =

Bronzini is an Italian surname. Notable people with the surname include:

- Andrea Bronzini (born 1997), Italian rugby union player
- Giorgia Bronzini (born 1983), Italian cyclist
- Giorgio Bronzini (born 1990), Italian rugby union player
- Giovanni Battista Bronzini (1925–2002), Italian anthropologist and historian
- Pietro Bronzini (1898–1962), Italian footballer
- Teodoro Bronzini (1888–1981), Argentine politician

== See also ==
- European seabass, also known as Bronzini
