= Bartolomeo degli Erri =

Italian painter

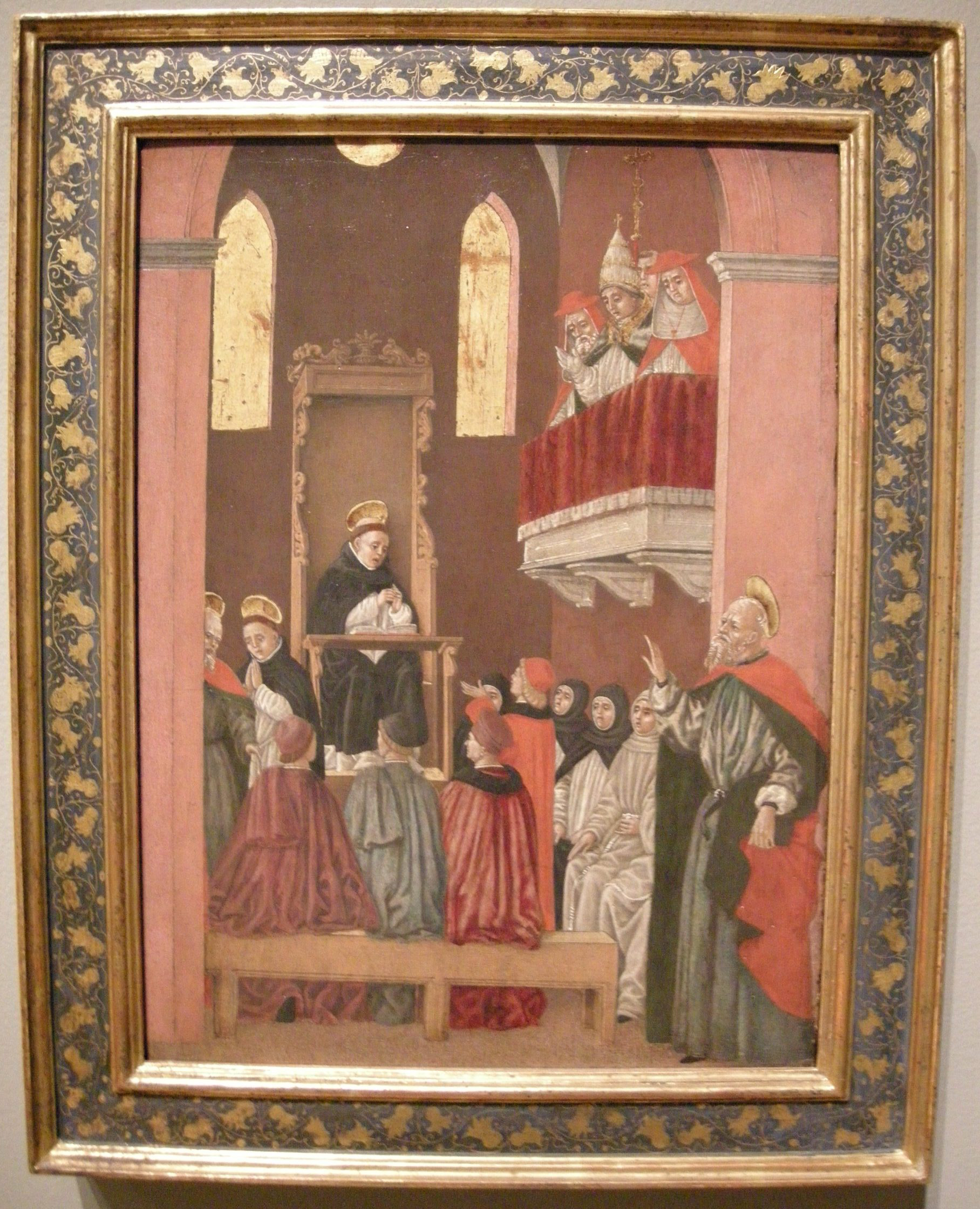
Visione di San Paolino (Vision of Saint Paulinus by Bartolomeo degli Erri, National Gallery of Art, 1465

Bartolomeo degli Erri (1447–1482) was an Italian Gothic painter of the Italian Renaissance.

Bartolomeo degli Erri, and his brothers Bartolomeo Bonascia and Agnolo are considered key figures of the Quattrocento movement in Modena. Bartolomeo probably contributed to the large triptych of the Coronation of the Virgin at the Galleria Estense (1462 and 1466) mainly attributed to his brother. The art historian Roberto Longhi also assigns a secondary interest to a series of paintings of scenes from the lives of the saints. There are tables that are probably from three dismembered altarpieces dedicated to the saints, made between 1466 and 1474 for the church of San Domenico Modena.

He also has works in various museums worldwide, including Metropolitan Museum of Art, Kunsthistorisches Museum, California Palace of the Legion of Honor, and the Galleria Estense.
