= Agnolo degli Erri =

Italian painter

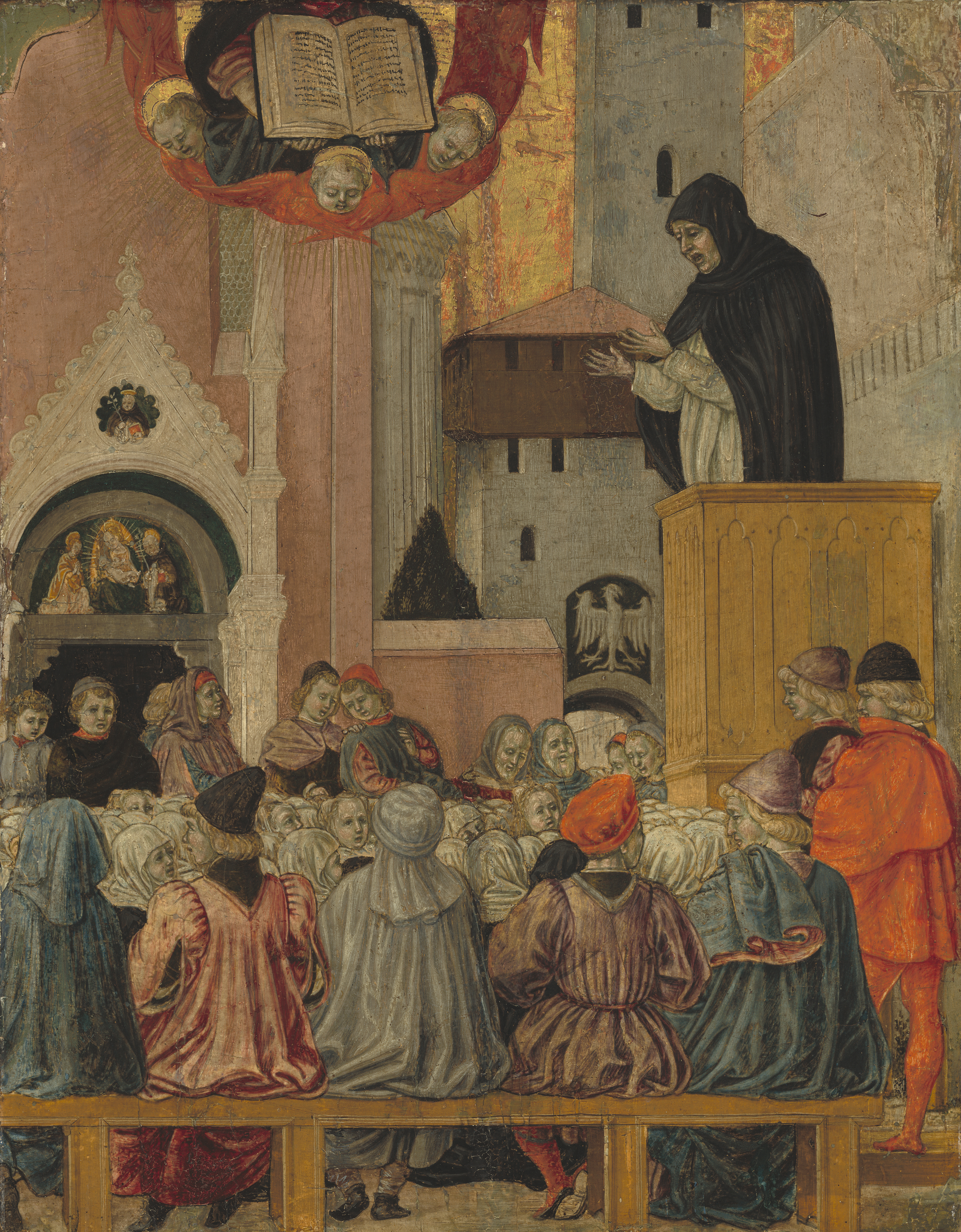
A Dominican Preaching by Agnolo degli Erri, National Gallery of Art, 1470

Agnolo degli Erri (1440–1482) was an Italian Gothic painter of the Italian Renaissance.

Agnolo degli Erri, along with his brothers Bartolomeo and Bartolomeo Bonascia, are considered key figures of the Quattrocento movement in Modena. He likely painted the triptych of the Coronation of the Virgin at the Galleria Estense (1462 and 1466). It is likely that his brother was also involved in this work. The art historian Roberto Longhi also assigns a secondary interest to a series of paintings of scenes from the lives of the saints. An altarpiece dedicated to Saint Peter from the church of San Domenico in Modena, today in the Galleria nazionale di Parma, has also been attributed to Agnolo degli Erri.
