= Hans Krafft the Elder =

German medalist

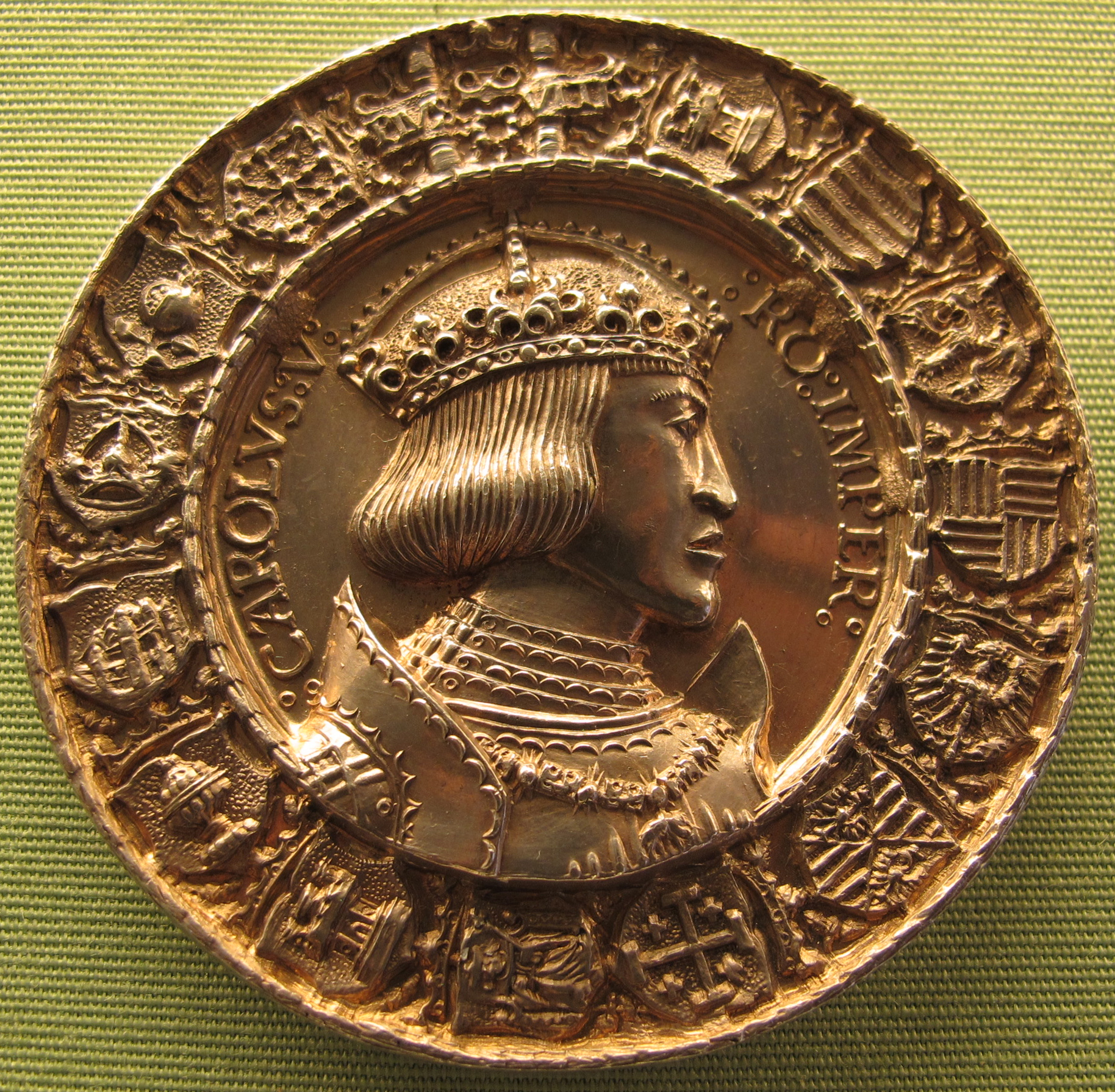
Medal of Charles V (1520-1521), drawn by Dürer

Hans Krafft the Elder (1481–c.1542) was a German medalist, and master of the Nuremberg mint. Krafft worked from designs by Albrecht Dürer and Lucas Cranach, among other artists.

A silver medal struck by Krafft of Charles V, Holy Roman Emperor sold for £258,750 in December 2009.
