= Agostino Marti =

Italian painter

Agostino Marti (1482 – after 1542/43) was an Italian painter. He flourished between 1520 and 1526.

== Biography ==
Marti lived and worked primarily in the Province of Lucca. He specialized in oil on wood paintings of religious themes. Marti has a painting Saint John Writing the Gospel in Capannori's Parish of Saint Paul (Pieve San Paolo) church. His work Madonna and Child Enthroned with Saints was painted in 1513 on commission by the Signoria di Carrara Alberico Malaspina Regolo for the church of San Francesco in Massa. Marti has a street named after him Viale Agostino Marti in the commune of Lucca.
