= Gerino da Pistoia =

Italian painter

Gerino da Pistoia, also Gerino di Antonio Gerini, (1480–1529) was an Italian painter and designer of the Renaissance.

== Biography ==
Not much is known about Gerino except through his works and a few lines by Giorgio Vasari. Gerino was a pupil of Pietro Perugino and trained in his workshop. He traveled to Rome with Pinturicchio.

The Courtauld Gallery was awarded a grant in 2011 to restore and study a surviving work of his Virgin and Child Enthroned with Saints Lawrence, John the Baptist, Monica and Augustine (1510) which was originally made for the church of Sant'Agostino in Sansepolcro.

Some of his works include:

- Madonna with St. Michael and St. Peter, in the annex to the oratory of the church of San Alessandro in Milan
- Madonna (1502), painted relief, Museo Civico, Sansepolcro
- San Jacopo, Basilica of Our Lady of Humility
- Madonna and Child with Saints Anthony Abbot and Nicolas of Bari, church San Giorgio a Porciano, Lamporecchio
- Miracle of the Loaves and Fishes (1513), fresco in dining hall of the convent San Lucchese, Poggibonsi
- St Jerome Penitent, Museum of the Cathedral of San Zeno, Pistoia
- Franciscan saints, fifty medallions by Gerino and his students (1501–1509), corridor of the convent of the sanctuary of Chiusi della Verna
