= Timeline of art =

Chronological history of the visual arts by year and decade

This page indexes the individual year in art pages; see also art periods. This list is exclusively for the visual arts; for music, see Timeline of musical events.

Prehistoric – 1000s – 1010s – 1020s – 1030s – 1040s – 1050s – 1060s – 1070s – 1080s – 1090s – 1100s – 1110s – 1120s – 1130s – 1140s – 1150s – 1160s – 1170s – 1180s – 1190s – 1200s – 1210s – 1220s – 1230s – 1240s – 1250s – 1260s – 1270s – 1280s – 1290s – 1300s – 1310s – 1320s – 1330s – 1340s – 1350s – 1360s – 1370s – 1380s – 1390s – 1400s – 1410s – 1420s – 1430s – 1440s – 1450s – 1460s – 1470s – 1480s – 1490s – 1500s – 1510s – 1520s – 1530s – 1540s – 1550s – 1560s – 1570s – 1580s – 1590s – 1600s – 1610s – 1620s – 1630s – 1640s – 1650s – 1660s – 1670s – 1680s – 1690s – 1700s – 1710s – 1720s – 1730s – 1740s – 1750s – 1760s – 1770s – 1780s – 1790s – 1800s – 1810s – 1820s – 1830s – 1840s – 1850s – 1860s – 1870s – 1880s – 1890s – 1900s – 1910s – 1920s – 1930s – 1940s – 1950s – 1960s – 1970s – 1980s – 1990s – 2000s – 2010s – 2020s

== 2020s ==
- 2026 in art - Death of Molly Parkin, Daniel Pelletti, Hiroshi Nakamura, Beatriz González, Scott Adams, Alfred Grimm, Philip Leider, Valentino, Linda Kohen, Marian Goodman, Praski Vitti, Eric Cameron, Lorenza Trucchi, Dóra Maurer, Henrike Naumann, Roger von Gunten, Isaiah Zagar, Peter Stämpfli, Iris Cantor, Liliana Angulo Cortés, Ulysses Jenkins, Stephen Koch, Giancarlo Politi, Ioanna Papantoniou, Eugènia Balcells, Pockets Warhol, Pedro Friedeberg, Thaddeus Mosley, Umberto Allemandi, Jean-François Boclé, Calvin Tomkins, Pat Steir, Glen Baxter, Melvin Edwards, Mike Chaplin, Pearl Fryar, Thomas Zipp, Melchor Peredo, Gabor Szilasi, Celeste Dupuy-Spencer, James Hayward, Randall Bourscheidt, Desmond Morris, Vuokko Nurmesniemi, George Herms. Georg Baselitz, Ben Morea, José María Cruz Novillo, Manuela Hoelterhoff, Bruno Bischofberger, Mary Lovelace O'Neal, Vladimir Ovchinnikov, Valie Export, Harald Metzkes, Silvio Benedetto, Arleen Schloss, Tess Jaray, Alan Saret, Jay Milder, Julio Le Parc, Charles Hinman, Matthew Spender, John Loring, Duane Michals, David Hockney, Portchie, Danny Simmons, Wulf Herzogenrath, Yaacov Agam, Konstantin Khudyakov, Mustafa Monwar, Kurt Ard, Luisa Cunha, Edward Lucie-Smith, Pat Oliphant, Juan Carlos Distéfano, Milan Knížák, Betye Saar, Simone Forti, Jonathan Leo Fairbanks, Tomás Parra, Christian Bernard, Mary Heilmann, Yayoi Kusama, Jay Maisel, Franco Fontana, Helch, David Thauberger, Geles Cabrera, Brian Fallon, Walter Kershaw, Lucien Smith, Aracy Amaral, Peter Max, Graciela Taquini, Carlos Alonso, Vladimír Kopecký, Karel Zelenko, Oscar Reynert Olsen, Alisa Aksyonova, Masako Watanabe, Stephen Jones, Peter Nagy, Luigi Malice, Jogen Chowdhury, Rudi Fuchs, Victor Anicet, Italo Zannier, Ursula von Rydingsvard, Tony Berlant, Pipo Nguyen-duy, Miquel Navarro, John Killacky, Fred Forest, Vezhdi Rashidov, Rita Paul, Laura Lee Brown, Peter Iden, Pierre Bellocq, Ray Tintori, Luis Y. Aragón, Friedrich Christian Flick
- 2025 in art - Death of La Chunga, Ed Askew, Peter Brandes, Elisabeth Haarr, Philippa Blair, Leo Segedin, Alastair MacKinven, Oliviero Toscani, David Lynch, George A. Tice, Jules Feiffer, Aaron De Groft, Jo Baer, Håkon Bleken, Renina Katz, Rutherford Chang, Jaune Quick-to-See Smith, Graham Nickson, Lim Tze Peng, Waldo Díaz-Balart, Satoru Abe, Walter Robinson, Mustafa Arruf, Kay Smith, Mel Bochner, Frankétienne, Ming Fay, Carol Sutton, Jack Vettriano, Fred Eversley, Peter Sedgley, Anita Huffington, Joe Goode, Asaf Lifshitz, Abdul Karim Al-Orrayed, Marcia Marcus, Max Kozloff, Luis Felipe Noé, Chuck Connelly, Elaine Wynn, Art Green, Guy Ullens, Ita Aber, Zurab Tsereteli, Peter Sarkisian, Suki Seokyeong Kang, Dara Birnbaum, Julia Alexander, Ana Pellicer, André Rouillé, Koyo Kouoh, William Luers, Yasunao Tone, Eva, Tor Kvarv, Sebastião Salgado, Claude Roussel, Alenka Kham Pičman, Bedřich Dlouhý, Hugo Zapata, Daniel Lelong, Graham Gund, Gunther Uecker, Henk van Os, Joel Shapiro, Leonard Lauder, Thornton Willis, Marcia Resnick, Arnaldo Pomodoro, Pat Williams, Peter Hutchinson, Brian Clarke, Radomir Damnjanović Damnjan, Hamiduzzaman Khan, David Adickes, Raymond Saunders, Lena Cronqvist, Robert Wilson, Amnon Barzel, Walter Swennen, Amalia Del Ponte, Humberto Calzada, Eduard Carbonell i Esteller, Esther Grether, Rosalyn Drexler, Robert Grosvenor, Norman Toynton, Agnes Gund, Bryan Kneale, Juraj Bartusz, Jørgen Leth, Takako Saito, Milton Esterow, Ken Jacobs, Frank Wimberley, Pepe Soho, Drew Struzan, Claes Hake, Ed Kerns, Zbyšek Sion, Jackie Ferrara, Mimmo Jodice, Koko Komégné, Allison Knowles, Elspeth King, Giorgio Forattini, Sasha Okun, Dorothy Vogel, Timothy App, Ronald Davis, Llyn Foulkes, Frank Gehry, Wolfgang Petrick, Martin Parr, Arthur L. Carter, Ceal Floyer, Janet Fish, Paul de Nooijer, Rosa von Praunheim, Oscar Allain, Ram V. Sutar, Robert Mnuchin, Sigmund Abeles, Anne Mdden Gathie Falk, Amos Poe, Margarete Palz, Walter Steding
- 2024 in art - Death of Hartmut Ritzerfeld, Alexis Smith, Kishin Shinoyama, Brent Sikkema, Robert Whitman, Carl Andre, Ricardo Pascale, Brian Griffin, Peter Golfinopoulos, Antonio Paolucci, Helga Paris, Melvin Way, Andrew Crispo, A. Ramachandran, Günter Brus, Aleš Lamr, Marc Pachter, Steve Paxton. Félix Aráuz, Iris Apfel, Pigcasso, Lucas Samaras, Akira Toriyama, Imogen Stuart, Robert Moskowitz. Richard Serra, Katsura Funakoshi, Marian Zazeela, Quisqueya Henríquez, Gaetano Pesce, Italo Rota, Ziraldo, Patti Astor, Trina Robbins, Faith Ringgold, Jean-Marie Haessle, Au Ho-nien, Zack Norman, Frank Stella, David Shapiro, Barbara Stauffacher Solomon, Katherine Porter, Joe Zucker, Roberta Marrero, Marc Camille Chaimowicz, John Boardman, Valery Chtak, Sanford L. Smith, Bertien van Manen, Jan van Munster, Ben Vautier, Lyons Brown Jr., Guy Warren, Barbara Gladstone, Sir John Boardman, Martin Mull, Audrey Flack, Jacqueline de Jong, Manuel Cargaleiro, June Leaf, Dorothy Lichtenstein, Thomas Hoepker, Bill Viola, André Juillard, Kasper König, Simon Verity, Jeremy Gilbert-Rolfe, Jaime Botín, Bill Beckley, David Anfam, Leonard Riggio, Ēvī Upeniece, Hans Danuser, Jacqueline Winsor, Derek Boshier, Rebecca Horn, Peter Klashorst, Mary McFadden, Fred Nall Hollis, James Magee, Norman Ackroyd, Eikoh Hosoe, Valentinas Antanavičius, Ivan Vukadinov, Richard Mayhew, Lillian Schwartz, Andrew Stahl, Patricia Johanson, Isabelle de Borchgrave, Robert C. Morgan, Gary Indiana, Paul Morrissey, Elisabeth Ohlson Wallin, Daniel Spoerri Frank Auerbach, David R. Prentice, Walter Dahn, Tom Forrestall, Eunice Parsons, Vojo Stanić, Cynthia Zukas, Breyten Breytenbach, Rafig Nasirov, Raghnall Ó Floinn, Lorraine O'Grady, Jodhaiya Bai Baiga, Juan Cárdenas, Rezki Zerarti, Yoshio Taniguchi, Roberto Esteban Chavez, Zilia Sánchez Domínguez, Kurt Laurenz Metzler, Alfredo Prior, Marie-Claude Beaud, Jocelyn Wildenstein, Pippa Garner
- 2023 in art - Death of Marilyn Stafford, Zhou Lingzhao, Lyuben Zidarov, Karim Bennani, Michael Snow, George S. Zimbel, Hans Belting, Nicola Zamboni, Alfred Leslie, Jesse Treviño, Ángela Gurría, Ans Westra, Mary Bauermeister, Camille Souter, Rafael Viñoly, Lou Stovall, Piero Gilardi, Ian Falconer, Phyllida Barlow, Francisco Rodón, Shamim Sikder, James Harithas, Vivan Sundaram, Myriam Ullens, Neal Boenzi, Ted Bonin, Al Jaffee, John Olsen, Eberhard Kornfeld, Ed Koren, Harold Riley, Ju Ming, Yvonne Jacquette, Frank Kozik, Kenneth Anger, Roy Lerner, Dorothy Knowles, Jorrit Tornquist, Ilya Kabakov, Hans-Peter Feldmann, Françoise Gilot, Graziano Origa, Cora Cohen, Khosrow Hassanzadeh, Jan Sierhuis, Joop Sanders, Ales Pushkin, Fazil Najafov, Rubén Martínez Bulnes, Tony Bennett, Jesse Lott, Oswaldo Viteri, Giorgio Di Genova, Didier Lourenço, David Le Batard, Konrad Klapheck, Jamie Reid, Brice Marden, Claude Picasso, Mario Costa, Lisa Lyon, Fernando Botero, Erwin Olaf, Park Seo-bo, Gastón Ugalde, Juanita McNeely, Eduardo Arranz-Bravo, Ida Applebroog, Robert Irwin, Gord Smith, Joe Tilson, Radcliffe Bailey, Rob Krier, Larry Fink, William Anastasi, Wolfgang Hollegha, Paul Dibble, Vera Molnár, Graziella Magherini, Richard Hunt, Giovanni Anselmo, Imroz, William Pope.L, Martha Diamond
- 2022 in art - Death of Craig Ruddy, Ricardo Bofill, Tova Berlinski, Alekos Fassianos, Hossein Valamanesh, Andrei Mudrea, James Bidgood, Dan Lacey, John Wesley, Carmen Herrera, John Scott, Dan Graham, Marino Golinelli, DeWain Valentine, Srihadi Soedarsono, Antonio Seguí, Nick Zedd, Conrad Janis, Albert Kresch, Budi Tek, Sven Lukin, Mira Calix, Ted Mooney, Patrick Demarchelier, Eleanor Munro, Donald Baechler, Jerry Uelsmann, Hermann Nitsch, Cynthia Plaster Caster, Lewis Stein, Marcus Leatherdale, Enoch Kelly Haney, Ron Galella, Suzi Gablik, Enrique Metinides, Knox Martin, Bob Neuwirth, Miss.Tic, David Datuna, Samella Lewis, Claude Rutault Christopher Pratt, Jacques Villeglé, Paula Rego, Tarek Al-Ghoussein, Heidi Horten, Duncan Hannah, Juan Pablo Echeverri, Harvey Dinnerstein, Arnold Skolnick, Sam Gilliam, Margaret Keane, David Blackwood, Matt King, Lily Safra, Maya Attoun, Claes Oldenburg, Emilie Benes Brzezinski, Jennifer Bartlett, Mary Obering, Velichko Minekov, Issey Miyake, Natalia LL, Marta Palau Bosch, Dmitri Vrubel, Oliver Frey, Lily Renée, Charlie Finch, Jens Birkemose, Virginia Dwan, James Polshek, Jean-Luc Godard. Roxanne Lowit, Bill Hutson, Brigida Baltar, Billy Al Bengston, Grace Glueck, Harold Garde, Angus Trumble, Jüri Arrak, Jagoda Buić, Peter Schjeldahl, Rodney Graham, Laila Shawa, Pierre Soulages, Clark Murray, Nicholas Harding, Brian O'Doherty, Lee Bontecou, Hervé Télémaque, Tom Phillips, Ashley Bickerton, Larry Qualls, Ronald Sherr, Judith Lauand, Philip Pearlstein, Maya Widmaier-Picasso, Franz Gertsch, Dorothy Iannone, Arata Isozaki, Tony Vaccaro, Sven Lukin
- 2021 in art - Death of Jan de Bie, Kim Tschang-yeul, Arik Brauer, Barry Le Va, Forrest Moses, Cindy Nemser, Bill Hammond, Luis Feito, James Bishop, Arturo Di Modica, Alan Bowness, Toko Shinoda, Barbara Ess, Duggie Fields, Elsa Peretti, Jean-Michel Sanejouand, Gianluigi Colalucci, Jean Dupuy, Mary Beth Edelson, Hans Rasmus Astrup, William T. Wiley, Eli Broad, Julião Sarmento, Susanna Heller, Richard Nonas, Alain Kirili, Ingvar Cronhammar, Roser Bru, Dani Karavan, Judith Godwin, Jane Kaufman, Douglas S. Cramer, Tomás Llorens, Allen Midgette, Mogens Møller, Gérard Fromanger, Arnold Odermatt, Diego Cortez, Arturo Schwarz, Joseph Raffael, Christian Boltanski, Louise Fishman, Phillip King, Nancy Frankel, Ben Wagin, Yolanda López, Stanislav Hanzík, K. Schippers, Chuck Close, Yusuf Grillo, Billy Apple, Sylvano Bussotti, Achille Pace, Lars Vilks, Julie L. Green, Margo Leavin, Paul Blanca, Manuel Neri, Nyapanyapa Yunupingu, Lía Bermúdez, Patrick Reyntiens, Iran Darroudi, Raoul Middleman, Bettina Grossman, Dave Hickey, Etel Adnan, Jimmie Durham, Mick Rock, Carlo Maria Mariani, Rita Letendre, Robert Bly, Virgil Abloh, Guillermo Roux, Lawrence Weiner, Eve Babitz, Richard Rogers, Wayne Thiebaud, Sabine Weiss
- 2020 in art - Death of John Baldessari, Akbar Padamsee, André Lufwa, Oswald Oberhuber, James Mollison, Hester Diamond, Jason Polan. Beverly Pepper, Anne Windfohr Marion, Jack Youngerman, Peter Dreher, Ulay, John Seward Johnson II, Wolf Kahn, Paul Kasmin, Maurice Berger, Idelle Weber, Dr. Evermor, Anne Hendricks Bass, David Driskell, Alexander Thynn, Helene Aylon, Daniel Greene, Mort Drucker, Gillian Wise, William H. Bailey, Glenna Goodacre, Markus Raetz, Peter Beard, Tina Girouard, Zarina, Germano Celant, Michael McClure, Iepe Rubingh, Cliff Eyland, Susan Rothenberg, Richard Anuszkiewicz, Emma Amos, Peter Alexander, Gracia Barrios, Christo, Manuel Felguérez, Luther Price, Anna Blume, Milton Glaser, Benedetto Robazza, Frank Popper, George Simon, Brigid Berlin, Keith Sonnier, Lotty Rosenfeld, Miodrag Živković, Abdul Hay Mosallam Zarara, Frank Wright, William Arnett, Luchita Hurtado, Pierre-Yves Trémois, Fern Cunningham, Ron Gorchov, Mrinal Haque, Pedro de Oraá, Douglas MacDiarmid, Siah Armajani, Jürgen Schadeberg, Philippe Daverio, Pierre Nahon, Franco Maria Ricci, Donald Kendall, Robert Bechtle, Kenzo Takada, Geoffrey Dyer, Jean Cardot, Chris Killip, David Geiser, Lea Vergine, Diane Di Prima, Mohammed Melehi, Sindika Dokolo, Piero Simondo, Aldo Tambellini, Sheldon Solow, Daniel Cordier, Helen LaFrance, Suh Se-ok, Jackie Saccoccio, James Havard, Barbara Rose, David Medalla

== 2010s ==
- 2019 in art - Death of Francine du Plessix Gray, John Mason, Jonas Mekas, Susan Hiller, Robert Ryman, Alessandro Mendini, Marella Angelli, Kevin Roche, Carolee Schneemann, Martín Chirino, Sir John Richardson, Okwui Enwezor, Luca Alinari, Barbara Hammer, Hedi Turki, Jacqueline Lichtenstein, Claude Lalanne, Monir Shahroudy Farmanfarmaian, Jayne Wrightsman, Mavis Pusey, Ben Heller Thomas Nozkowski, Lutz Bacher, Nobuo Sekine, Jamil Naqsh, I.M. Pei, Lawrence Carroll, Everett Kinstler, Tony DeLap, Joe Overstreet, Adela Neffa, Joyce Pensato, Maryon Kantaroff, Martin Roth, Suzan Pitt, Charles Ginnever, Robert Therrien, Gloria Vanderbilt, Peter Selz, Sascha Pohflepp, David Koloane, Leon Kossoff, Douglas Crimp, Steve Cannon, Frieder Burda, Marisa Merz, Carlos Cruz-Diez, Nancy Reddin Kienholz, Wang Guodong, Peter Lindbergh, Francisco Toledo, Robert Frank, Daniel Johnston, Huguette Caland, Matthew Wong, John Giorno, Ettore Spalletti, E. A. Carmean, Charles Jencks, Adolfo Mexiac, Stefan Edlis, Edward Clark, Huang Yong Ping, Gilberto Aceves Navarro, Rina Lazo, Manoucher Yektai, Johann Eyfells, May Stevens, Ken Heymann, Emily Mason, PHASE 2, Panamarenko, Alasdair Gray, Syd Mead, Oliviero Leonardi
- 2018 in art - Death of Mauro Staccioli, Betty Woodman, Vladimir Yankilevsky, Carlo Pedretti, Kynaston McShine, William Scharf, Ed Moses, Jack Whitten, Robert Pincus-Witten, Sonia Gechtoff, Frank Gaylord, Gillian Ayres, Marcia Hafif, Per Kirkeby, Tom Wolfe, Robert Indiana, Alan Bean, Gregg Juarez, Malcolm Morley, Irving Sandler, Michaele Vollbracht, David Goldblatt. Sabina Ott, Krishna Reddy, Paul Taylor, Irving Petlin, Tchan Fou-li, Annette Michelson, Robert Venturi, Geta Brătescu, Henry Wessel Jr., Jane Fortune, Helena Almeida, Milton Gendel,.Mel Ramos, Paul Allen, Jacques Monory, Harold Stevenson, Karl-Heinz Adler, Stan Lee, Lubomir Tomaszewski, Peter Peryer, Robert Morris, Vivian Lynn, Enrico Crispolti, Wendy Beckett, Jean Dumontier
- 2017 in art - Death of John Berger, Antony Armstrong-Jones, 1st Earl of Snowdon, Ciel Bergman, Charles Recher, Moshe Gershuni, Dore Ashton, Harvey Lichtenstein, Jannis Kounellis, Sofia Imber, Fritz Koenig, Ren Hang, Gustav Metzger, Howard Hodgkin, Trisha Brown, David Rockefeller, George Woodman, Mirella Bentivoglio, Julian Stanczak, James Rosenquist, Glenn O'Brien, Barkley L. Hendricks, Magdalena Abakanowicz, Vito Acconci, A. R. Penck, Michael Zwack, Jack Tilton, Felipe Ehrenberg, Marie Cosindas, Trento Longaretti, Edit DeAk, Khadija Saye, Olbram Zoubek, Hans Breder, José Luis Cuevas, Lala Rukh, Kenneth Jay Lane, Arlene Gottfried, John Ashberry, Arno Rink, Pierre Bergé, Pete Turner, David Shepherd, Eleanore Mikus, Robert Delpire, Holly Block, Fernando de Szyszlo, Richard Hambleton, Linda Nochlin, Trevor Bell, Frans Krajcberg, Enrico Castellani, Ivan Chermayeff, Lewis Manilow, Tim Rollins
- 2016 in art - Death of David Bowie, Thornton Dial, Charles Garabedian, Douglas Haynes, Bernard Kirschenbaum, Zaha Hadid, Richard Smith, Charles Gatewood, Marisol Escobar, Louisa Chase, Bill Berkson, Kenworth Moffett, Tony Feher, Bill Cunningham, Ben Patterson, Billy Name, Nathan Lyons, Ralph Goings, Shirley Jaffe, Walter Darby Bannard, Elaine Lustig Cohen, Klaus Kertess, David Antin, Leonard Cohen, Kenneth Snelson, Tyrus Wong
- 2015 in art - Death of Milton Hebald, Jane Wilson, Walter Liedtke, John C. Whitehead, Tomie Ohtake, Sheila Girling, Carel Visser, William King, Michael Graves, Bodys Isek Kingelez, Paule Anglim, Sargy Mann, Lars Tunbjörk, Judith Malina, Menashe Kadishman, Chris Burden, Rachel Rosenthal, Rosemarie Castoro, Mary Ellen Mark, Miriam Schapiro, David Aronson, Ingrid Sischy, Sally Gross, Melva Bucksbaum, Nelson Shanks, John Perreault, Brian Sewell, Paul Reed, Wojciech Fangor, Holly Woodlawn, George Earl Ortman, Ellsworth Kelly
- 2014 in art - Death of R. Crosby Kemper Jr., Madeline Gins, Douglas Davis, René Ricard, Joan Mondale, Nancy Holt, Terry Adkins, Mirella Levi D'Ancona, Lyman Kipp, Leee Black Childers, Alan Davie, Maria Lassnig, Elaine Sturtevant, H. R. Giger, Robyn Denny, Ultra Violet, Jennifer Wynne Reeves, On Kawara, Otto Piene, Sam Hunter, Edward Leffingwell, Marjorie Strider, David Armstrong, Wynn Chamberlain, Jane Freilicher, Jake Berthot
- 2013 in art - Death of Ted Godwin, Ada Louise Huxtable, Alden Mason, Richard Artschwager, William Perehudoff, Thomas McEvilley, Merton Simpson, Carlos Villa, Zao Wou Ki, David Hayes, Taylor Mead, Thomas M. Messer, Fred Mitchell, Ganesh Pyne, Sarah Charlesworth, Bert Stern, John B. Hightower, Ronnie Cutrone, Walter De Maria, Ruth Asawa, Stephen Antonakos, John Bellany, Jack Beal, Ellen Lanyon, Deborah Turbeville, Sir Anthony Caro, Arthur Danto, Lou Reed, Frank Lobdell, Chryssa
- 2012 in art - Death of Jan Groover, Dorothea Tanning, Mike Kelley, Antoni Tàpies, Theophilus Brown, Anita Steckel, Kenneth Price, Hilton Kramer, Elizabeth Catlett, Louis le Brocquy, John Golding, Bram Bogart, Paul Jenkins, Georges Mathieu, LeRoy Neiman, Mary Fedden, Ivan Karp, Herbert Vogel, Karl Benjamin, Robert Hughes, Michael Asher, Will Barnet, William Turnbull, Jeffrey Potter, Edward Meneeley
- 2011 in art - Death of B. H. Friedman, Ellen Stewart, Dennis Oppenheim, Françoise Cachin, Charles O. Perry, Roy Gussow, Alan Uglow, Suze Rotolo, Gabriel Laderman, Leo Steinberg, George Tooker, Stephen De Staebler, Hedda Sterne, John McCracken, Gunter Sachs, Leonora Carrington, Claudio Bravo, M. F. Husain, Jack Smith, Thomas N. Armstrong III, Robert Miller, Cy Twombly, Lucian Freud, John Hoyland, Budd Hopkins, Jeanette Ingberman, Richard Hamilton, Stephen Mueller, Adrian Berg, Pat Passlof, Gerald Laing, John Chamberlain, Helen Frankenthaler
- 2010 in art - Death of Kenneth Noland, Elaine Hamilton-O'Neal, Robert Natkin, Purvis Young, Deborah Remington, Giuseppe Panza, Avigdor Arikha, Craig Kauffman, Shusaku Arakawa, Dennis Hopper, Lester Johnson, Louise Bourgeois, Sigmar Polke, Paul Thiebaud, Doug Ohlson, Nicolas Carone, Corneille, Ralph T. Coe, Stephen Pace, Robert Goodnough, Sylvia Sleigh, Jack Levine, Nathan Oliveira, Nassos Daphnis, Don Van Vliet, Roy Neuberger

== 2000s ==
- 2009 in art – Death of Coosje van Bruggen, Andrew Wyeth, Howard Kanovitz, Max Neuhaus, Ernest Trova, Hanne Darboven, Frederick Hammersley, Robert Colescott, Dash Snow, Merce Cunningham, Tony Rosenthal, Hyman Bloom, Barry Flanagan, Richard Merkin, Charles Seliger, Nancy Spero, Roy DeCarava, Robert Borgatta, Irving Kriesberg, Jeanne-Claude, Peter Forakis, Thomas Hoving
- 2008 in art – Death of William Brice, Kahlil Gibran, Dorothy Podber, Enrico Donati, Paul Wonner, Robert Rauschenberg, Will Elder, Cornell Capa, John Plumb, Bruce Conner, Manny Farber, John Russell, Alain Jacquet, Grace Hartigan, Jan Krugier, Guy Peellaert, Willoughby Sharp, Robert Graham
- 2007 in art – Death of Dan Christensen, Jules Olitski, Sol LeWitt, Jörg Immendorff, Salvatore Scarpitta, Elizabeth Murray, Edward Avedisian, André Emmerich, Lenore Tawney, R. B. Kitaj, Ileana Sonnabend, Paul Brach, Robert Kulicke, Michael Goldberg, Ismail Gulgee, Herman Rose
- 2006 in art – Death of William Rubin, Mimmo Rotella, Nam June Paik, Allan Kaprow, Isaac Witkin, Karel Appel, Richard Mock, Jason Rhoades, Julio Galán, Marcia Tucker, Emilio Vedova, Robert Rosenblum, Larry Zox, Ruth Bernhard,
- 2005 in art – Death of Philip Johnson, David Whitney, Al Held, Eugene J. Martin, Walter Hopps, Philip Pavia, Neil Welliver, R. C. Gorman, Fritz Scholder, Clement Meadmore, Alvin D. Loving, and Arman; Christo and wife Jeanne-Claude create The Gates in New York's Central Park;
- 2004 in art – Death of Gerome Kamrowski, Ward Jackson, Leon Golub, Henri Cartier-Bresson, Cleve Gray, Agnes Martin, Muriel Berman, Tom Wesselmann
- 2003 in art – Death of Al Hirschfeld, Emerson Woelffer, Lynn Chadwick, Pierre Restany, Dorothy Miller, Kirk Varnedoe, Wally Hedrick
- 2002 in art – Death of Inge Morath, Peter Voulkos, Jean-Paul Riopelle, Niki de Saint Phalle, George Rickey, Richard Lippold, Stan Rice
- 2001 in art – Death of Fred Hughes, O. Winston Link, Balthus, Hollis Sigler, David Sylvester, Italo Scanga, Mercedes Matter
- 2000 in art – Death of Louisa Matthíasdóttir, Edward Gorey, Jacob Lawrence, Stanley Boxer, Leonard Baskin, Gregory Gillespie; Hans Moller

== 1990s ==
- 1999 in art – Death of Norman Bluhm, Nicholas Krushenick, Patrick Heron, Leo Castelli, Stephen Greene, Paul Cadmus
- 1998 in art – Death of Richard Bellamy, Wolf Vostell, John Krushenick, Dick Higgins, Peter Van Riper, Chris Ofili wins the Turner Prize
- 1997 in art – Death of Willem de Kooning, Roy Lichtenstein, Sam Golden, Theodoros Stamos, Philip Berman
- 1996 in art – Death of Duane Hanson, Dan Flavin, William Copley
- 1995 in art – Death of Daniel Robbins, Charles Bell, Harry Shoulberg, Nancy Graves, Al Hansen
- 1994 in art – Death of Donald Judd, Robert Doisneau, Clement Greenberg, Henry Geldzahler, Anni Albers, Paul Delvaux, Sam Francis, Leigh Bowery
- 1993 in art – Death of Hannah Wilke, Richard Diebenkorn, Robert De Niro, Sr., Thomas Ammann, Leonard Bocour; Rachel Whiteread wins the Turner Prize
- 1992 in art – Death of Maria Helena Vieira da Silva, Francis Bacon, David Wojnarowicz, Joan Mitchell, John Cage, David Hare, Peyo
- 1991 in art – Death of Robert Motherwell, Jean Tinguely, Leland Bell, Dr. Seuss, Berenice Abbott
- 1990 in art – Death of Henrietta Berk, Keith Haring, Erté, Mathias Goeritz, Joan Brown

== 1980s ==
- 1989 in art – Death of Salvador Dalí, Robert Mapplethorpe, Lucia Moholy, Mark Morrisroe, Pierre Matisse, Jay DeFeo, Sidney Janis
- 1988 in art – Death of Ronald Bladen, Neil Williams, Isamu Noguchi, Louise Nevelson, Constantino Nivola, Jean-Michel Basquiat, Donald De Lue, Luis Barragán
- 1987 in art – Death of Alexander Iolas, Andy Warhol, Jean Hélion, André Masson, Raphael Soyer
- 1986 in art – Death of Edward Biberman, Georgia O'Keeffe, Jane Frank, Henry Moore, Jaroslav Bejček
- 1985 in art – Death of Marc Chagall, Jean Dubuffet, André Kertész, Ana Mendieta; Charles Saatchi's collection opens to the public arousing interest in Neo-expressionism
- 1984 in art – Death of Jimmy Ernst, Hollis Frampton, Ansel Adams, Sir Roland Penrose, Lee Krasner, Brassaï, Edward James
- 1983 in art – Death of Hergé, Chang Dai-chien, Kenneth Clark, Doris Emrick Lee, Joan Miró
- 1982 in art – Death of Wifredo Lam, Ben Nicholson
- 1981 in art – Death of Francesca Woodman, Isaac Soyer, Max Spivak, Isaac Frenkel Frenel; Birth of Miru Kim
- 1980 in art – Death of Cecil Beaton, Albert Kotin, Oskar Kokoschka, Philip Guston, Clyfford Still, Tony Smith, Graham Sutherland, Tamara de Lempicka; Pablo Picasso major retrospective exhibition at Museum of Modern Art (New York)

== 1970s ==
- 1979 in art – Death of Daniel-Henry Kahnweiler, Nelson Rockefeller, Norman Lewis, Lothar Wolleh, Sonia Delaunay, Peggy Guggenheim,
- 1978 in art – Death of Vincent Willem van Gogh, Thomas B. Hess, Norman Rockwell, Giorgio de Chirico, Otto Kallir
- 1977 in art – Death of Charles Alston, Gertrude Abercrombie, Lee Miller, Naum Gabo. Centre Pompidou opens
- 1976 in art – Birth of Jay Simeon; Death of Max Ernst, Alexander Calder, Paul Strand, Mark Tobey, Josef Albers, Man Ray, Imogen Cunningham, Edward Burra
- 1975 in art – Birth of Alick Tipoti; Death of Thomas Hart Benton, Walker Evans, Barbara Hepworth, Leon Underwood
- 1974 in art – Death of Adolph Gottlieb, William C. Seitz, For the first time in art history, the chemogram invented by Josef H. Neumann closed the separation of the painterly background and the photographic layer in a symbiosis of painting and real photographic perspective.
- 1973 in art – Death of Carl Holty, Edward Steichen, Pablo Picasso, Robert Smithson, Stanton Macdonald-Wright; the first Whitney Biennial
- 1972 in art – Death of M. C. Escher, Joseph Cornell, Enrico Baj creates The Funeral of the Anarchist Pinelli
- 1971 in art – Death of I. Rice Pereira
- 1970 in art – Birth of Jenny Saville; Death of Rita Angus, Mark Rothko, Fritz Ascher, Domenico Gnoli, Eva Hesse, Roberto Longhi, Barnett Newman, Melville Price

== 1960s ==
- 1969 in art – Death of Otto Dix, Ben Shahn, Mies van der Rohe, Walter Gropius, first Lyrical abstraction exhibition at The Aldrich Contemporary Art Museum marking a significant return to expressivity in painting
- 1968 in art – Death of Marcel Duchamp, Kees van Dongen. Birth of Jules Trobaugh
- 1967 in art – Death of Edward Hopper, René Magritte, Ad Reinhardt
- 1966 in art – Death of Alberto Giacometti, Hans Hofmann, Edward Le Bas, The second New York City Armory Show 9 Evenings: Theatre and Engineering sponsored by E.A.T. – Experiments in Art and Technology.
- 1965 in art – Death of Milton Avery, David Smith (sculptor), Le Corbusier; Birth of Damien Hirst and Zamir Yushaev
- 1964 in art – Death of Rico Lebrun, Giorgio Morandi, Stuart Davis
- 1963 in art – Death of Georges Braque, Paul Westheim; Pop Art becomes increasingly popular; Birth of Jon Coffelt, Marco Evaristti, Rachel Whiteread, Jorge Pardo
- 1962 in art – Death of Morris Louis, Franz Kline, Yves Klein, Birth of John Currin, Gary Hume, International exhibition of The New Realists in New York
- 1961 in art – Death of Grandma Moses, Augustus John; Birth of Thomas Tulis
- 1960 in art – Death of David Park and Dean Cornwell; Birth of Jean-Michel Basquiat, Makoto Fujimura, and David Neel. As public interest in Abstract expressionism wanes, Color Field painting, Hard-edge painting, and Minimalism become increasingly popular

== 1950s ==
- 1959 in art – Birth of Caio Fonseca, Death of Frank Lloyd Wright, Sir Jacob Epstein
- 1958 in art – Frank Stella begins black pinstripe paintings; Birth of Brian O'Connor (artist) and Don Yeomans
- 1957 in art – Death of Peter Laszlo Peri, Jack Butler Yeats, Luisa Casati, Diego Rivera, David Bomberg Birth of Lawrence Paul Yuxweluptun
- 1956 in art – Birth of David D. Stern, Death of Marie Laurencin, Walter Emerson Baum，Jackson Pollock
- 1955 in art – Birth of Beau Dick, Jeff Koons, Akira Toriyama; Death of Fernand Léger, Nicolas de Staël, Bradley Walker Tomlin; Jasper Johns completes Flag, (American Flag Painting)
- 1954 in art – Death of André Derain, Frida Kahlo, Hannes Meyer, Henri Matisse, Birth of David Wojnarowicz and Michael Nicoll Yahgulanaas
- 1953 in art – Death of Raoul Dufy, John Marin, Francis Picabia; Birth of Gidansda Guujaaw
- 1952 in art – Jackson Pollock paints Blue Poles, and Number Twelve (damaged by fire in the Governors Mansion, Albany, NY in 1961) an influential and large-scale, colorful stain painting that predicts both Color field painting and Lyrical abstraction
- 1951 in art – Birth of Richard Hunt and Joe Nalo; Death of Wols, Willem de Kooning paints Woman I, the Ninth Street Show of 1951, NYC. A seminal event of abstract expressionism.
- 1950 in art – Jackson Pollock paints Autumn Rhythm

== 1940s ==
- 1949 in art – Birth of Ross Bleckner, Alberto Giacometti completes Three Men Walking II
- 1948 in art – Birth of Eric Fischl, Hollis Sigler, Death of Arshile Gorky, Kurt Schwitters, George Ault
- 1947 in art – Birth of Ronnie Landfield and James Schoppert; Death of Pierre Bonnard, Wilhelm Uhde, Peggy Guggenheim closes The Art of This Century gallery
- 1946 in art – Birth of Robert Mapplethorpe, Kirk Varnedoe, and Robert Davidson; Death of Arthur Dove
- 1945 in art – Birth of Sean Scully, Peter Reginato, death of René Gimpel
- 1944 in art – Birth of Odd Nerdrum, Timothy Akis, and Mathias Kauage; Death of Edvard Munch, Piet Mondrian, Gertrud Grunow, Wassily Kandinsky, Francis Bacon completes Three Studies for Figures at the Base of a Crucifixion
- 1943 in art – Death of Chaïm Soutine, Marsden Hartley, Camille Claudel, Maurice Denis, Beatrix Potter, Piet Mondrian completes Broadway Boogie-Woogie
- 1942 in art – Death of Séraphine Louis, Birth of Dan Christensen and Tony Hunt Sr.; Peggy Guggenheim opens The Art of This Century gallery
- 1941 in art – Death of El Lissitzky, Birth of Bruce Nauman, Dale Chihuly, Death of Robert Delaunay
- 1940 in art – Birth of Mary Ellen Mark, Nancy Graves, Elizabeth Murray, Death of Harry Watrous, Paul Klee, Édouard Vuillard

== 1930s ==
- 1939 in art – Death of Kuzma Petrov-Vodkin, Birth of Spider Martin
- 1938 in art – Birth of Joan Brown, Brice Marden, Eugene J. Martin, and Nathan Jackson; Death of William Glackens, Ernst Ludwig Kirchner, Georges Rochegrosse
- 1937 in art – Birth of David Hockney, Ronald Davis, Larry Poons, Red Grooms, Robert Mangold, Larry Zox, Pablo Picasso paints Guernica and The Weeping Woman; Death of Joseph-Maurice Ravel, French composer and pianist
- 1936 in art – Birth of Richard Estes, Eva Hesse, Frank Stella,
- 1935 in art – Birth of Jim Dine, Don McCullin, Death of Charles Demuth, Paul Signac
- 1934 in art – Birth of Brian O'Doherty aka Patrick Ireland
- 1933 in art – Birth of Sam Gilliam, Yoko Ono, Franco Fontana, James Rosenquist, Dan Flavin
- 1932 in art – Birth of Howard Hodgkin, Paul Caponigro, Nam June Paik, Wolf Vostell
- 1931 in art – Death of Helmut Kolle, Births of Frank Auerbach, Bridget Riley, Tom Wesselmann, Salvador Dalí paints The Persistence of Memory
- 1930 in art – Birth of Jasper Johns, Death of Jules Pascin, Grant Wood paints American Gothic

== 1920s ==
- 1929 in art – Death of Henry Scott Tuke, Louisine Havemeyer, Charles Grafly, Birth of Jules Feiffer, Claes Oldenburg, Nicholas Krushenick, Diego Rivera marries Frida Kahlo, the Museum of Modern Art opens in New York City, René Magritte produces La trahison des images
- 1928 in art – Birth of Andy Warhol, Arman, Yves Klein, Helen Frankenthaler, Donald Judd, Sol LeWitt
- 1927 in art – Death of Paul César Helleu, Juan Gris, Osmar Schindler, Armand Guillaumin, Eugene Atget, Birth of John Chamberlain, Wolf Kahn
- 1926 in art – Death of Mary Cassatt, Claude Monet
- 1925 in art – Death of George Bellows, John Singer Sargent, Lovis Corinth, Johanna van Gogh-Bonger, Roger de La Fresnaye, Félix Vallotton, Birth of Robert Rauschenberg, Joan Mitchell, and Freda Diesing
- 1924 in art – Birth of Kenneth Noland, André Emmerich, Michael Goldberg, George Segal
- 1923 in art – Death of Elihu Vedder, Birth of Marc Riboud, Sam Francis, Roy Lichtenstein, Antoni Tàpies, Marcel Duchamp completes The Bride Stripped Bare By Her Bachelors, Even
- 1922 in art – Birth of Lucian Freud, Richard Diebenkorn, Paul Klee produces Twittering Machine
- 1921 in art – Piet Mondrian completes Composition with Red, Yellow and Blue
- 1920 in art – Birth of Wayne Thiebaud, Gene Davis, Patrick Heron, Helmut Newton, Elaine Hamilton-O'Neal, and Bill Reid; Death of Amedeo Modigliani, Anders Zorn

== 1910s ==
- 1919 in art – Death of Ralph Albert Blakelock, Pierre-Auguste Renoir, Charles Lang Freer, Walter Gropius founds the Bauhaus
- 1918 in art – Birth of Elaine de Kooning, Jane Frank; Death of Gustav Klimt, Amadeo de Souza-Cardoso, Egon Schieleml
- 1917 in art – Birth of Jacob Lawrence, Andrew Wyeth; Death of Edgar Degas, Albert Pinkham Ryder, Louis Édouard Fournier, Marcel Duchamp produces Fountain
- 1916 in art – Birth of Louis le Brocquy and Ellen Neel; Death of Thomas Eakins; Dadaism started in Zürich
- 1915 in art – Birth of Robert Motherwell, Sam Golden, Alberto Burri
- 1914 in art – Birth of Nicolas de Staël, O. Winston Link
- 1913 in art – Birth of Wols, Birth of Robert Capa, Ad Reinhardt, The Armory Show opens in New York City. It displays works of artists who are to become some of the most influential painters of the early 20th century.
- 1912 in art – Birth of Morris Louis, Robert Doisneau, Jackson Pollock, Agnes Martin, Tony Smith, Pablo Picasso creates Still Life with Chair Caning
- 1911 in art
- 1910 in art – Birth of Franz Kline, Death of Henri Rousseau, Winslow Homer

== 1900s ==
- 1909 in art – Death of Pinckney Marcius-Simons, Birth of Francis Bacon, Clement Greenberg, Henri Matisse completes The Dance, Pablo Picasso and Georges Braque jointly collaborate in the invention of Analytic Cubism
- 1908 in art – Death of Giovanni Fattori, Richard Gerstl, Daniel Sargent Curtis Birth of Lee Krasner, Balthus, Henri Cartier-Bresson, Ashcan School first exhibit
- 1907 in art – Birth of Frida Kahlo, Leo Castelli, Charles Alston, Lee Miller; Pablo Picasso paints Les Demoiselles d'Avignon
- 1906 in art – Henri Matisse paints Le bonheur de vivre; Death of Paul Cézanne, Birth of Philip Johnson, David Smith
- 1905 in art – Birth of Ruth Bernhard, Barnett Newman, Fauvists first exhibit; Henri Matisse paints Woman with a Hat
- 1904 in art – Death of Martin Johnson Heade, Birth of Arshile Gorky, Paul Cadmus, Clyfford Still, Willem de Kooning, Salvador Dalí
- 1903 in art – Birth of Mark Rothko, Adolph Gottlieb, Graham Sutherland, Joseph Cornell, Death of Paul Gauguin, Hans Gude, Camille Pissarro, James McNeill Whistler, First Salon d'Automne
- 1902 in art – Birth of Ansel Adams, I. Rice Pereira, Death of Albert Bierstadt, James Tissot, John Henry Twachtman, Rodin's The Thinker cast
- 1901 in art – Birth of Alberto Giacometti, Death of Henri de Toulouse-Lautrec, Picasso's Blue Period begins
- 1900 in art – Birth of Yves Tanguy, Death of Frederic Edwin Church

== 1890s ==
- 1899 in art – Death of Alfred Sisley, Birth of Lucio Fontana, Isaac Frenkel Frenel
- 1898 in art – Birth of Alexander Calder, Henry Moore, René Magritte, Ben Shahn, Peggy Guggenheim, and Carrie Bethel
- 1897 in art – Paul Gauguin paints Where Do We Come From? What Are We? Where Are We Going?
- 1896 in art – Death of John Everett Millais
- 1895 in art – Death of Berthe Morisot
- 1894 in art – Death of Gustave Caillebotte, Birth of James Thurber, Norman Rockwell,
- 1893 in art – Birth of Joan Miró, Chaïm Soutine, Fritz Ascher, Edvard Munch completes The Scream
- 1892 in art – Death of Frederick Richards Leyland, Paul Gauguin paints When Will You Marry?; Birth of Stuart Davis
- 1891 in art – Death of Georges-Pierre Seurat, Birth of Max Ernst, Otto Dix, George Ault
- 1890 in art – Death of Vincent van Gogh, Birth of Giorgio Morandi, Paul Strand, Egon Schiele, Naum Gabo

== 1880s ==
- 1889 in art – Birth of Thomas Hart Benton, Rodin's The Burghers of Calais cast
- 1888 in art – Birth of Joseph Csaky, Josef Albers, Seán Keating, Giorgio de Chirico, Death of James Jackson Jarves; Vincent van Gogh begins his Sunflowers series; Sir Lawrence Alma-Tadema paints The Roses of Heliogabalus
- 1887 in art – Birth of Georgia O'Keeffe, Marc Chagall, Marcel Duchamp, Le Corbusier, Juan Gris, Alexander Archipenko, Andrew Dasburg, August Macke, Death of Hippolyte Bayard
- 1886 in art – Birth of Diego Rivera, Oskar Kokoschka, Mies van der Rohe, Robert Antoine Pinchon, Clément Serveau
- 1885 in art – Birth of Jules Pascin, Robert Delaunay, Sonia Delaunay, Roger de La Fresnaye
- 1884 in art – Birth of Amedeo Modigliani and Daniel-Henry Kahnweiler; Georges Seurat paints Bathers at Asnières; Juan Luna paints the Spoliarium
- 1883 in art – Birth of Jean Metzinger, Charles Demuth, Walter Gropius, Gino Severini, Death of Gustave Doré, Édouard Manet
- 1882 in art – Birth of Edward Hopper, George Bellows, Georges Braque, Auguste Herbin, Umberto Boccioni. Édouard Manet paints A Bar at the Folies-Bergère
- 1881 in art – Death of Raffaelle Monti, Birth of Pablo Picasso, Fernand Léger, Henri Le Fauconnier, Carlo Carrà, Max Pechstein, Albert Gleizes
- 1880 in art – Birth of Hans Hofmann, Jacob Epstein, Ernst Ludwig Kirchner, André Derain, Arthur Dove, Tobeen. Death of Anselm Feuerbach; Anton Mauve completes Changing Pasture; Black Hawk begins a series of 76 ledger drawings.

== 1870s ==
- 1879 in art – Birth of Edward Steichen, Paul Klee, and Mungo Martin; Death of Honoré Daumier, Thomas Couture, George Caleb Bingham, Joseph Severn, William Morris Hunt
- 1878 in art – Birth of Augustus John, Mary Cassatt paints Portrait of the Artist, James Whistler sues John Ruskin for libel
- 1877 in art – Birth of Marsden Hartley, Kees van Dongen, Death of Gustave Courbet
- 1876 in art – Birth of August Sander
- 1875 in art – Death of Jean-François Millet, Jean-Baptiste-Camille Corot
- 1874 in art – Death of Mariano Fortuny, First Impressionist Exhibition is held in a private studio outside the official Paris Salon
- 1873 in art – Monet, Renoir, Pissarro, and Sisley organize the Société Anonyme Coopérative des Artistes; Birth of Willie Seaweed
- 1872 in art – Birth of Piet Mondrian, Claude Monet paints Impression, Sunrise
- 1871 in art – Birth of Jack Butler Yeats, Death of Paul Kane, Whistler's Mother
- 1870 in art – Birth of William Glackens, John Marin, and Lucy Telles

== 1860s ==
- 1869 in art – Birth of Henri Matisse, La Grenouillère (Monet)
- 1868 in art – Birth of Édouard Vuillard
- 1867 in art – Birth of Pierre Bonnard, Frank Lloyd Wright, and Nellie Charlie; Edgar Degas completes Portrait of the Bellelli Family
- 1866 in art – Birth of Wassily Kandinsky
- 1865 in art – Work (Ford Madox Brown) completed
- 1864 in art – Birth of Toulouse-Lautrec
- 1863 in art – Birth of Edvard Munch, Paul Signac, Death of Eugène Delacroix; Manet completes Le déjeuner sur l'herbe and Olympia and exhibits them at the Salon des Refusés to public ridicule and artistic admiration
- 1862 in art – Birth of Gustav Klimt, The Railway Station (W. P. Frith), The Turkish Bath (Ingres)
- 1861 in art – Manet first accepted by Salon (Paris)
- 1860 in art – Birth of Walter Sickert, Grandma Moses

== 1850s ==
- 1859 in art – Birth of Georges-Pierre Seurat
- 1858 in art – Death of Hiroshige
- 1857 in art – Birth of Eugène Atget, Louis Édouard Fournier
- 1856 in art – Ingres completes Portrait of Madame Moitessier
- 1855 in art – Death of Jean-Baptiste Isabey, Gustave Courbet exhibits his paintings including the monumental The Artist's Studio in a tent alongside the official Paris Salon, creating public outrage and artistic admiration. Birth of Evelyn De Morgan
- 1854 in art – Death of John Martin, La rencontre (Courbet), Ramsgate Sands (Frith), The Light of the World (Holman Hunt)
- 1853 in art – Birth of Vincent van Gogh, Ingres completes Princesse Albert de Broglie
- 1852 in art – Death of John Vanderlyn, John Everett Millais completes Ophelia
- 1851 in art – Death of J. M. W. Turner
- 1850 in art – Jean-François Millet completes The Sower

== 1840s ==
- 1849 in art – Pre-Raphaelite Brotherhood first exhibits
- 1848 in art – Birth of Paul Gauguin, Gustave Caillebotte, Death of Thomas Cole
- 1847 in art – Birth of Albert Pinkham Ryder, Ralph Albert Blakelock
- 1846 in art
- 1845 in art
- 1844 in art – Birth of Thomas Eakins, Mary Cassatt, Henri Rousseau, and Edmonia Lewis; J. M. W. Turner paints Rain, Steam and Speed
- 1843 in art
- 1842 in art – J. M. W. Turner paints Peace – Burial at Sea
- 1841 in art – Birth of Pierre-Auguste Renoir, Berthe Morisot, Collapsible zinc oil paint tube invented
- 1840 in art – Birth of Claude Monet; Death of Caspar David Friedrich

== 1830s ==
- 1839 in art – Birth of Paul Cézanne, Alfred Sisley, and Charles Edenshaw; J. M. W. Turner paints The Fighting Temeraire
- 1838 in art
- 1837 in art – Death of François Gérard, John Constable
- 1836 in art – Birth of Winslow Homer
- 1835 in art
- 1834 in art – Birth of Edgar Degas, James McNeill Whistler
- 1833 in art
- 1832 in art – Birth of Édouard Manet
- 1831 in art – The Great Wave off Kanagawa by Katsushika Hokusai
- 1830 in art – Birth of Camille Pissarro, Albert Bierstadt, Eugène Delacroix paints Liberty Leading the People; Hokusai paints The Great Wave off Kanagawa

== 1820s ==
- 1829 in art – Birth of Anselm Feuerbach, John Everett Millais, and Dat So La Lee
- 1828 in art – Death of Francisco Goya
- 1827 in art – Death of William Blake
- 1826 in art – Birth of Frederic Edwin Church
- 1825 in art – Birth of Hans Gude, Death of Jacques-Louis David
- 1824 in art – Death of Théodore Géricault
- 1823 in art - Birth of Alexandre Cabanel
- 1822 in art
- 1821 in art – John Constable completes The Hay Wain
- 1820 in art

== 1810s ==
- 1819 in art – Birth of Gustave Courbet; Théodore Géricault paints The Raft of the Medusa,
- 1818 in art
- 1817 in art
- 1816 in art – Birth of Pyotr Zakharov-Chechenets
- 1815 in art
- 1814 in art – Francisco Goya paints The Third of May 1808, Birth of Jean-François Millet
- 1813 in art
- 1812 in art
- 1811 in art
- 1810 in art – Francisco Goya begins painting his 82-piece series The Disasters of War; Birth of Paul Kane

== 1800s ==
- 1809 in art
- 1808 in art – William Blake completes Satan Watching the Endearments of Adam and Eve. Birth of Honoré Daumier
- 1807 in art
- 1806 in art – Death of Jean-Honoré Fragonard
- 1805 in art
- 1804 in art
- 1803 in art
- 1802 in art – Death of Thomas Girtin
- 1801 in art – Birth of Thomas Cole
- 1800 in art – Francisco Goya paints The Naked Maja

== 1790s ==
- 1799 in art
- 1798 in art – Birth of Eugène Delacroix
- 1797 in art
- 1796 in art – Birth of Jean-Baptiste-Camille Corot
- 1795 in art
- 1794 in art
- 1793 in art – Jacques-Louis David paints The Death of Marat
- 1792 in art
- 1791 in art – Birth of Théodore Géricault, George Harley (painter)
- 1790 in art – The Aztec calendar stone is discovered.

== 1780s ==
- 1789 in art
- 1788 in art – Death of Thomas Gainsborough
- 1787 in art – Death of Pompeo Batoni
- 1786 in art
- 1785 in art
- 1784 in art
- 1783 in art
- 1782 in art
- 1781 in art
- 1780 in art – Birth of Jean Auguste Dominique Ingres

== 1770s ==
- 1779 in art – Death of Jean-Baptiste-Siméon Chardin
- 1778 in art
- 1777 in art
- 1776 in art – Birth of John Vanderlyn, John Constable
- 1775 in art – Birth of J. M. W. Turner
- 1774 in art – Birth of Caspar David Friedrich
- 1773 in art
- 1772 in art
- 1771 in art
- 1770 in art – Death of François Boucher, Thomas Gainsborough paints The Blue Boy

== 1760s ==
- 1769 in art
- 1768 in art
- 1767 in art
- 1766 in art
- 1765 in art
- 1764 in art
- 1763 in art
- 1762 in art
- 1761 in art – Birth of John Opie
- 1760 in art

== 1750s ==
- 1759 in art
- 1758 in art - Death of Bartolomeo Nazari
- 1757 in art – Death of Rosalba Carriera, Birth of William Blake
- 1756 in art
- 1755 in art
- 1754 in art
- 1753 in art
- 1752 in art
- 1751 in art
- 1750 in art – Death of Rachel Ruysch, Thomas Gainsborough paints Mr and Mrs Andrews

== 1740s ==
- 1749 in art
- 1748 in art – Birth of Jacques-Louis David
- 1747 in art
- 1746 in art – Birth of Francisco Goya, François-André Vincent
- 1745 in art
- 1744 in art
- 1743 in art
- 1742 in art
- 1741 in art
- 1740 in art

== 1730s ==
- 1739 in art
- 1738 in art
- 1737 in art
- 1736 in art
- 1735 in art
- 1734 in art
- 1733 in art – Death of Nicolas Coustou
- 1732 in art – Birth of Jean-Honoré Fragonard; Death of Christian Richter (painter, born 1678)
- 1731 in art
- 1730 in art

== 1720s ==
- 1729 in art
- 1728 in art
- 1727 in art – Birth of Thomas Gainsborough
- 1726 in art
- 1725 in art
- 1724 in art
- 1723 in art
- 1722 in art – Death of Claude Gillot
- 1721 in art – Death of Antoine Watteau
- 1720 in art

== 1710s ==
- 1719 in art – Death of Christoph Ludwig Agricola, Birth of Charles van Loo
- 1718 in art – Birth of Alexander Roslin
- 1717 in art
- 1716 in art – Birth of Joseph-Marie Vien
- 1715 in art – Death of François Girardon
- 1714 in art
- 1713 in art – Birth of František Prokyš, Allan Ramsay, Richard Wilson
- 1712 in art – Birth of Francesco Guardi
- 1711 in art – Birth of Carl Gustaf Pilo
- 1710 in art

== 1700s ==
- 1709 in art – Death of Meindert Hobbema, Andrea Pozzo
- 1708 in art – Death of Ludolf Bakhuysen, Birth of Pompeo Girolamo Batoni
- 1707 in art – Death of Evert Collier, Shitao, W. Velde the Younger, Birth of William Hoare, Van Loo
- 1706 in art – Death of Luo Mu
- 1705 in art – Death of Plautilla Bricci, Zhu Da, Birth of Charles-André van Loo
- 1704 in art
- 1703 in art – Birth of François Boucher
- 1702 in art – Birth of Carlo Marchionni; end of Dutch Golden Age painting
- 1701 in art – Birth of Pietro Longhi, Thomas Hudson
- 1700 in art – Birth of Charles-Joseph Natoire, Death of Pietro Santi Bartoli; end of Flemish Baroque painting; Possible date of rock paintings at the Burro Flats site

== 1690s ==
- 1699 in art – Birth of Jean-Baptiste-Siméon Chardin
- 1698 in art
- 1697 in art
- 1696 in art – Birth of Giovanni Battista Tiepolo
- 1695 in art
- 1694 in art – Death of Filippo Lauri
- 1693 in art
- 1692 in art
- 1691 in art
- 1690 in art – Death of David Teniers the Younger

== 1680s ==
- 1689 in art
- 1688 in art
- 1687 in art
- 1686 in art
- 1685 in art
- 1684 in art – Birth of Antoine Watteau
- 1683 in art
- 1682 in art – The Treaty of Shackamaxon is depicted on a wampum belt.
- 1681 in art
- 1680 in art – Death of Giovanni Lorenzo Bernini, Italian sculptor/architect

== 1670s ==
- 1679 in art - Death of Ludolf de Jongh
- 1678 in art – Birth of Christian Richter
- 1677 in art
- 1676 in art
- 1675 in art – Death of Johannes Vermeer
- 1674 in art – Death of Kanō Tan'yū
- 1673 in art – Birth of Claude Gillot
- 1672 in art
- 1671 in art
- 1670 in art – Death of Viviano Codazzi

== 1660s ==
- 1669 in art – Death of Rembrandt
- 1668 in art
- 1667 in art
- 1666 in art – Death of Frans Hals, Jan Vermeer paints Girl with a Pearl Earring
- 1665 in art – Death of Nicolas Poussin
- 1664 in art
- 1663 in art
- 1662 in art
- 1661 in art
- 1660 in art – Death of Govert Flinck, Diego Velázquez

== 1650s ==
- 1659 in art – Rembrandt completes Jacob Wrestling with the Angel
- 1658 in art
- 1657 in art
- 1656 in art – Diego Velázquez completes Las Meninas
- 1655 in art
- 1654 in art – Death of Alessandro Algardi
- 1653 in art
- 1652 in art – Death of José Ribera
- 1651 in art – Diego Velázquez completes the Rokeby Venus
- 1650 in art

== 1640s ==
- 1649 in art – Death of David Teniers the Elder
- 1648 in art
- 1647 in art – Birth of Jean Jouvenet
- 1646 in art
- 1645 in art
- 1644 in art
- 1643 in art
- 1642 in art – Rembrandt completes the Night Watch, Death of Guido Reni
- 1641 in art
- 1640 in art – Death of Peter Paul Rubens

== 1630s ==
- 1639 in art
- 1638 in art – Death of Pieter Brueghel the Younger
- 1637 in art
- 1636 in art
- 1635 in art
- 1634 in art
- 1633 in art – Anthony van Dyck completes Self-portrait with a Sunflower
- 1632 in art – Birth of Johannes Vermeer
- 1631 in art
- 1630 in art – Diego Velázquez completes Apolo en la Fragua de Vulcano

== 1620s ==
- 1629 in art – Birth of Pieter de Hooch
- 1628 in art
- 1627 in art - Death of Cardinal Francesco Del Monte
- 1626 in art – Birth of Jan Steen
- 1625 in art
- 1624 in art – Frans Hals paints the Laughing Cavalier
- 1623 in art
- 1622 in art – Birth of Luo Mu
- 1621 in art
- 1620 in art

== 1610s ==
- 1619 in art – Birth of Charles Le Brun
- 1618 in art – Death of Fillide Melandroni, Velázquez paints The Waterseller of Seville
- 1617 in art – Birth of Bartolomé Estéban Murillo
- 1616 in art
- 1615 in art – Death of Hans von Aachen
- 1614 in art – Death of El Greco
- 1613 in art
- 1612 in art
- 1611 in art
- 1610 in art – Birth of David Teniers the Younger; Death of Caravaggio

== 1600s ==
- 1609 in art
- 1608 in art
- 1607 in art
- 1606 in art – Birth of Rembrandt
- 1605 in art
- 1604 in art
- 1603 in art
- 1602 in art
- 1601 in art
- 1600 in art – El Greco completes View of Toledo, Caravaggio completes Crucifixion of St. Peter; start of Baroque art period

== 1590s ==
- 1599 in art – Birth of Diego Velázquez, Anthony van Dyck
- 1598 in art – Birth of Alessandro Algardi, Francisco de Zurbarán
- 1597 in art
- 1596 in art
- 1595 in art
- 1594 in art – Birth of Nicolas Poussin; Death of Tintoretto
- 1593 in art – Birth of Jacob Jordaens; Death of Giuseppe Arcimboldo
- 1592 in art
- 1591 in art
- 1590 in art

== 1580s ==
- 1589 in art
- 1588 in art – Birth of Hendrick ter Brugghen
- 1587 in art
- 1586 in art
- 1585 in art – start of Flemish Baroque painting
- 1584 in art – start of Dutch Golden Age painting
- 1583 in art
- 1582 in art – Birth of David Teniers the Elder
- 1581 in art
- 1580 in art – Birth of Frans Hals; end of Mannerism art period in Italy

== 1570s ==
- 1579 in art
- 1578 in art
- 1577 in art – Birth of Peter Paul Rubens
- 1576 in art – Death of Titian
- 1575 in art – Birth of Guido Reni
- 1574 in art
- 1573 in art
- 1572 in art – Death of François Clouet, Agnolo di Cosimo
- 1571 in art – Birth of Caravaggio, Death of Niccolò dell'Abbate, Benvenuto Cellini
- 1570 in art

== 1560s ==
- 1569 in art – Death of Pieter Bruegel the Elder
- 1568 in art
- 1567 in art
- 1566 in art
- 1565 in art
- 1564 in art – Birth of Pieter Brueghel the Younger, Death of Michelangelo
- 1563 in art
- 1562 in art
- 1561 in art - Death of Paul Dax, Luca Martini
- 1560 in art

== 1550s ==
- 1559 in art –
- 1558 in art –
- 1557 in art –
- 1556 in art – Death of Girolamo da Carpi
- 1555 in art –
- 1554 in art –
- 1553 in art –
- 1552 in art – Birth of Hans von Aachen
- 1551 in art –
- 1550 in art –

== 1540s ==
- 1549 in art - Birth of Francesco Maria del Monte
- 1548 in art – Tintoretto completes St Mark's Body Brought to Venice
- 1547 in art
- 1546 in art
- 1545 in art
- 1544 in art
- 1543 in art – Death of Hans Holbein the Younger
- 1542 in art
- 1541 in art – Michelangelo completes painting The Last Judgment in the Sistine Chapel, Birth of El Greco
- 1540 in art

== 1530s ==
- 1539 in art
- 1538 in art – Death of Hans Dürer
- 1537 in art
- 1536 in art
- 1535 in art
- 1534 in art
- 1533 in art
- 1532 in art
- 1531 in art
- 1530 in art

== 1520s ==
- 1529 in art – Birth of Paolo Veronese
- 1528 in art – Death of Matthias Grünewald
- 1527 in art – Birth of Giuseppe Arcimboldo, Death of Niccolò Machiavelli; Hans Holbein the Younger completes his Portrait of Sir Thomas More
- 1526 in art
- 1525 in art – Birth of Pieter Bruegel the Elder
- 1524 in art
- 1523 in art
- 1522 in art
- 1521 in art
- 1520 in art – Death of Raphael; start of Mannerism art period

== 1510s ==
- 1519 in art – Death of Leonardo da Vinci
- 1518 in art – Birth of Tintoretto
- 1517 in art
- 1516 in art – Death of Hieronymus Bosch
- 1515 in art – Matthias Grünewald completes the Isenheim Altarpiece
- 1514 in art
- 1513 in art
- 1512 in art – Michelangelo completes painting the Sistine Chapel ceiling, Birth of Niccolò dell'Abbate
- 1511 in art
- 1510 in art – Birth of François Clouet, Death of Sandro Botticelli

== 1500s ==
- 1509 in art
- 1508 in art
- 1507 in art
- 1506 in art – Leonardo da Vinci completes the Mona Lisa (approximately)
- 1505 in art
- 1504 in art – Michelangelo completes the David, Hieronymus Bosch completes The Garden of Earthly Delights
- 1503 in art – Birth of Agnolo di Cosimo
- 1502 in art
- 1501 in art – Birth of Girolamo da Carpi
- 1500 in art – Birth of Benvenuto Cellini

== 1490s ==
- 1499 in art – Michelangelo completes the Pietà
- 1498 in art – Leonardo da Vinci completes The Last Supper
- 1497 in art – Birth of Hans Holbein the Younger
- 1496 in art
- 1495 in art – Tilman Riemenschneider sculpts Seated Bishop
- 1494 in art – Birth of Ambrosius Holbein, Jacopo Pontormo; Death of Domenico Ghirlandaio
- 1493 in art
- 1492 in art – Death of Piero della Francesca
- 1491 in art
- 1490 in art – Birth of Hans Dürer, Hieronymus Bosch completes The Haywain Triptych

== 1480s ==
- 1489 in art – Death of Simon Marmion
- 1488 in art
- 1487 in art
- 1486 in art
- 1485 in art – Birth of Sebastiano del Piombo, Titian, Urs Graf
- 1484 in art
- 1483 in art – Birth of Raphael
- 1482 in art
- 1481 in art – Death of Jean Fouquet
- 1480 in art – Birth of Hans Baldung

== 1470s ==
- 1479 in art
- 1478 in art
- 1477 in art
- 1476 in art – Death of Simonetta Vespucci
- 1475 in art – Birth of Michelangelo, death of Paolo Uccello
- 1474 in art
- 1473 in art
- 1472 in art
- 1471 in art
- 1470 in art – Paolo Uccello completes Saint George and the Dragon; Birth of Matthias Grünewald

== 1460s ==
- 1469 in art
- 1468 in art
- 1467 in art
- 1466 in art – Death of Donatello
- 1465 in art
- 1464 in art – Death of Rogier van der Weyden
- 1463 in art
- 1462 in art – Birth of Piero di Cosimo
- 1461 in art
- 1460 in art – Paolo Uccello completes The Battle of San Romano

== 1450s ==
- 1459 in art
- 1458 in art
- 1457 in art
- 1456 in art
- 1455 in art – Death of Fra Angelico, Lorenzo Ghiberti
- 1454 in art
- 1453 in art
- 1452 in art – Braque Triptych by Rogier van der Weyden, Melun Diptych by Jean Fouquet; Birth of Leonardo da Vinci
- 1451 in art – Fra Angelico completes the frescoes of the Niccoline Chapel
- 1450 in art – Birth of Hieronymus Bosch; Death of Stefano di Giovanni (Sassetta); David with the Head of Goliath by Andrea del Castagno

== 1440s ==
- 1449 in art – Birth of Domenico Ghirlandaio
- 1448 in art
- 1447 in art – Death of Masolino da Panicale
- 1446 in art – Birth of Pietro Perugino
- 1445 in art – The Seven Sacraments Altarpiece by Rogier van der Weyden; Birth of Sandro Botticelli
- 1444 in art – The Miraculous Draft of Fishes by Konrad Witz; Death of Robert Campin
- 1443 in art
- 1442 in art
- 1441 in art – Death of Jan van Eyck
- 1440 in art – Robert Campin completes The Annunciation

== 1430s ==
- 1439 in art – Jan van Eyck completes Portrait of Margaret van Eyck; Birth of Cosimo Rosselli
- 1438 in art – Jan van Eyck completes Madonna in the Church; Fra Angelico completes the San Marco Altarpiece
- 1437 in art – Jan van Eyck completes the Dresden Triptych
- 1436 in art – Paolo Uccello completes the Funerary Monument to Sir John Hawkwood
- 1435 in art – The Werl Triptych by Robert Campin; The Madonna of Chancellor Rolin by Jan van Eyck; The Descent from the Cross by Rogier van der Weyden
- 1434 in art – Jan van Eyck completes the Arnolfini Portrait, The Annunciation, and The Virgin and Child with Canon van der Paele
- 1433 in art – Portrait of a Man in a Turban by Jan van Eyck; The Annunciation of Cortona by Fra Angelico
- 1432 in art – Jan van Eyck completes Ghent Altarpiece and Léal Souvenir; Fra Angelico completes the Deposition of Christ
- 1431 in art – Jan van Eyck completes the Portrait of Cardinal Niccolò Albergati; Birth of Andrea Mantegna
- 1430 in art – Jan van Eyck completes Portrait of a Man with a Blue Chaperon and the Crucifixion and Last Judgment diptych; Birth of Carlo Crivelli, Hans Memling, end of Medieval art art period

== 1420s ==
- 1429 in art
- 1428 in art – Jan van Eyck completes Portrait of Isabella of Portugal; Death of Masaccio
- 1427 in art
- 1426 in art – Sassetta completes St. Anthony Beaten by Devils
- 1425 in art – The Mérode Altarpiece by Robert Campin; Birth of Simon Marmion
- 1424 in art – Virgin and Child with Saint Anne by Masaccio and Masolino da Panicale; Fra Angelico completes the Fiesole Altarpiece
- 1423 in art
- 1422 in art
- 1421 in art
- 1420 in art – Jan van Eyck is estimated to have completed Woman Bathing; the Forbidden City and the Temple of Heaven are constructed in Beijing; Birth of Piero della Francesca, Jean Fouquet

== 1410s ==
- 1419 in art
- 1418 in art
- 1417 in art –
- 1416 in art
- 1415 in art
- 1414 in art
- 1413 in art
- 1412 in art
- 1411 in art
- 1410 in art – The Three Marys at the Tomb by Hubert van Eyck; Death of Theophanes the Greek

== 1400s ==
- 1409 in art
- 1408 in art – The Transfiguration of Jesus by Theophanes the Greek; David by Donatello
- 1407 in art
- 1406 in art – Birth of Fillipo Lippi
- 1405 in art
- 1404 in art
- 1403 in art
- 1402 in art
- 1401 in art – Birth of Masaccio
- 1400 in art – The rock art at the Takiroa Rock Art Shelter; Birth of Bernat Martorell, Start of Quattrocento

== 1390s ==
- 1399 in art – Birth of Rogier van der Weyden, Completion of the Wilton Diptych (Artist unknown)
- 1398 in art – Birth of Konrad Witz
- 1397 in art – Birth of Paolo Uccello
- 1396 in art
- 1395 in art – Birth of Fra Angelico
- 1394 in art
- 1393 in art
- 1392 in art – Birth of Sassetta
- 1391 in art
- 1390 in art

== 1380s ==
- 1389 in art
- 1388 in art
- 1387 in art
- 1386 in art – Birth of Donatello
- 1385 in art – Birth of Jan van Eyck
- 1384 in art
- 1383 in art – Birth of Masolino da Panicale
- 1382 in art
- 1381 in art – Jaume Serra completes Descent into Hell
- 1380 in art

== 1370s ==
- 1379 in art
- 1378 in art – Birth of Lorenzo Ghiberti
- 1377 in art – Birth of Filippo Brunelleschi
- 1376 in art
- 1375 in art – Birth of Robert Campin
- 1374 in art – Death of Petrarch
- 1373 in art
- 1372 in art
- 1371 in art
- 1370 in art

== 1360s ==
- 1369 in art
- 1368 in art
- 1367 in art
- 1366 in art – Birth of Hubert van Eyck
- 1365 in art
- 1364 in art
- 1363 in art
- 1362 in art
- 1361 in art
- 1360 in art

== 1350s ==
- 1359 in art
- 1358 in art
- 1357 in art
- 1356 in art
- 1355 in art – Birth of Melchior Broederlam
- 1354 in art
- 1353 in art
- 1352 in art
- 1351 in art
- 1350 in art

== 1340s ==
- 1349 in art
- 1348 in art – Dwelling in the Fuchun Mountains by Huang Gongwang; Death of Ambrogio Lorenzetti, Pietro Lorenzetti
- 1347 in art
- 1346 in art
- 1345 in art
- 1344 in art – Death of Simone Martini
- 1343 in art
- 1342 in art
- 1341 in art
- 1340 in art – Birth of Theophanes the Greek

== 1330s ==
- 1339 in art – The Allegory of Good and Bad Government is finished by Ambrogio Lorenzetti
- 1338 in art
- 1337 in art – Death of Giotto
- 1336 in art
- 1335 in art
- 1334 in art
- 1333 in art – The Annunciation with St. Margaret and St. Ansanus
- 1332 in art
- 1331 in art
- 1330 in art

== 1320s ==
- 1329 in art
- 1328 in art
- 1327 in art
- 1326 in art
- 1325 in art – Birth of Puccio Capanna
- 1324 in art
- 1323 in art
- 1322 in art
- 1321 in art
- 1320 in art

== 1310s ==
- 1319 in art – Death of Duccio
- 1318 in art
- 1317 in art
- 1316 in art
- 1315 in art - Death of Giovanni Pisano (c.)
- 1314 in art
- 1313 in art
- 1312 in art
- 1311 in art
- 1310 in art

== 1300s ==
- 1309 in art
- 1308 in art – Maestà by Duccio di Buoninsegna
- 1307 in art
- 1306 in art
- 1305 in art – The Scrovegni Chapel frescoes are made by Giotto
- 1304 in art – Birth of Petrarch
- 1303 in art
- 1302 in art – Death of Cimabue (exact date unknown)
- 1301 in art
- 1300 in art

== 1290s ==
- 1299 in art
- 1298 in art
- 1297 in art
- 1296 in art
- 1295 in art – The Muisca raft
- 1294 in art
- 1293 in art
- 1292 in art
- 1291 in art
- 1290 in art – Birth of Ambrogio Lorenzetti

== 1280s ==
- 1289 in art
- 1288 in art
- 1287 in art
- 1286 in art
- 1285 in art – Rucellai Madonna by Duccio di Buoninsegnia
- 1284 in art – Birth of Simone Martini, Nicola Pisano
- 1283 in art
- 1282 in art
- 1281 in art
- 1280 in art – Birth of Pietro Lorenzetti

== 1270s ==
- 1279 in art
- 1278 in art
- 1277 in art
- 1276 in art – Death of Coppo di Marcovaldo
- 1275 in art
- 1274 in art
- 1273 in art
- 1272 in art
- 1271 in art
- 1270 in art

== 1260s ==
- 1269 in art
- 1268 in art
- 1267 in art – Birth of Giotto di Bondone (exact date unknown)
- 1266 in art
- 1265 in art
- 1264 in art
- 1263 in art
- 1262 in art
- 1261 in art
- 1260 in art

== 1250s ==
- 1259 in art
- 1258 in art
- 1257 in art
- 1256 in art
- 1255 in art – Birth of Duccio di Buoninsegna
- 1254 in art
- 1253 in art
- 1252 in art
- 1251 in art
- 1250 in art – The Etowah plates; Earliest date of the Moai of Easter Island

== 1240s ==
- 1249 in art – Death of Wuzhun Shifan (Chinese; (b.1178))
- 1248 in art
- 1247 in art
- 1246 in art
- 1245 in art
- 1244 in art
- 1243 in art
- 1242 in art
- 1241 in art
- 1240 in art – Birth of Cimabue (exact date unknown)

== 1230s ==
- 1239 in art – Birth of Gaddo Gaddi
- 1238 in art
- 1237 in art
- 1236 in art
- 1235 in art
- 1234 in art
- 1233 in art
- 1232 in art
- 1231 in art
- 1230 in art

== 1220s ==
- 1229 in art
- 1228 in art
- 1227 in art
- 1226 in art
- 1225 in art – Nicholas of Verdun's The Shrine of the Three Kings is completed; Birth of Coppo di Marcovaldo
- 1224 in art
- 1223 in art – Death of Unkei
- 1222 in art
- 1221 in art
- 1220 in art

== 1210s ==
- 1219 in art
- 1218 in art
- 1217 in art
- 1216 in art
- 1215 in art – Birth of Bonaventura Berlinghieri
- 1214 in art
- 1213 in art
- 1212 in art
- 1211 in art
- 1210 in art

== 1200s ==
- 1209 in art
- 1208 in art
- 1207 in art
- 1206 in art
- 1205 in art – The Legend of the Seven Sleepers of Ephesus stained glass done for Rouen Cathedral
- 1204 in art
- 1203 in art
- 1202 in art
- 1201 in art
- 1200 in art – The Wulfing cache

== 1190s ==
- 1199 in art
- 1198 in art
- 1197 in art
- 1196 in art
- 1195 in art – Birth of Xia Gui
- 1194 in art
- 1193 in art
- 1192 in art
- 1191 in art
- 1190 in art

== 1180s ==
- 1189 in art
- 1188 in art
- 1187 in art
- 1186 in art
- 1185 in art
- 1184 in art
- 1183 in art
- 1182 in art
- 1181 in art
- 1180 in art – Birth of Giunta Pisano

== 1170s ==
- 1179 in art
- 1178 in art – Birth of Wuzhun Shifan
- 1177 in art
- 1176 in art
- 1175 in art
- 1174 in art
- 1173 in art
- 1172 in art
- 1171 in art
- 1170 in art

== 1160s ==
- 1169 in art
- 1168 in art
- 1167 in art
- 1166 in art
- 1165 in art
- 1164 in art
- 1163 in art
- 1162 in art
- 1161 in art
- 1160 in art – Birth of Ma Yuan

== 1150s ==
- 1159 in art
- 1158 in art
- 1157 in art
- 1156 in art
- 1155 in art
- 1154 in art
- 1153 in art
- 1152 in art
- 1151 in art – Birth of Unkei
- 1150 in art

== 1140s ==
- 1149 in art
- 1148 in art
- 1147 in art
- 1146 in art
- 1145 in art – Death of Zhang Zeduan
- 1144 in art
- 1143 in art
- 1142 in art
- 1141 in art
- 1140 in art

== 1130s ==
- 1139 in art
- 1138 in art
- 1137 in art
- 1136 in art
- 1135 in art
- 1134 in art
- 1133 in art
- 1132 in art
- 1131 in art
- 1130 in art – Birth of Nicholas of Verdun

== 1120s ==
- 1129 in art
- 1128 in art
- 1127 in art
- 1126 in art
- 1125 in art
- 1124 in art – Li Tang paints Wind in the Pines Amid Ten Thousand Valleys
- 1123 in art
- 1122 in art
- 1121 in art
- 1120 in art – The Genji Monogatari Emaki is produced.

== 1110s ==
- 1119 in art – Death of Wang Ximeng
- 1118 in art
- 1117 in art
- 1116 in art
- 1115 in art
- 1114 in art
- 1113 in art – Mosaic Saint Demetrius of Thessaloniki completed; Wang Ximeng completes A Thousand Li of Rivers and Mountains
- 1112 in art
- 1111 in art
- 1110 in art

== 1100s ==
- 1109 in art
- 1108 in art
- 1107 in art
- 1106 in art – Death of Li Gonglin
- 1105 in art – Death of Huang Tingjian
- 1104 in art
- 1103 in art
- 1102 in art
- 1101 in art – Death of Su Shi
- 1100 in art – Construction of Jaketown in Mississippi.

== 1090s ==
- 1099 in art
- 1098 in art
- 1097 in art
- 1096 in art
- 1095 in art
- 1094 in art
- 1093 in art
- 1092 in art
- 1091 in art
- 1090 in art – Death of Guo Xi

== 1080s ==
- 1089 in art
- 1088 in art
- 1087 in art
- 1086 in art
- 1085 in art – Zhang Zeduan finishes Along the River During the Qingming Festival
- 1084 in art
- 1083 in art
- 1082 in art – Birth of Huizong of Song
- 1081 in art
- 1080 in art

== 1070s ==
- 1079 in art – Death of Wen Tong
- 1078 in art
- 1077 in art
- 1076 in art
- 1075 in art
- 1074 in art – Guo Xi paints Early Spring
- 1073 in art
- 1072 in art
- 1071 in art
- 1070 in art

== 1060s ==
- 1069 in art
- 1068 in art
- 1067 in art
- 1066 in art
- 1065 in art
- 1064 in art
- 1063 in art
- 1062 in art
- 1061 in art – Cui Bai paints Double Happiness
- 1060 in art

== 1050s ==
- 1059 in art
- 1058 in art
- 1057 in art
- 1056 in art – The Pagoda of Fogong Temple
- 1055 in art
- 1054 in art
- 1053 in art
- 1052 in art – The Longxing Temple
- 1051 in art – Death of Xu Daoning
- 1050 in art

== 1040s ==
- 1049 in art – Birth of Li Gonglin
- 1048 in art
- 1047 in art
- 1046 in art
- 1045 in art – Birth of Huang Tingjian
- 1044 in art
- 1043 in art
- 1042 in art
- 1041 in art
- 1040 in art

== 1030s ==
- 1039 in art
- 1038 in art
- 1037 in art – Birth of Su Shi
- 1036 in art
- 1035 in art
- 1034 in art
- 1033 in art
- 1032 in art
- 1031 in art
- 1030 in art

== 1020s ==
- 1029 in art
- 1028 in art
- 1027 in art
- 1026 in art
- 1025 in art
- 1024 in art
- 1023 in art
- 1022 in art
- 1021 in art
- 1020 in art – Birth of Guo Xi

== 1010s ==
- 1019 in art – Birth of Wen Tong
- 1018 in art
- 1017 in art
- 1016 in art
- 1015 in art
- 1014 in art
- 1013 in art
- 1012 in art
- 1011 in art
- 1010 in art

== 1000s ==
- 1009 in art
- 1008 in art
- 1007 in art
- 1006 in art
- 1005 in art
- 1004 in art
- 1003 in art
- 1002 in art
- 1001 in art
- 1000 in art – Birth of Yi Yuanji; Rock paintings at Chumash Painted Cave State Historic Park

== Pre 1000 ==
=== 10th Century AD ===
- c. 983 AD – Gommateshwara statue
- c. 975 AD – Bishop Petros with Saint Peter the Apostle
- c. 968 AD – Magdeburg Ivories

=== 9th Century AD ===
- 800–820 AD – Easby Cross

=== 8th Century AD ===
- Ruthwell Cross

=== 7th Century AD ===
- Late 7th Century AD? – Bewcastle Cross
- 652 AD – The Giant Wild Goose Pagoda
- 634 AD – Emperor Taizong Receiving the Tibetan Envoy by Yan Liben
- Early 7th Century AD – Gilt-bronze Maitreya in Meditation

=== 6th Century AD ===
- 523 AD – The Songyue Pagoda

=== 5th Century AD ===
- Nymph of the Luo River (洛神賦) by Gu Kaizhi

=== 4th Century AD ===
- 315 AD – Arch of Constantine

=== 3rd Century AD ===
- c. 250–260 AD – Ludovisi Battle sarcophagus
- 203 AD – Arch of Septimius Severus

=== 2nd Century AD ===
- 193 AD – Column of Marcus Aurelius
- 162 AD – Tuxtla Statuette
- 151 AD – The Wu Family Shrines
- 143 AD – La Mojarra Stela 1
- 113 AD – Trajan's Column

=== 1st Century AD ===
- 5 AD – The sculptures at San Agustín Archaeological Park
- ? – The Rice Terraces of the Philippine Cordilleras and the Pomier Caves rock art.

=== 1st Century BC ===
- 9 BC – Ara Pacis
- 57 BC – Temple of Edfu

=== 2nd Century BC ===
- 180 BC – The Pergamon Altar.
- 200 BC – Mounds at the Hopewell Culture National Historical Park

=== 3rd Century BC ===
- 206 BC – The Great Wall of China is built
- 250 BC – The Lion Capital of Ashoka
- 300 BC – The Lohanipur torso and the Serpent Mound

=== 5th Century BC ===
- 440 BC – The Doryphoros
- 460 BC – The Riace bronzes.
- c. 500 BC – The Nazca Lines

=== 6th Century BC ===
- ? – Hanging Gardens of Babylon

=== 7th Century BC ===
- 700 BC – Sculptures at La Venta and Deer stones in Siberia.

=== 8th Century BC ===
- 722 BC – The Assyrian Timber Transportation relief
- 750 BC – The Euphrates Handmade Syrian Horses and Riders and Euphrates Syrian Pillar Figurines
- 800 BC – The Gleninsheen gorget and the production of Phoenician metal bowls

=== 9th Century BC ===
- 825 BC – The Black Obelisk of Shalmaneser III
- 900 BC – The Dowris Hoard and the Nimrud ivories

=== 10th Century BC ===
- 1000 BC – Olmec figurines, the Shropshire bulla, the rock carvings at Bidzar, the Da Yu ding, and the Da Ke ding

=== 2nd Millennium BC in art ===
- 1050 BC – The Dunaverney flesh-hook
- 1100 BC – The Stele of Untash Napirisha and the Chinese Ritual wine server
- 1200 BC – Stone sculptures at San Lorenzo Tenochtitlán
- 1264 BC – The Abu Simbel temples are founded.
- 1300 BC – The Caergwrle Bowl; the Treasure of Villena; the Nefertiti Bust; the death mask and throne of Tutankhamen; the Statue of Queen Napir-Asu; the Houmuwu ding
- 1370 BC – The Minoan Moulds of Palaikastro
- 1400 BC – Anon., Cosmetic Spoon: Young Girl Swimming; The Luxor Temple is built; the Mortuary Temple of Queen Hatshepsut; the astronomical ceiling of Senemut Tomb; statue of Thutmose III is built; La Parisienne, and the Hagia Triada Sarcophagus of Minoan Crete; the Trundholm sun chariot; the Langstrup belt plate
- 1450 BC – The Bull-Leaping Fresco, the Pylos Combat Agate, and the Palaikastro Kouros
- 1500 BC – The Mycenaean palace amphora with octopus, Mask of Agamemnon, the Theseus Ring, the Balkåkra Ritual Object, and the Sword of Ommerschans
- 1550 BC – Prince of the Lilies and the Minoan frescoes from Tell el-Dab'a
- 1600 BC – The Gold Diadem of Caravaca, the Minoan snake goddess figurines, the Minoan Bull-leaper, the Vaphio cups, the Da He ding, and the Shi zun
- 1650 BC – The Hüseyindede vases
- 1700 BC – Poverty Point constructed in Louisiana; the Akrotiri Boxer Fresco; the Rillaton Gold Cup
- 1750 BC – The Hove amber cup
- 1760 BC – The Pyramid of Khendjer
- 1791 BC – The Pyramid of Ameny Qemau
- 1796 BC – The Bust of Amenemhat V
- 1800 BC – The Nebra Sky Disc, the Sword of Jutphaas, the Malia Pendant, the Investiture of Zimri-Lim, the Thun-Renzenbühl axe, the Burney Relief, and the potbelly sculptures of Pre-Olmec Mesoamerica.
- 1802 BC – The Northern Mazghuna pyramid
- 1806 BC – The Southern Mazghuna pyramid and the Statue of Sobekneferu
- 1814 BC – The Black Pyramid
- 1839 BC – The Pyramid of Senusret III
- 1850 BC – The Aegina Treasure
- 1860 BC – The Pedestals of Biahmu
- 1878 BC – The Pyramid of Senusret II
- 1895 BC – The White Pyramid
- 1900 BC – Karnak Temple Complex; the Mold gold cape; the Bush Barrow gold lozenge
- 1926 BC – The Pyramid of Senusret I
- 1961 BC – William the Faience Hippopotamus
- 1962 BC – The Pyramid of Amenemhat I
- 2000 BC – Cashtal yn Ard, the Priest-King, Woman Riding Two Bulls, and the Angono Petroglyphs in the Philippines

=== 3rd Millennium BC in art ===
- 2049 BC – Seahenge
- 2050 BC – The Ziggurat of Ur, the Stela of the Gatekeeper Maati, the Limestone Statue of the Steward Mery, and the Limestone Stela of Tjetji
- 2090 BC – The Statue of Iddi-Ilum
- 2150 BC – The Saint-Bélec slab
- 2184 BC – The Pyramid of Pepi II
- 2200 BC – The Statues of Gudea and the Alaca Höyük bronze standards
- 2250 BC – The Bassetki Statue and the Victory Stele of Naram-Sin
- 2270 BC – The Statue of Manishtushu
- 2278 BC – The Pyramid of Merenre
- 2287 BC – The Pyramid of Pepi I
- 2300 BC – The Labbacallee wedge tomb, the Senegambian stone circles, the Hurrian foundation pegs, the Dancing Girl, the Anubanini rock relief, the Pömmelte ring sanctuary, and the Coggalbeg hoard
- 2333 BC – The Pyramid of Teti
- 2345 BC – The Pyramid of Unas
- 2350 BC – The Pashupati Seal
- 2385 BC – The Pyramid of Djedkare Isesi
- 2420 BC – The Headless Pyramid
- 2430 BC – The Pyramid of Nyuserre
- 2450 BC – The Statuette of Neferefre and the Pyramid of Neferefre
- 2455 BC – The Pyramid of Neferirkare
- 2475 BC – The Pyramid of Sahure
- 2490 BC – The Pyramid of Userkaf
- 2500 BC – The Statue of Ebih-Il; Silbury Hill is constructed; the Kernosivsky idol; the Mastabat al-Fir'aun
- 2510 BC – The Pyramid of Menkaure
- 2530 BC – The Unfinished Northern Pyramid of Zawyet El Aryan
- 2550 BC – The Great Sphinx of Giza, the Pyramid of Khafre, Khafre Enthroned, the Lyres of Ur, and the Bull Headed Lyre of Ur
- 2560 BC – The Pyramid of Djedefre and the Sphinx of Hetepheres II
- 2570 BC – The Great Pyramid of Giza and the Khufu Statuette
- 2575 BC – The Red Pyramid
- 2600 BC – Standard of Ur is created; Stele of the Vultures; Ram in a Thicket; the Tell al-'Ubaid Copper Lintel; the Copper Bull; the Bent Pyramid
- 2630 BC – The Layer Pyramid
- 2645 BC – The Buried Pyramid
- 2670 BC – The Pyramid of Djoser is built;
- 2800 BC – The Vučedol dove
- 2900 BC – The Tell Asmar Hoard and the Stele of Ushumgal
- 2985 BC – The MacGregor plaque
- 3000 BC – Stonehenge, King Orry's Grave, and Avebury are estimated to have been constructed; the Sieben Steinhäuser stones are erected; cave paintings at Dhambalin in Somalia; the Guennol Lioness; the Nevsha Stele

=== Neolithic ===
- 3100 BC – Mask of Warka, earliest surviving depiction of human face is built; Proto-Elamite Kneeling Bull with Vessel; the Battlefield Palette, the Bull Palette, the Hunters Palette, the Blau Monuments, the Scorpion Macehead, the Narmer Palette and the Narmer Macehead
- 3150 BC – The Tarxien Temples are built.
- 3200 BC – Newgrange and Knowth are formed; the Warka Vase
- 3300 BC – The Four Dogs Palette, the Tell Brak Head, and the Uruk Trough
- 3400 BC – The Bronocice pot
- 3450 BC – The Gebel el-Arak Knife
- 3500 BC – Rock paintings at Laas Geel; the El-Amra clay model of cattle; the Nahal Mishmar hoard in the Levant; Watson Brake in Louisiana
- 3600 BC – The Mnajdra on the isle of Malta; The Ġgantija temple on the island of Gozo; Rock art at Züschen
- 3700 BC – The Ħaġar Qim temple.
- 4000 BC – Rock paintings at Twyfelfontein; Creevykeel Court Tomb in Ireland; Rock art at Sabu-Jaddi
- 4200 BC – Poulnabrone dolmen is erected in Ireland; the Rock carvings at Alta are made
- 4500 BC – The Carnac stones are erected in France.
- 4700 BC – The Locmariaquer megaliths are erected in France.
- 4800 BC – The cairn of Barnenez and the Tumulus of Bougon
- 4900 BC – The Goseck Circle
- 5000 BC – Sydney rock engravings and the Stone circles of Hong Kong
- 5500 BC – The rock engravings of Oued Djerat
- 5700 BC – The Goddess on the Throne
- 6000 BC – The Bangudae Petroglyphs
- 7000 BC – Tradition of making Plaster Skulls in Jericho and 'Ain Ghazal in the Levant; rock paintings at the Tibesti Mountains
- 7500 BC – Stone circle at Nabta Playa
- 8000 BC – Paintings at Roca dels Moros, the Cueva de las Manos, and the Rock Drawings in Valcamonica; the rock paintings at Tadrart Rouge, the Coso Rock Art District, and the Apollo 11 Cave; the Edakkal caves petroglyphs; the Cooper Bison skull
- 9000 BC – Engraving of Dabous Giraffes in Niger; Göbekli Tepe; the Ain Sakhri figurine; rock paintings at Caverna da Pedra Pintada and the Toquepala Caves; Wurdi Youang; Urfa Man; the Venus of Monruz
- 10,000 BC – The Wolverine pendant of Les Eyzies; First paintings at Tassili n'Ajjer, the Bhimbetka rock shelters, Tambun cave, and the Gwion Gwion rock paintings; the Shigir Idol; the Robin Hood Cave Horse

=== Mesolithic ===
- 11,000 BC – Rock paintings at Matobo National Park
- 12,000 BC – The rock paintings at the Acacus Mountains

=== Upper Paleolithic ===
- 13,000 BC – Engravings in the Cave of the Trois-Frères, most notably The Sorcerer (cave art); Swimming Reindeer
- 15,000 BC – Paintings created at Lascaux and Creswell Crags
- 16,000 BC – Badanj Cave engravings
- 17,000 BC – Paintings at Grotte de Gabillou
- 19,000 BC – Rock paintings at Namadgi National Park
- 20,000 BC – Bison Licking Insect Bite created at la Madeleine in France; Venus of Laussel; The paintings at the Prehistoric Rock Art Sites in the Côa Valley, Siega Verde, Serra da Capivara, and the Gobustan State Historical and Cultural Reserve
- 21,000 BC – The Venus figurines of Mal'ta and the Venus of Buret'
- 22,000 BC – Cave paintings at Tsodilo and the Venus of Moravany
- 23,000 BC – The Venus of Savignano
- 25,000 BC – Venus of Brassempouy; the cave paintings of Pech Merle
- 26,000 BC – The Venus of Lespugue
- 27,000 BC – The paintings at Cosquer Cave.
- 28,000 BC – Venus of Willendorf and the Venus of Galgenberg; the paintings at the Caves of Arcy-sur-Cure, Gabarnmung, and HaYonim Cave
- 29,000 BC – The Venus of Dolní Věstonice
- 30,000 BC – paintings at Chauvet Cave in France; Löwenmensch figurine
- 35,600 BC – paintings at the Cave of Altamira; the Venus of Hohle Fels
- 40,000 BC – Mask of la Roche-Cotard created by neanderthal; Pre-Estuarine Tradition begins at Ubirr in northern Australia; cave paintings at Lubang Jeriji Saléh and the Caves in the Maros-Pangkep karst in Indonesia; the Adorant from the Geißenklösterle cave; and the figurines from Vogelherd Cave
- 45,000 BC – Rock paintings at Murujuga
- 50,000 BC – The Giant deer bone of Einhornhöhle

=== Middle Paleolithic ===
- 60,000 BC – The Divje Babe flute
- 64,000 BC – Paintings at the Cave of La Pasiega and the Cave of Maltravieso
- 80,000 BC – Nassarius shell necklace and engraved red ochre pencil at Blombos Cave, in South Africa

=== Lower Paleolithic ===
- 500,000 BC – Venus of Tan-Tan and Venus of Berekhat Ram sculpted
- 550,000 BC – The Pseudodon shell DUB1006-fL is possibly the oldest engraving by Homo Erectus.
