= 1140s in art =

- 1130s
- 1140s in art
- 1150s

Art timeline

The decade of the 1140s in art involved some significant events.

== Works ==
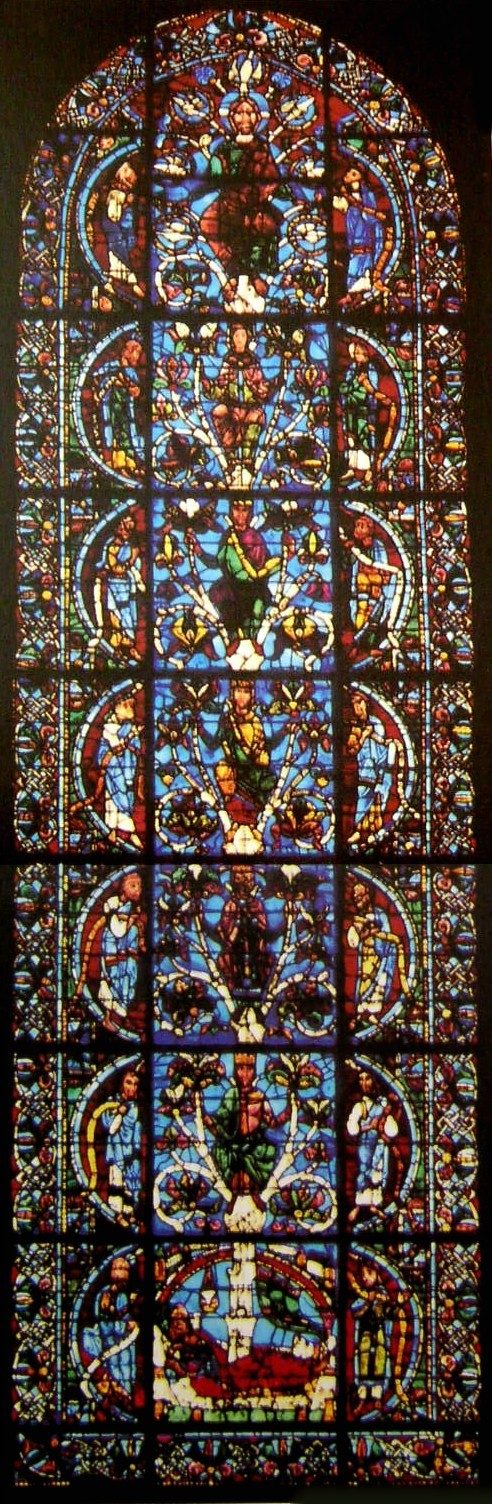
unknown artist, oldest known Jesse Tree window, Chartres Cathedral, France, 1145

- 1145: oldest known Jesse Tree window completed
- 1148: The illuminated manuscript Parc Abbey Bible was completed

== Births ==
- 1140: Liang Kai - Chinese painter, also known as Madman Liang, (died 1210)
- 1142: Fujiwara Takanobu – Japanese nise-e painter (died 1205)

== Deaths ==
- 1145: Zhang Zeduan – Chinese painter during the transitional period from the Northern Song to the Southern Song Dynasty (born 1085)
- 1142: Yue Fei - Chinese military general and calligrapher (born 1103)
- 1140: Toba Sōjō – Japanese astronomer and artist-monk, said to be the artist of the famous picture scroll Chōjū-giga (born 1053)
