= 19th century (disambiguation) =

The 19th century of the Common Era began on 1 January 1801 and ended on 31 December 1900, according to the Gregorian calendar.

19th century or Nineteenth century may also refer to:

- 19th century BC
- The Nineteenth Century (periodical), a British monthly literary magazine
