= Le Corbeau (artist) =

French artist (born 1954)

François Guillemin (born 1954), known professionally as le Corbeau, is an artist whose decorative arts career began at age 14. His works have encompassed jewelry, sculpture, public art, and studio furniture.

Awards include 2nd Place Grand Prize Award for "An Angel in Despair" in the 2010 "Wind Through the Trees" 1-year outdoor exhibition at Jenkins Arboretum, Devon, PA; First place in the 1987 Fortunoff 3rd Annual Silver Competition for "Architectural Farce"; a Fellowship Grant for Sculpture in 1985 from the New Jersey State Council on the Arts; and First place in the 1975 Texas National Arts and Crafts Competition.

In 2013, Le Corbeau was commissioned to design and create the kinetic sculpture "Remembrance of Gifts Past" for the newly completed University Medical Center of Princeton at Plainsboro for its Punia Family Healing Garden. In 2012, the Borough of Hopewell, NJ commissioned le Corbeau to design and create a series of Welcome to Hopewell signs. His first public art commission was in 2006, for the Borough of Princeton, New Jersey, to design and fabricate tree grates for the Albert E. Hinds Memorial Plaza in downtown Princeton. His first solo exhibition was "The Pleasures of Mystery: Sculpture by le Corbeau” at the Trenton (New Jersey) State Museum in 1986. In 2012, "Naturally, Man-Made, In Full View: the art of le Corbeau" at Ellarslie, The Trenton City Museum, offered a retrospective exhibit including recent works. His sculpture "Doree" was purchased and then donated to Ursinus College by collector/philanthropist Philip Berman.

Le Corbeau's work is characteristically Surrealist in that he most often assembles "found objects" into provocative relationships creating three-dimensional metaphors. Like many traditional Surrealists, le Corbeau is seduced by the beauty of the objects he chooses, and when asked whether his motives were aesthetic over metaphoric, he insisted they were equally important.

Le Corbeau's father Roger Guillemin is known primarily for his research at the Salk Institute and for his 1977 Nobel Prize.

Le Corbeau built Firedance Studio in Hopewell, New Jersey, to house a metal works facility and staff engaged in creating le Corbeau's artwork and decorative metal projects for architects and interior designers.

== Sources ==
- Pucell, Janet. "Le Corbeau shows off his work at his Firedance Studio". The Times of Trenton, July 11, 2014
- Ippolito, Amanda. "One of five new 'Welcome to Hopewell Borough' signs created by local artist". The Times of Trenton, May 5, 2014
- Mowad, Michelle. "Roger Guillemin and le Corbeau: Father and Son". La Jolla Patch, May 31, 2012
- Aubrey, Dan. "Three Artists, Three Exhibits, Three Days". U.S.1, October 3, 2012
- Yearly, Alexandra. "They call him The Crow". Hopewell Express, October 2010
- Sanders, Erin Murphy. "Something to Crow About". Princeton Magazine, April 2008
- Parris, Susan. "'The Crow' Exhibits at WW Art Event". West Windsor & Plainsboro News, February 8, 2008
- Innes, Edith Cullen. The State Museum, Catalogue "le Corbeau" About the Artist. November 1986
- Dube, Ilene. "Heavy Metal: The Fine Art Alchemists of Hopewell". U.S.1, June 15, 2011
- McNamara, Gwen. "Kit of Parts". Packet Magazine, April/May 2010
- Dube, Ilene. "Woodsy Acres". Packet Magazine, April/May 2010
- Stern, Robert. "Town Sees a Grate as Lovely as a Tree". The Times of Trenton, July 2004
- Dube, Ilene. "Flight of the Crow: Sculptor Francois Guillemin opens Firedance Studio with Cabaret Kiki". TIMEOFF, October 2007
