= 1180s in art =

- 1170s
- 1180s in art
- 1190s

Art timeline

The decade of the 1180s in art involved some significant events.

== Events ==
- 1185: The Comnenian Age of Byzantine art comes to an end when the Komnenian dynasty lose power

== Works ==
- 1183: Unkei transcribes two copies of the Lotus Sutra (calligraphy)
- 1189: Kōkei sculpts Four Heavenly Kings in Kōfuku-ji

== Births ==
- 1180: Giunta Pisano – Italian painter (died 1258)

== Deaths ==
- 1189: Lin Tinggui – Chinese painter of the Southern Song dynasty (born 1127)
- 1182: Zhao Boju – Chinese landscape and flower painter of the Southern Song dynasty (died 1120)
