= 1150s in art =

- 1140s
- 1150s in art
- 1160s

Art timeline

The decade of the 1150s in art involved some significant events.

== Works ==
- 1156: Stavelot Triptych created by Mosan artists

== Births ==
- 1151: Unkei – Japanese sculptor (died 1223)
- 1150: Benedetto Antelami – Italian architect and sculptor of the Romanesque school (died 1230)
