= 1250s in art =

- 1240s
- 1250s in art
- 1260s
Other topics in 1250s:
- Music

Art timeline

The decade of the 1250s in art involved some significant events.

== Works ==
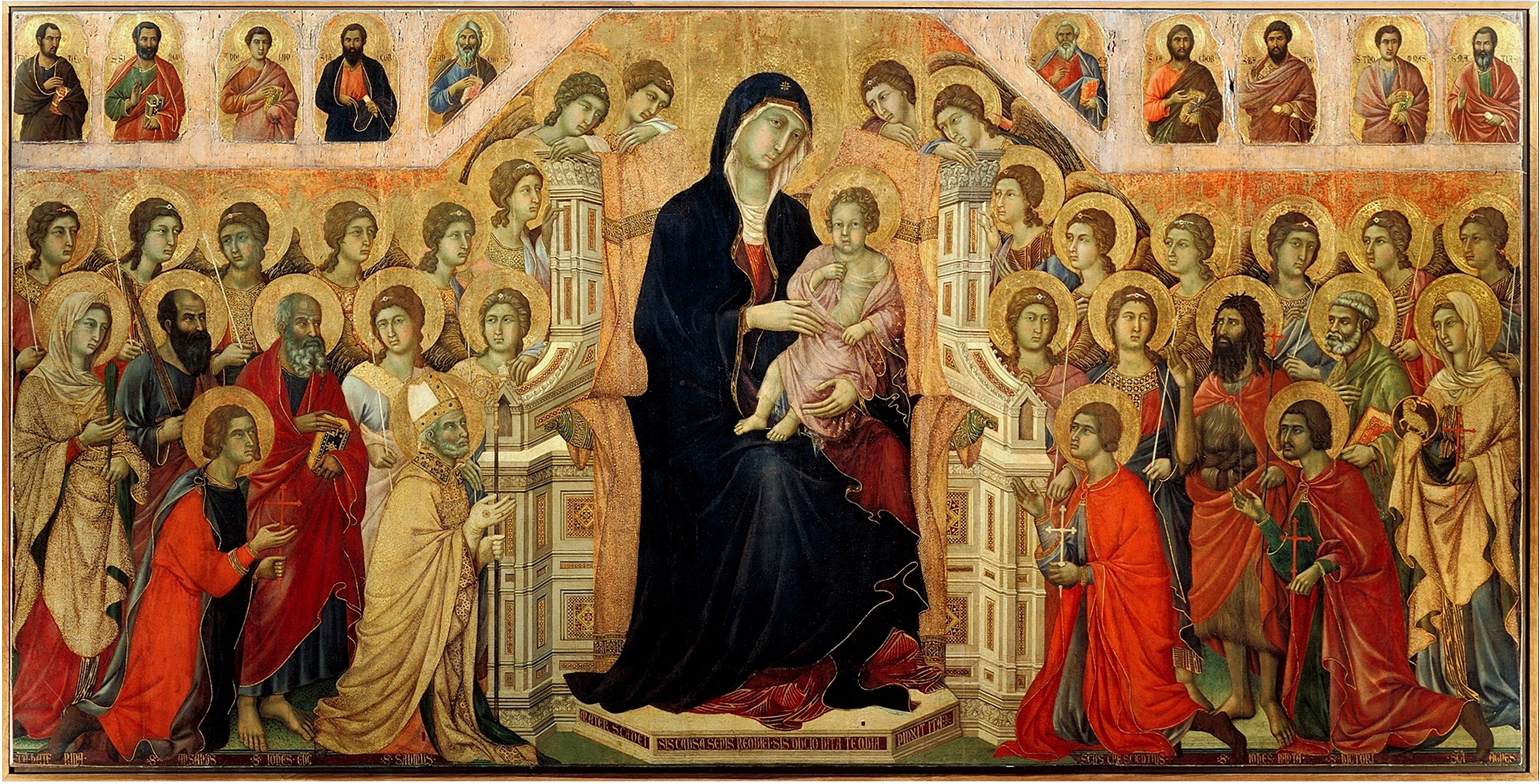
Duccio Maestà with Twenty Angels and Nineteen Saints
- c.1250: The doorway from Moutiers-Saint-Jean is carved
- 1250: The illuminated manuscript Morgan Bible is completed
- 1251: Kei school sculptor produces Tamayori-bime statue in Yoshino Mikumari Shrine
- 1251–1254: Tankei sculpts a Thousand-armed Kannon at Sanjūsangen-dō

== Births ==
- 1250: Giovanni Pisano, Italian sculptor, painter and architect (died 1315)
- 1254
  - Ren Renfa, Chinese painter of horses, people, flowers and birds (died 1327)
  - Zhao Mengfu, Chinese scholar, painter and calligrapher during the Yuan Dynasty (died 1322)
- c.1255
  - Duccio, Italian artist, influential in his time (died 1318/19)
  - Filippo Rusuti, Italian painter and mosaicist (died 1325)
- 1259: Pietro Cavallini, Italian painter and mosaic designer working during the late Middle Ages (died c.1330)

== Deaths ==
- 1256: Tankei, Japanese sculptor of the Kei school (born 1173)
- circa 1258: Giunta Pisano, Italian painter (born 1180)
