= 1200s in art =

- 1190s
- 1200s in art
- 1210s
Other topics in 1200s:
- Music

Art timeline

The decade of the 1200s in art involved some significant events.

== Art ==
- 1200: Kaikei sculpts Mahamayuri in Kimpusen-ji, an Important Cultural Property of Japan.
- 1201: Kaikei sculpts Hachiman in Tōdai-ji, a National Treasure of Japan
- 1203: Kaikei with Unkei sculpts Nio in Tōdai-ji, a National Treasure of Japan
- 1205: The Legend of the Seven Sleepers of Ephesus – stained glass done for Rouen Cathedral
- 1205: Stone jamb figures done for Chartres Cathedral
- 1206: Unknown artist sculpts Priest Chōgen in Tōdai-ji
- 1207: Twelve different artists sculpt Twelve Heavenly Generals in Kōfuku-ji
- 1208: Unkei sculpts Muchaku in Kōfuku-ji

== Deaths ==
- 1205: Nicholas of Verdun – French goldsmith and enamellist of the Middle Ages (born 1130)
- 1205: Fujiwara Takanobu – Japanese nise-e painter (died 1142)
