= 1190s in art =

- 1180s
- 1190s in art
- 1200s

Art timeline

The decade of the 1190s in art involved some significant events.

== Works ==
- 1192: Kaikei sculpts Maitreya in Sanbō-in, an Important Cultural Property of Japan.
- 1194: Kaikei sculpts Vairocana in Ishiyama-dera, an Important Cultural Property of Japan
- 1194: Rebuilding of Chartres Cathedral begins after the fire.
- 1195: Kaikei sculpts Amitābha Triad in Jōdo-ji, a National Treasure of Japan
- 1196: Jōkei sculpts Yuima in Kōfuku-ji
- 1196: Unknown Kei school artist sculpts Monju Bosatsu in Kōfuku-ji
- 1197: Unkei sculpts Fudo Myoo in Kongōbu-ji

== Births ==
- 1195: Xia Gui – Chinese scroll painter of the Song dynasty, great master of the Southern Song landscape style (d. 1224)

== Deaths ==
- 1197: Li Di – Chinese imperial court painter (b. 1100)
