= Parc Abbey Bible =

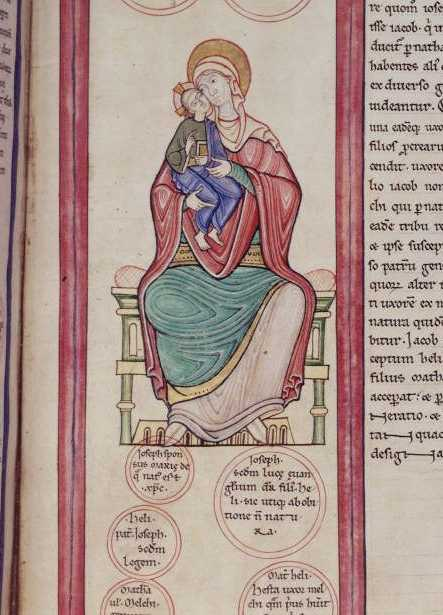
The Virgin and Child from folio 20r of the Parc Abbey Bible.

The Parc Abbey Bible (London, British Library, Add. MS 14788, 14789, and 14790) is a 12th-century illuminated Bible. It was made in the Leuven region of Belgium at the Abbey of St. Mary of Parc. A colophon on folio 197 indicates that the codex was produced in 1148. The text is Latin and written in proto-gothic book script on vellum. The folios are 437 by 300 mm, with the text block being 340 by 240 mm. The manuscript is illuminated with miniatures, diagrams, decorated borders, and decorated initials. The decorated initials include historiated, inhabited, and foliate initials.

The Bible was purchased by the British Library in 1844. It is now kept in three volumes. The first volume (Add. MS 14788) contains the Pentateuch, Joshua, Judges, Ruth, Job, Tobit, Judith, Esther, I Ezra, 2 Ezra, and Nehemiah. The second volume (Add. MS 14789) contains Kings, Chronicles, Wisdom and Maccabees The third volume (Add. MS 14790) contains Isaiah, Jeremiah, Lamentations, Ezekiel, Daniel, the minor prophets, and the New Testament.
