= Wolverine pendant of Les Eyzies =

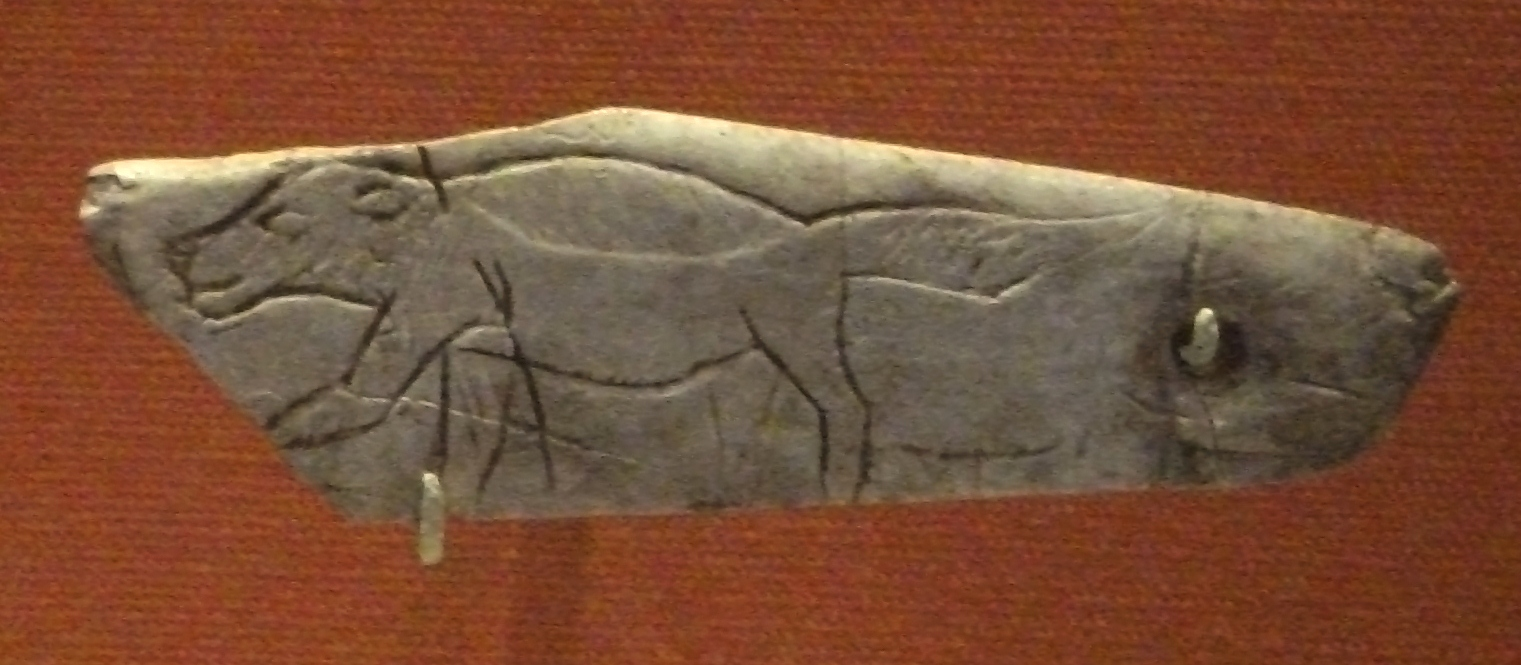
- The Wolverine pendant of Les Eyzies
- Material: Bone
- Created: 12,500 years
- Discovered: Before 2011; France
- Present location: London, England, United Kingdom
- Registration: Palart 102

The Wolverine pendant of Les Eyzies is a bone pendant decorated with an engraved drawing of a wolverine, probably from the cave of Les Eyzies, Dordogne, France. The pendant is from the late Magdalenian period and around 12,500 years old. It now forms part of the Christy Collection in the British Museum (Palart 102), where it is normally on display in Room 2. Between 7 February - 26 May 2013 it was displayed in the exhibition at the British Museum Ice Age Art: Arrival of the Modern Mind

== Features ==
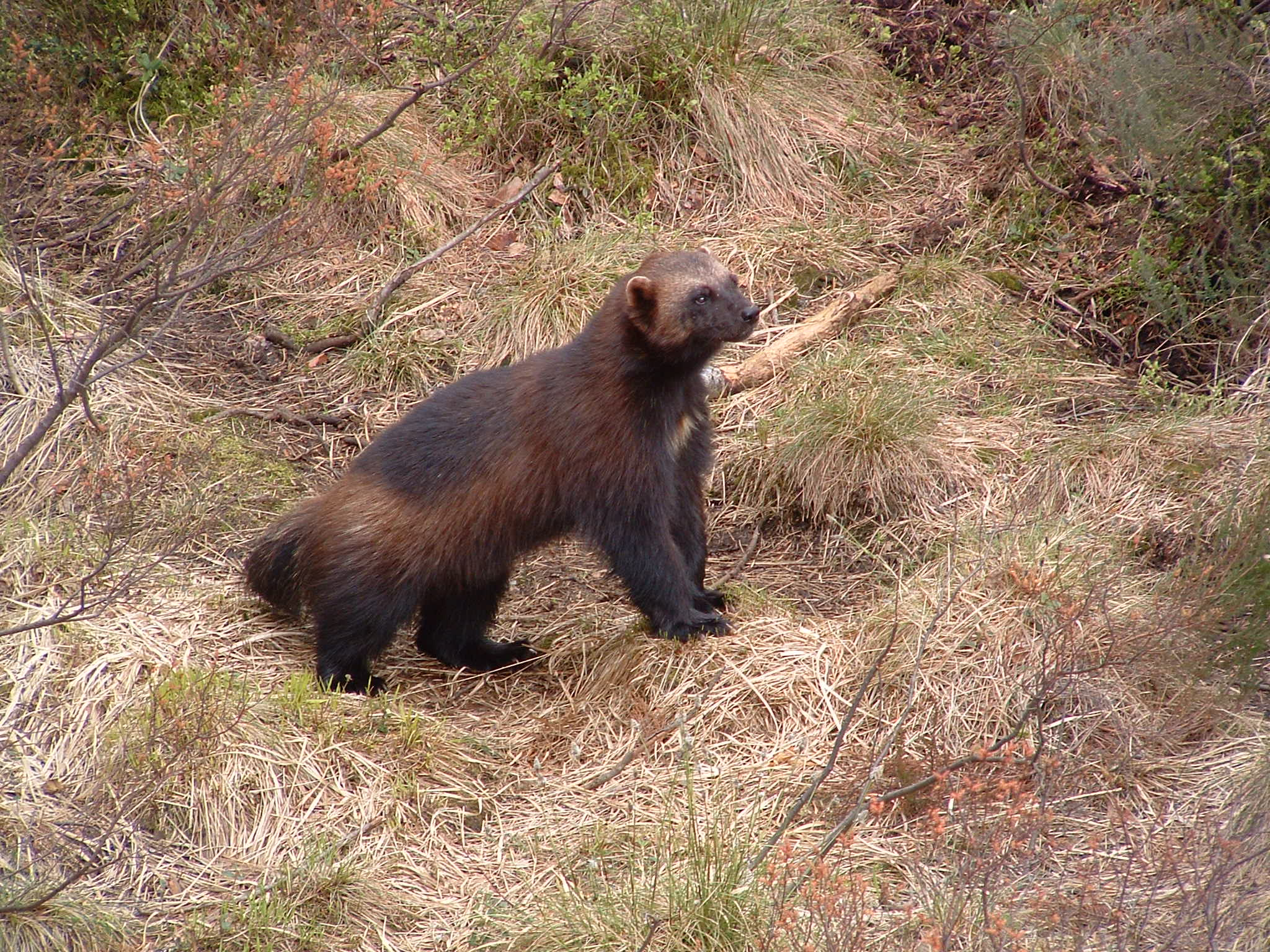
An Old World wolverine (gulo gulo gulo) in a zoo in Norway

The pendant is made from a shaped bone, about 1.5 mm thick. There is a hole at one end to enable it to be worn on a string as a pendant or part of a necklace. It may also have been suspended on other things, such as posts. Both sides are smooth. The pendant has an engraving of a wolverine featuring a distinctive bear-like face, pointed nose, small ears, heavy body and hairy paws. It appears to be walking to the left. There is a diagonal line across the animal's shoulder which may be a spear. The pendant is broken and it is possible that the missing piece showed another figure.

No longer widespread, at the time of the last Ice Age, the wolverine was a competitor with humans for food sources. They were also a useful source of fur - especially as the fur is naturally resistant to frost.

== See also ==
- Prehistoric art
