= 1130s in art =

- 1120s
- 1130s in art
- 1140s
Other topics in 1130s:

The decade of the 1130s in art involved some significant events.

== Works ==
- 1135: Illuminated manuscript Melisende Psalter published
- 1135: The Illuminated manuscript Bury St Edmunds Bible by Master Hugo completed
- 1130: Figure of the Prophet Jeremiah from the pillar of the portal of the Abbey of Saint-Pierre, Moissac, France

== Births ==
- 1130: Nicholas of Verdun – French goldsmith and enamellist of the Middle Ages (died 1205)

== Deaths ==
- 1135: Emperor Huizong of Song – Chinese emperor of the Song dynasty who was also a skilled poet, painter, calligrapher, and musician (born 1082)
- 1130: Li Tang – Chinese landscape painter (born c.1050)
