= Christian Bernard (art curator) =

French art curator (1950–2026)

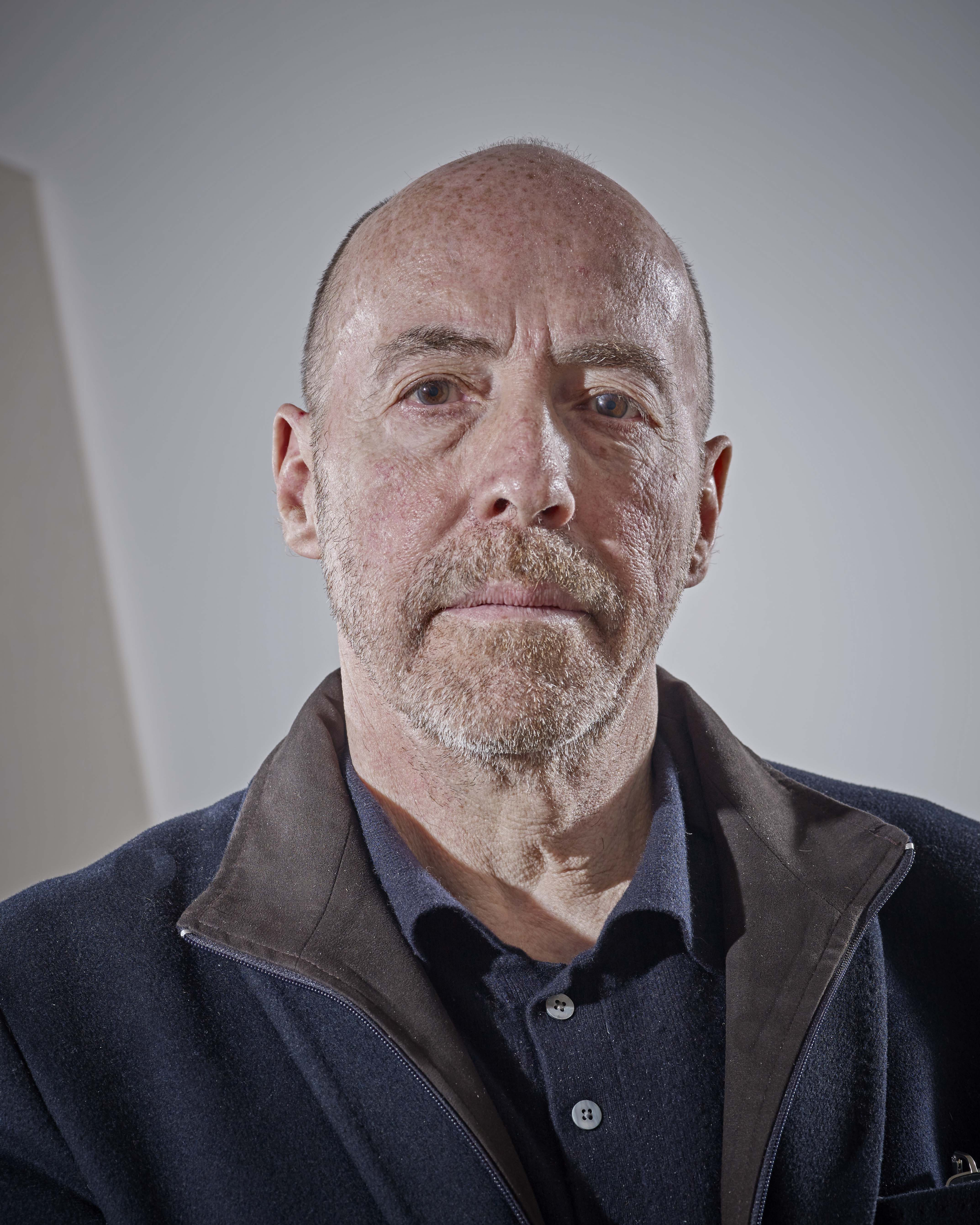
- Bernard in 2015
- Born: 9 February 1950; Strasbourg, France
- Died: 6 August 2026 (aged 76)
- Education: University of Strasbourg
- Occupation: Art curator

Christian Bernard (French: [kʁistjˈɑ̃ bɛʁnˈaʁ]; 9 February 1950 – 6 August 2026) was a French art curator.

== Life and career ==
Born in Strasbourg on 9 February 1950, Bernard studied philosophy and letters at the University of Strasbourg before become director of the Villa Arson in Nice. On 22 September 1994, he was named director of MAMCO in Geneva, the first person to hold the title. He notably worked alongside John Armleder and Martin Kippenberger. In addition to his work in Geneva, he oversaw artistic director for Line B of the Strasbourg tramway and Île-de-France tramway lines 3a and 3b. In 2009, he curated the Claude Lévêque exhibition at the Venice Biennale. In 2008 and 2009, he was artistic director of the Printemps de septembre festival in Toulouse. Throughout his career, he published many texts, including his reflections on the uncertain future of MAMCO and his commentary on the nature of exhibitions within the museum context.

Bernard died on 6 August 2026, at the age of 76.

== Publications ==
- H (1968)
- Petite Forme (2012)
- Élégie (2013)
- Feux de position (2021)
- Fabules (2022)
