= Luo Mu =

Chinese painter and writer (1622–1706)

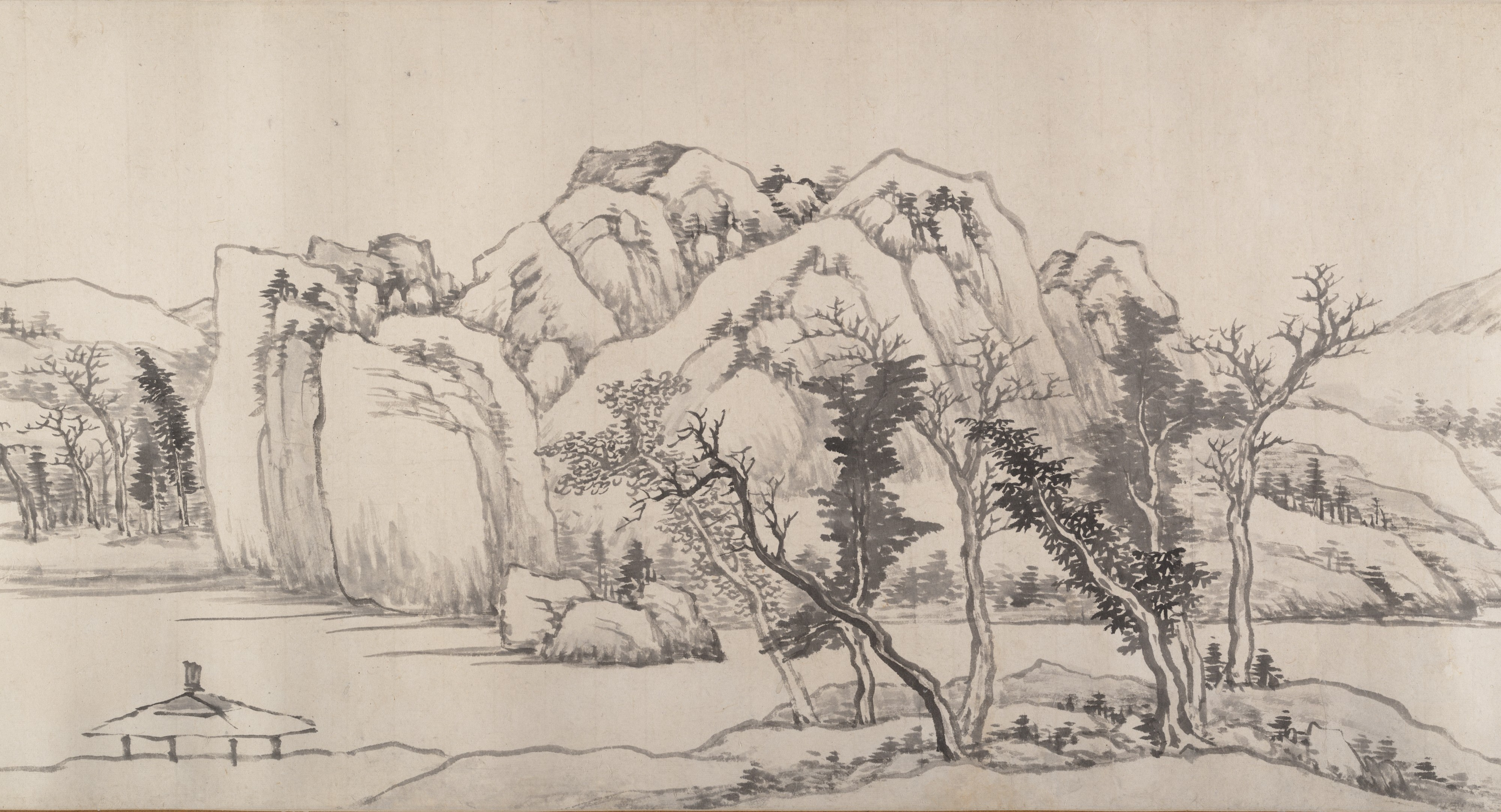
Handscroll made by Luo Mu

Luo Mu (1622–1706) was a painter, poet and prose writer born in Jiangxi. He spent most of his life in the capital Nanchang. He was noted for his landscape paintings, especially of mountains, and for what would be termed "The JiangXi Style". His personality was said to be convivial and he counted Xu Yuxi amongst his friends.

== Sources ==
- Chinese Paintings in the Ashmolean Museum Oxford(100) Oxford ISBN 1-85444-132-9
- China on-site
