= Mycenaean palace amphora with octopus (NAMA 6725) =

Ancient Mycenaean amphora

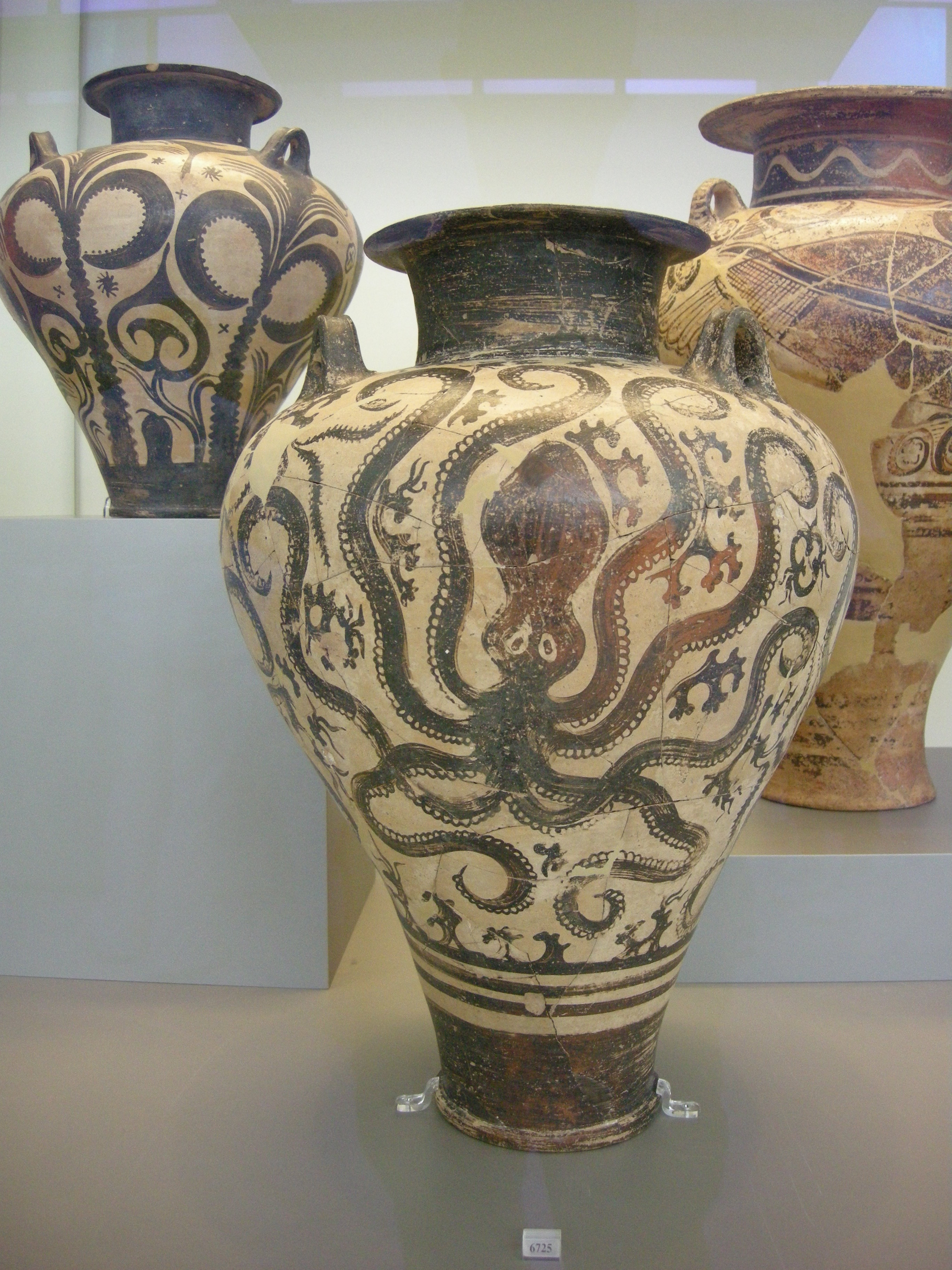

The Mycenaean palace amphora with octopus in the National Archaeological Museum of Athens (NAMA) with inventory number Π 6725 is dated to the 15th century BC. It was found in the second grave of the Mycenaean cemetery at Prosymna, near Argos.

It is a three-handled amphora, which belongs to the category of the so-called Palace amphorae, which arrived in the Greek mainland in the Late Helladic II and was heavily influenced by Minoan palace amphorae. It is decorated with a sea-themed scene, with rocks, seaweed, and three large octopuses, whose long tentacles wind around the whole vase. The work is attributed to a Mycenaean vase painter who was working entirely within the tradition of "Marine Style" Cretan Minoan vase painting.
