= Shi zun =

Ancient Chinese ritual bronze zun vessel

- 豕尊
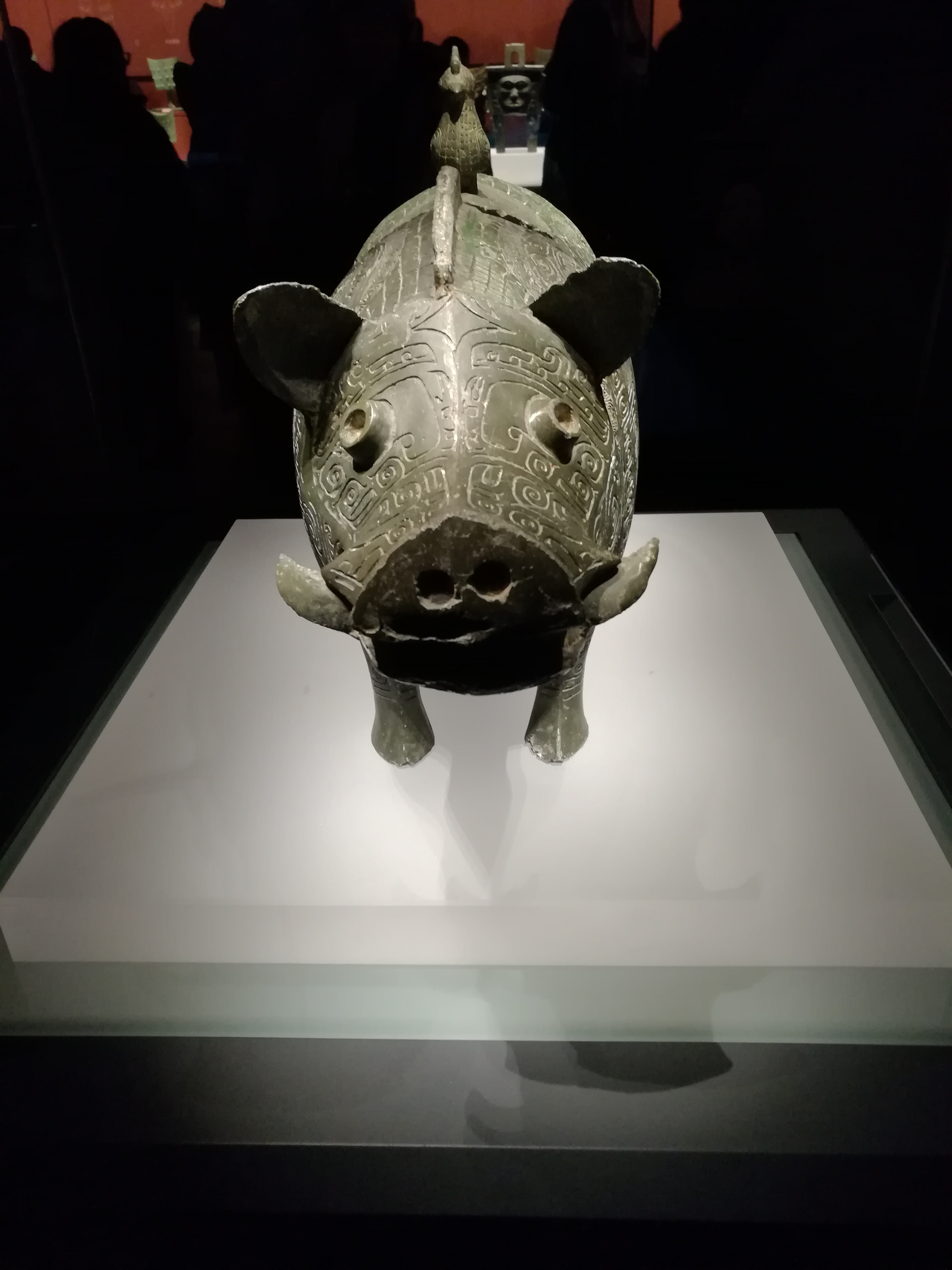
- The Shi zun is exhibited in the Hunan Museum.
- Material: Bronze
- Length: 72-centimetre (28 in)
- Height: 40-centimetre (16 in)
- Weight: 30-kilogram (66 lb)
- Created: Shang dynasty (1600–1046 BC)
- Discovered: 1981; Chuanxingshan, Xiangtan County, Hunan, China
- Discovered by: Zhu Guiwu (朱桂武)
- Present location: Hunan Museum

Shi zun (Chinese: 豕尊; pinyin: Shǐ Zūn) is an ancient Chinese ritual bronze zun vessel, shaped like a boar, from the late Shang dynasty (1600–1046 BC). It was excavated in 1981 from Chuanxingshan, Xiangtan County, Hunan and now is preserved in the Hunan Museum.

== Description ==
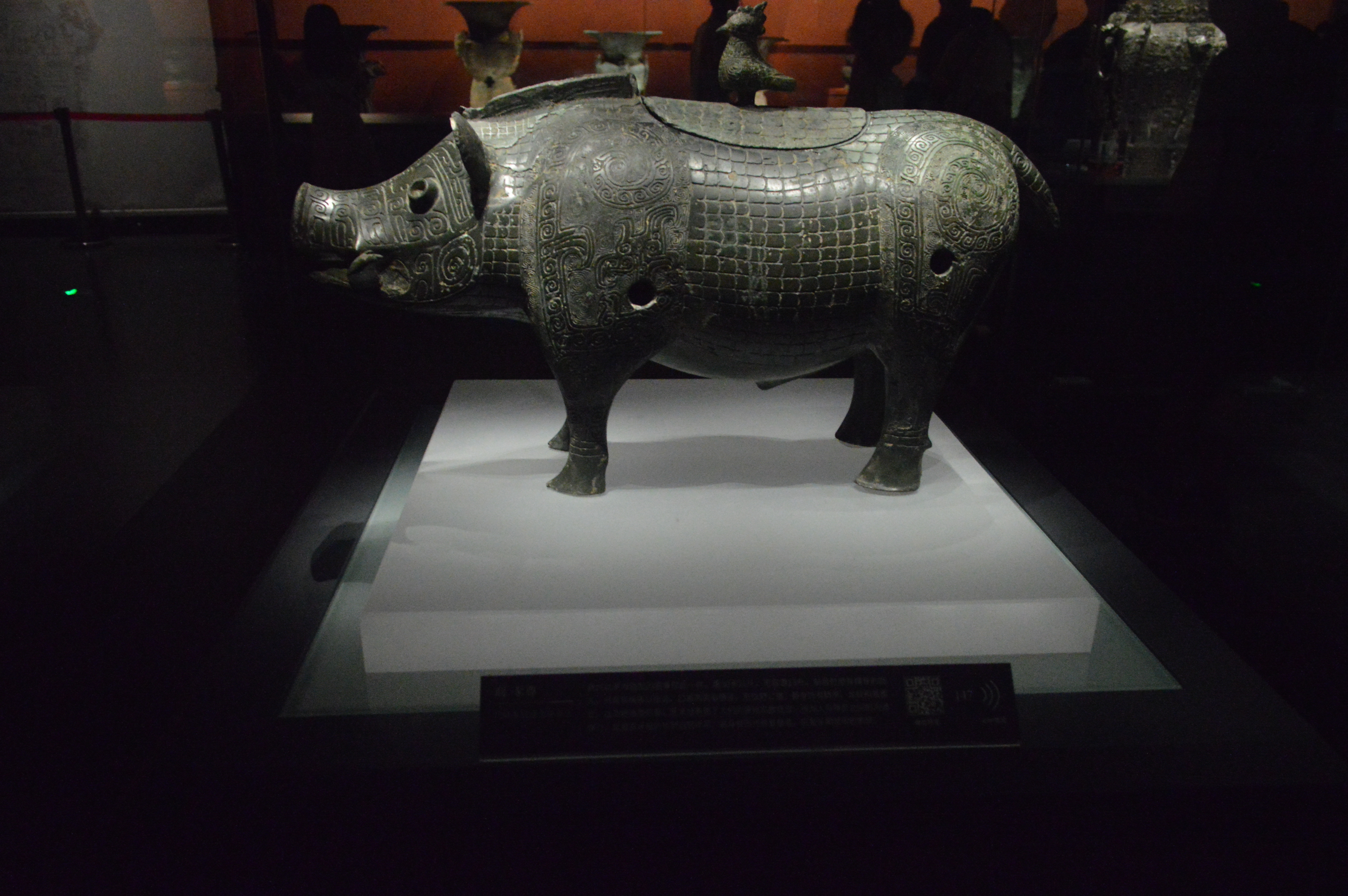
Shi zun.

The Shi zun is 72-centimetre (28 in) long, 40-centimetre (16 in) high and weighs 30-kilogram (66 lb). It is shaped like a wild boar with two tusks. It has an oval opening on the top and a hollow interior. Its whole body is decorated with patterns of scutes, clouds, dragons and animal faces.

== Function ==
A zun is a kind of wine vessel. There are many theories about why it is made from bronze, including to exorcise evil spirits, to please the gods, or as a medium of communication between man and gods.

== Discovery ==
In early 1981, Zhu Guiwu (朱桂武), a Hunanese villager from Chuanxingshan of Xiangtan County, discovered the Shi zun when he dug the foundation of his new house. It was identified by the cultural relics department as a Shang dynasty Chinese ritual bronze zun vessel.
