= 19th century BC =

One hundred years, from 1900 BC to 1801 BC

The 19th century BC was the century that lasted from 1900 BC to 1801 BC.

== Events ==
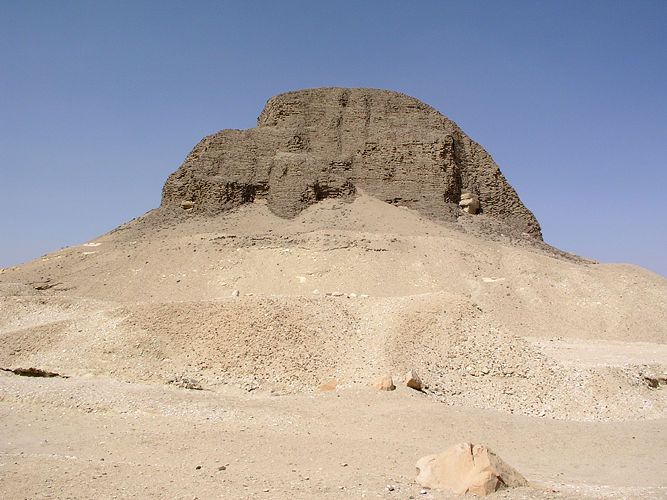
Pyramid of Senusret II at El-Lahun. He was a Twelfth Dynasty Pharaoh

- c. 1900 BC: Transition from Early Helladic III to Middle Helladic culture in Greece.
- c. 1900 BC: Minoan Old Palace (Protopalatial) period starts in Crete.
- c. 1900 BC: Fall of last Sumerian dynasty.
- c. 1900 BC: Late Harappan phase of the Indus Valley civilization begins
- c. 1900 BC: The Mokaya along the Pacific coast of present-day Chiapas, Mexico were preparing cacao beverages.
- c. 1900 BC: Port of Lothal is abandoned.
- c. 1897 BC: Senwosret II (Twelfth Dynasty) started to rule. He built Kahun near his pyramid tomb complex at el-Lahun.
- c. 1895 BC–1878 BC: "Pectoral of Senwosret II", from the tomb of princess Sithathoryunet at el-Lahun was made. Twelfth Dynasty. It is now in the Metropolitan Museum of Art, New York.
- c. 1880 BC: Pharaoh Senwosret II starts to rule (other date is 1897 BC).
- 1878 BC: Senwosret II (Twelfth Dynasty) died.
- c. 1878 BC: Senwosret III (Twelfth Dynasty) started to rule.
- c. 1874 BC: Pharaoh Senwosret II dies (other date is 1878 BC).
- c. 1874 BC: Pharaoh Senwosret III starts to rule (other date is 1878 BC).
- c. 1860 BC: Senusret III inspects the Nubian frontier, he leads four punitive campaigns against the Nubians.
- c. 1860 BC: Amenemhat III starts to rule
- c. 1855 BC: Pharaoh Senwosret III dies (other date is 1839 BC).
- c. 1839 BC: Senwosret III (Twelfth Dynasty) died.
- 1836 BC-1818 BC: Head of Senusret III is made. Twelfth dynasty of Egypt. It is now kept at The Nelson-Atkins Museum of Art, Kansas City, Missouri.
- Bön founder Tonpa Shenrab Miwoche dies at age 82
- c. 1825 BC: The oldest known medical text in Egyptian history, the Kahun Gynaecological Papyrus, is written.
- c. 1808 BC: Amorite Shamshi-Adad I founds the Kingdom of Upper Mesopotamia
