= Philip and Muriel Berman =

American art collectors, philanthropists

Philip and Muriel Berman were American art collectors, philanthropists, and the founders of the Berman Art Museum at Ursinus College in Collegeville, Pennsylvania. Phillip was the chairman of the Philadelphia Museum of Art and Muriel was an honorary member of the board. They endowed many Jewish charities including Hadassah as well commissioning and funding the "Philip and Muriel Berman sculpture park" in Allentown, Pennsylvania, where they resided. Phil made his fortune with a trucking empire and later as the owner of the department store chain Hess's headquartered in Allentown. Muriel Berman was an optometrist.

== Philip ==
Philip Berman (June 28, 1915 - November 26, 1997) acquired the Hess's department stores in 1968. He graduated from Ursinus College in Collegeville, Pennsylvania, and later founded the eponymous "Berman Art Museum" there with his wife Muriel with a large gift from their own personal collection. He later became chairman of the board of trustees of the Philadelphia Museum of Art.

== Muriel ==
Muriel Mallin Berman (b. in Pittsburgh, Pennsylvania - d. April 13, 2004) was an optometrist and philanthropist, and the co-founder of the Berman Art Museum at Ursinus College. She studied at the University of Pittsburgh and what is now Carnegie Mellon University, and graduated from the Pennsylvania College of Optometry.

In 1975, she was a delegate to the United Nations International Women's Year Conference held in Mexico City. She kept her optometrist's licence until the 1980s.
