= 2023 in art =

The year 2023 in art involved various significant events.

== Events ==
- February - The Joan Mitchell foundation issues a cease and desist letter to Louis Vuitton to stop using Joan Mitchell's paintings as the backdrop in one of the advertising campaigns for their signature handbags, saying that it is unauthorized and improper usage.
- February 16 - A woman attending the Art Wynwood art fair in the Wynwood section of Miami, Florida taps a limited edition porcelain Jeff Koons Balloon Dog sculpture displayed at the Bel-Air Fine Art booth, knocking it to the floor and shattering it into many many pieces and shards. There was no "Break it You Buy It" policy at the temporary gallery outpost and it was covered by insurance.
- March - The Vatican Museums returns three historic 2,500 year old sculptures from the Parthenon in Athens to Greece.
- March 29 - The German born Belgian art collector and patron Myriam Ullens is shot dead allegedly by her stepson, Nicolas Ullens de Schooten Whettnall.
- May - American visual artist and academic Shellyne Rodriguez has online and in-person confrontations in New York City with anti-abortion activists and when a New York Post reporter tries to interview her at her home she threatens him with a machete. She is then dismissed from her position as a professor at Hunter College, arrested and charged with menacing and harassment.
- May 28 - A statue of William B. Gould by Pablo Eduardo is unveiled in Dedham, Massachusetts.
- June 27 - Gustav Klimt's last painting, Lady with a Fan (Dame mit Fächer, 1918), is sold by Sotheby's in London for UK£85.3M (US$108.4) to a Hong Kong collector, the highest-priced artwork ever sold at auction in Europe.
- September - Édouard Manet's Olympia comes to the U.S. for the very first time as part of the exhibition Manet/Degas, a show which originated at the famed work's home, the Musée d'Orsay in Paris.
- October 6 - An American tourist visiting Israel throws two second century Roman statues to the floor in the Israel Museum damaging them and is subsequently arrested. Upon questioning by Israeli police the vandal said that he considered them “to be idolatrous and contrary to the Torah.”
- November 8 - The collection of Emily Fisher Landau (1920-2023) sets a record for the highest total proceeds ever obtained at auction from the sale of a collection of a female collector, 406 million $US at Sotheby's in New York City. The sale includes Pablo Picasso's Femme à la montre (1932), which changed hands for 121 million $US, the second highest price ever achieved at auction for a work by Picasso after Les Femmes d'Alger (1955), which sold for 179.4 million $US in 2015, then a record for a painting sold at auction.
- November - The missing painting by Sandro Botticelli, Madonna delle Grazie, is recovered in the Italian town of Gragnano.
- December
  - Australian artist Mike Parr is dropped by his longtime representative the Anna Schwartz Gallery in Melbourne after staging a performance and installation where he placed the words "Israel" and "Palestine" on a wall.
  - Departing the booth he curated at Art Miami during Art Basel Miami Beach week art dealer Rodrigo Salomon leaves a small painting by Bartolomé Esteban Murillo (1618-1682), "Madonna and Child" valued at between 500,000 and 1 million $US in a Lyft vehicle before it can be retrieved from the trunk and the driver speeds away with the painting in the hold. The painting is subsequently returned.

== Exhibitions ==
- January 26 until April 16 - Beyond the Light: Identity and Place in Nineteenth-Century Danish Art at the Metropolitan Museum of Art in New York City.
- February 1 until April 30 - ''The Art of Banksy Without Limits'' in São Paulo, Brazil then travels to Queens Plaza in Brisbane, Australia from May 3 until July 9
- February 18 until June 4 - Pop Masters: Art from the Mugrabi Collection, New York at the Home of the Arts at the Gold Coast, Queensland
- March 2 until June 4 - Wangechi Mutu: Intertwined at the New Museum in New York City.
- March 3 until August 15 - The Sassoons at the Jewish Museum in New York City.
- March 7 until August 27 - Picasso Celebration: The Collection in a New Light at the Musée Picasso in Paris, France.
- March 8 until March 23 - Never Above 14th Street (Jean-Michel Basquiat, Martin Wong, Keith Haring, Futura, Crash, Lady Pink, Linus Corragio, David Wojnarowicz, Dondi White, and Mike Bidlo: curated by Scott Nussbaum) at Phillips in New York City.
- March 18 until October 15 - Kehinde Wiley: An Archeology of Silence at the De Young Museum in San Francisco, California.
- March 28 until July 23 - Manet / Degas at the Musée d'Orsay in Paris, France. then traveled to the Metropolitan Museum of Art in New York City from September 26 until January 7, 2024.
- March 31 until September 10 - Gego: Measuring Infinity at the Solomon R. Guggenheim Museum in New York City.
- March 31 until September 10 - Sarah Sze: Timelapse at the Solomon R. Guggenheim Museum in New York City.
- April 3 until July 16 - Juan de Pareja: Afro-Hispanic Painter at the Metropolitan Museum of Art in New York City.
- April 4 until December 3 - Cecily Brown: Death and the Maid at the Metropolitan Museum of Art in New York City.
- April 12 until May 26 - Bonnard: The Experience of Seeing at Acquavella Galleries in New York City.
- April 13 until July 28 - Mark Bradford: You Don't Have to Tell Me Twice at Hauser & Wirth in New York City.
- April 18 until June 1 - Rear View at LGDR in New York City.
- May 1 until May 31 - Bruce Breland's Mixed Bag: Art-i-Facts of a Wonderful Life in Art2 at Unsmoke Systems Artspace in Braddock, Pennsylvania.
- May 5 until October 8 - The Encounter: Barbara Chase-Riboud/Alberto Giacometti at MoMA in New York City.
- May 12 until August 6 - Young Picasso in Paris at the Solomon R. Guggenheim Museum in New York City.
- May 22 until August 27 - Van Gogh's Cypresses at the Metropolitan Museum of Art in New York City.
- May 31 until September 3 - Moki Cherry: Here and Now at ICA in London, United Kingdom.
- June 1 until March 3, 2024 - Nicolas Party and Rosalba Carriera at the Frick Madison in New York City.
- June 9 until October 8 - Pierre Bonnard: Designed by India Mahdavi at the National Gallery of Victoria in Melbourne.
- June 11 until October 9 - Canova: Sketching in Clay at the National Gallery of Art in Washington DC.
- July 15 until January 14 2024 - Gladiators: A Day At The Roman Games at Colchester Castle.
- September 10 until January 13, 2024 - Ed Ruscha / Now Then at MoMA in New York City.
- September 12 until October 21 - Tetsuya Ishida: My Anxious Self (curated by Cecilia Alemani) at Gagosian Gallery in New York City.
- September 23 Until February 3, 2024 - Moki Cherry: Journey Eternal at the Moderna Museet in Malmö, Sweden.
- October 8 until February 17, 2024 - Picasso in Fontainbleu at MoMA in New York City.
- October 12 until March 3, 2024 - Judy Chicago: Herstory at the New Museum in New York City.
- October 13 until January 21, 2024 - Vertigo of Color: Matisse, Derain, and the Origins of Fauvism at the Metropolitan Museum of Art in New York City.
- October 18 until February 4, 2024 - Mark Rothko at the Louis Vuitton Foundation in Paris.
- October 20 until March 3 2024 - Mattia Preti. Discovering the baroque secrets of Malta at Podchorążówka Museum, Łazienki Park in Warsaw.
- October 22 until January 21, 2024 - Marie Laurencin: Sapphic Parts at the Barnes Foundation in Philadelphia, Pennsylvania.
- November 4 until January 13, 2024 - Tracey Emin: Lover's Grave at White Cube in New York City.
- November 5 until March 31 2024 - Bonnard’s Worlds at Kimbell Art Museum in Fort Worth, Texas
- November 18 until February 11 2024 - Botticelli Drawings (curated by Furio Rinaldi) at De Young Museum/Legion of Honor in San Francisco.
- November 17 until January 31, 2024 - Marta Minujin: Ariel! Ariel! Ariel! at the Jewish Museum in New York City.
- November 18 until May 19 2024 - Ramses & the Gold of the Pharaohs at the Australian Museum in Sydney.

== Works ==
- Refik Anadol - Unsupervised created for and installed at MoMA in New York City
- Banksy - Valentine's day mascara in Margate, Kent, England
- Janet Echelman - Current in Columbus, Ohio
- Urs Fischer - Divine Interventions
- Lucinda "La Morena" Hinojos - Super Bowl LVII Mural in Phoenix, Arizona
- Alexander Klingspor - N.Y.C. Legend
- Marta Minujin - Sculpture of Dreams commissioned for and installed in Times Square in Manhattan, New York City
- Shazia Sikander
  - Now
  - Witness
- Hiroshi Sugimoto - Point of Infinity, San Francisco
- Hank Willis Thomas - The Embrace installed on Boston Common in Boston, Massachusetts
- Jordan Wolfson - Body Sculpture (completed)
- Jonathan Yeo - His Majesty King Charles III (completed)

== Awards ==
- Turner Prize: Jesse Darling.

== Films ==
- Bonnard, Pierre and Marthe
- Lee
- Nam June Paik: Moon Is the Oldest TV
- Problemista
- Taking Venice

== Deaths ==
=== January ===
- January 2 - Marilyn Stafford, 97, American photographer
- January 3
  - Karim Bennani, 87, Moroccan painter
  - Zhou Lingzhao, 103, Chinese painter
  - Lyuben Zidarov, 97, Bulgarian illustrator and painter
- January 5 - Michael Snow, 94, Canadian artist
- January 9 - George S. Zimbel, 93, American-Canadian photographer
- January 10 - Hans Belting, 87, German art historian
- January 17 - Nicola Zamboni, 79, Italian sculptor
- January 27 - Alfred Leslie, 95, American painter and filmmaker

=== February ===
- February 13 - Jesse Treviño, 76, Mexican-American painter
- February 14 - Anthony Green, 83, British painter
- February 17 - Ángela Gurría, 93, Mexican sculptor
- February 26 - Ans Westra, 86, Dutch-born New Zealand photographer (Washday at the Pa)

=== March ===
- March 2 - Mary Bauermeister, 87, German visual artist and musician
- March 3
  - Camille Souter, 93, British-born Irish artist (death announced on this date)
  - Lou Stovall, 86, American visual artist
  - Rafael Viñoly, 78, Uruguayan architect (The Cleveland Museum of Art)
- March 5 - Piero Gilardi, 80, Italian sculptor
- March 7 - Ian Falconer, 63, American illustrator (The New Yorker)
- March 11 - Bill Tidy, 89, British cartoonist
- March 12 - Phyllida Barlow, 78, British visual artist
- March 18 - Francisco Rodón, 88, Puerto Rican painter
- March 21 - Shamim Sikder, 70, Bangladeshi sculptor (Shoparjito Shadhinota)
- March 23 - James Harithas, 90, American museum curator
- March 27 - Emily Fisher Landau, 102, American art collector and philanthropist
- March 29
  - Vivan Sundaram, 79, Indian artist
  - Myriam Ullens, 70, German born Belgian art patron

=== April ===
- April 3 - Neal Boenzi, 97, American photographer
- April 4 - Ted Bonin, 65, American art gallerist (death announced on this date)
- April 8 - Deborah Brown, 95, Northern Irish sculptor
- April 10 - Al Jaffee, 102, American cartoonist (Mad, Trump, Humbug)
- April 11
  - John Olsen, 95, Australian artist
  - Maya Wildevuur, 78, Dutch painter
- April 13 - Eberhard W. Kornfeld, 99, Swiss auctioneer, author, and art dealer
- April 14 - Ed Koren, 87, American cartoonist (The New Yorker)
- April 20 - Harold Riley, 88, English painter
- April 22 - Ju Ming, 85, Taiwanese sculptor
- April 23 - Yvonne Jacquette, 88, American painter

=== May ===
- May 6 - Frank Kozik, 61, Spanish-born American graphic artist
- May 11 - Kenneth Anger, 96, American Experimental Filmmaker
- May 15 - Roy Lerner, 68, American painter
- May 16 - Dorothy Knowles, 96, Canadian painter
- May 17 - Jorrit Tornquist, 85, Austrian-Italian visual artist, color consultant, and theorist
- May 27 - Ilya Kabakov, 89, Russian–American conceptual artist
- May 30 - Hans-Peter Feldmann, 82, German visual artist

=== June ===
- June 6 - Françoise Gilot, 101, French painter
- June 18 - Graziano Origa, 70, Italian comic book artist
- June 22 - Cora Cohen, 79, American artist

=== July ===
- July 2 - Khosrow Hassanzadeh, 60, Iranian painter
- July 4 - Jan Sierhuis, 94, Dutch painter
- July 11
  - Fazil Najafov, 88, Azerbaijani sculptor
  - Ales Pushkin, 57, Belarusian painter, theatre director, and political prisoner
- July 21 - Tony Bennett, 96, American singer and painter
- July 24
  - Jesse Lott, 80, American visual artist (death announced on this date)
  - Oswaldo Viteri, 91, Ecuadorian painter
- July 25 - Giorgio Di Genova, 89, Italian art historian (History of Italian Art of the Twentieth Century)
- July 27 - Didier Lourenço, 55, Spanish painter
- July 30 - Konrad Klapheck, 88, German painter and graphic artist

=== August ===
- August 1 - David Le Batard, 50, American artist
- August 9 - Brice Marden, 84, American painter
- August 24 - Claude Picasso, 76, French photographer, cinematographer, and graphic designer
- August 26 - Mario Costa, 86, Italian philosopher, author (Arte Contemporanea ed Estetica del Flusso), and art theorist

=== September ===
- September 8 - Lisa Lyon, 70, American bodybuilder and fine art photography model (Robert Mapplethorpe)
- September 15 - Fernando Botero, 91, Colombian painter and sculptor
- September 20 - Erwin Olaf, 64, Dutch photographer

=== October ===
- October 14
  - Park Seo-bo, 91, South Korean painter
  - Gastón Ugalde, 79, Bolivian visual artist
- October 18 - Juanita McNeely, 89, American artist
- October 20 - Eduardo Arranz-Bravo, 82, Catalan Spanish painter
- October 22 - Ida Applebroog, 93, American multi-media artist
- October 25 - Robert Irwin, 95, American artist, Light and Space

=== November ===
- November 4 - Gord Smith, 86, Canadian sculptor
- November 13 - Joe Tilson, 96, British artist
- November 15 - Radcliffe Bailey, 54, American artist
- November 20 - Rob Krier, 85, Luxembourgish sculptor, architect, and urban designer
- November 25 - Larry Fink, 82, American photographer (death announced on this date)

=== December ===
- December 5 - Paul Dibble, 80, New Zealand sculptor
- December 7 - Vera Molnár, 99, Hungarian media artist
- December 10 - Graziella Magherini, 96, Italian psychiatrist dealing with art related psychosomatic disorders (Stendhal syndrome)
- December 16 - Richard Hunt, 88, American sculptor
- December 18 - Giovanni Anselmo, 89, Italian artist (Arte Povera)
- December 22 - Imroz, 97, Indian painter and printmaker
- December 23 - William Pope.L, 68, American performance and public intervention artist
- December 24 - Sherif Sonbol, 67, Egyptian photographer
- December 28 - Hardi, 72, Indonesian visual artist
- December 30 - Martha Diamond, 79, American painter
