= BBBP =

BBBP may refer to:

- Beti Bachao, Beti Padhao, a campaign of the Government of India to save and educate the girl child
- Bad Bitches Bang Pink, a mixtape by rapper Jacki-O
- Bronx Blue Bedroom Project, alternative art project by artist Blanka Amezkua
- Boom Blox Bash Party, a 2009 video game for the Wii
