= Blanka Amezkua =

Mexican contemporary artist

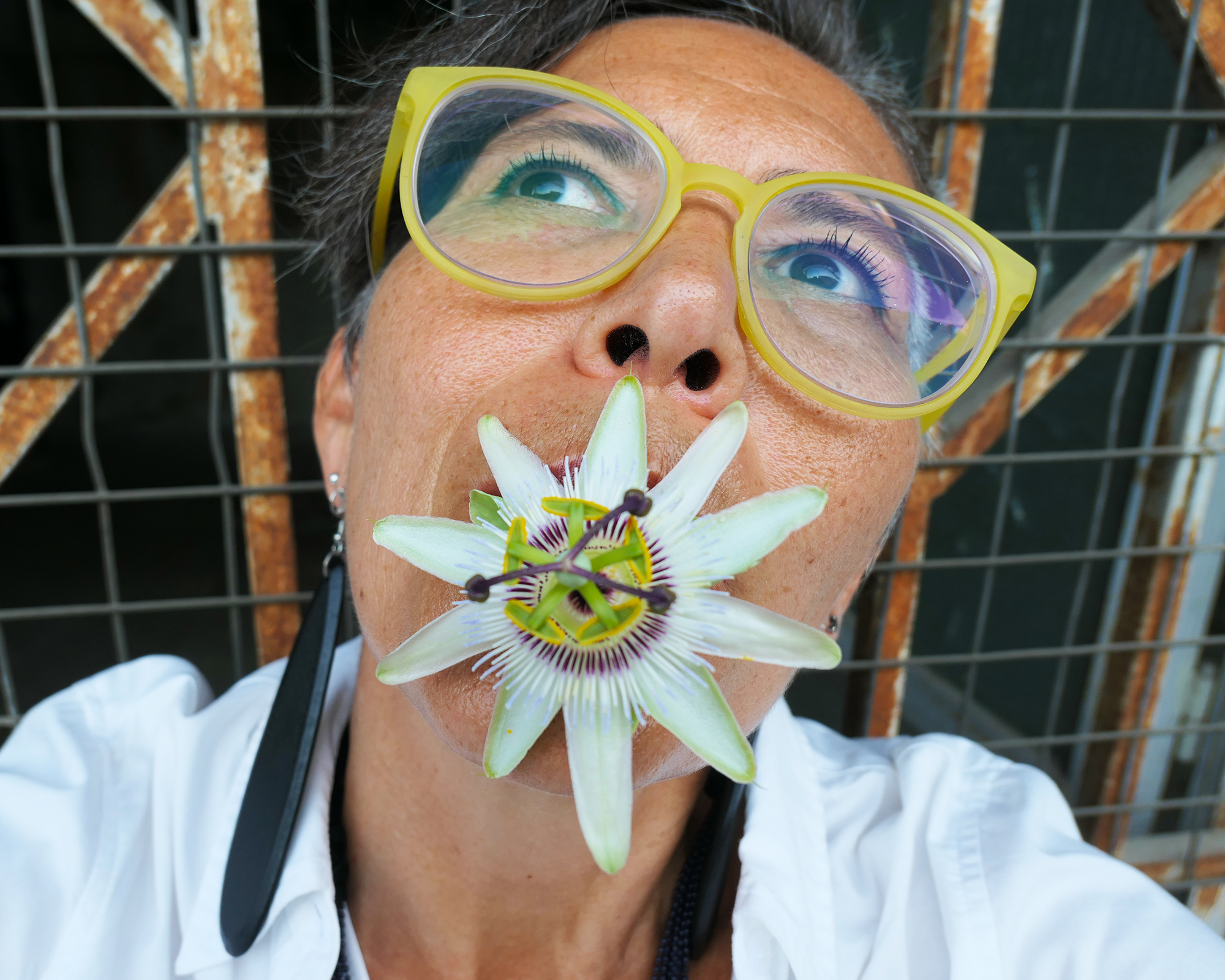

Blanka Amezkua (born 1971) is a Mexican-American Latino inter-disciplinary contemporary artist. Collaboration, radical pedagogy, and community building are central to her art making and projects. Formally trained as a painter, her creative practice is greatly influenced and informed by folk art and popular culture, from papel picado to comic books.

== Early life ==
Amezkua was born in Mexico City and raised in Los Angeles, California. She earned a B.A. from California State University at Fresno, and she attended the Scuola Libera del Nudo of the Accademia di Belle Arti of Florence, Italy, between 1997 and 1998 and is formally trained as a painter.

== Career ==
Amezkua is known for having initiated an artist-run space in her bedroom called the Bronx Blue Bedroom Project (BBBP) in 2008. In 2010, BBBP's two-year trajectory was included in the show "Alternative Histories" at Exit Art in New York City.

The space was also included in 2010, in the seminal book Alternative Histories - New York Art Spaces 1960 to 2010, MIT Press.

From 2010 to 2016, she lived between New York City and Athens, Greece and began a project titled "3///3 ...three walls on wednesdays...", an open invitation for artists from anywhere in the world to exhibit their work on three portable walls that she carried and placed throughout the city.

In 2012 she initiated 8 to 8: State of Creative Emergency an opportunity for artists in any field to craft an idea and present it in public space for twelve hours straight.

In the spring of 2014 she founded Fo Kia Nou 24/7, now FokiaNou Art Space. The space hosts exhibitions, workshops and projects inside an apartment in the center of Athens. Now, this artist-run space is under the direction of two artists, Mary Cox and Panagiotis Voulgaris, who took it over in the fall of 2016.

In 2016 Blanka initiated AAA3A - acronym for her actual address; it is an artist-run space in the South Bronx crafting living room occurrences, face-to-face exchanges, meals, dialogue, workshops, residencies and art in the former home of the Bronx Blue Bedroom Project (BBBP).

Mentions of her work and projects can be found in various notable national and international publications and sites, such as: The New York Times, TimeOut NY, The Bomb magazine, The Wall Street International, Art News, Artsy, Hyperallergic, and many others.

=== The Future is LATINX, Eastern Connecticut State University Art Gallery (2020-21) ===
Amezkua's work was exhibited in the traveling group show The Future is LATINX, which debuted at Eastern Connecticut State University's Art Gallery. Exhibition Coordinator Yulia Tikhonova noted that the exhibition was intended to "draw attention to the rich cultural production of our Latino population as we continue on our path to becoming a 'minority white' nation [...] This community will dramatically change our politics, media, education, and cultural landscape. This is the future our exhibition anticipates." The Future is LATINX was on view at the Eastern Connecticut State University Art Gallery in Windham, Connecticut from October 8 - December 2, 2020. The exhibition traveled to Clark University's Schiltkamp Gallery under the title Latin + American from March 15 – May 9, 2021 and Three Rivers Community College in Norwich, Connecticut from August 30 – October 1, 2021. Amezkua showed her work alongside artists Tanya Aguiñiga, Alicia Grullón, Glendalys Medina, Natalia Nakazawa, Esteban Ramón Pérez, Lina Puerta, Shellyne Rodriguez, Felipe Baeza, Lionel Cruet, David Antonio Cruz, Ramiro Gomez, Rafael Lozano-Hemmer, Dante Migone-Ojeda, and Vick Quezada. Amezkua exhibited the piece Untitled (Silhouette with Skirt) in The Future is LATINX.

=== Awards ===
- 2009 Department of Cultural Affairs Greater New York Arts Development Fund 2009 : (Bronx Blue Bedroom Project)
- 2008 The Bronx Museum of the Arts: AIM 28 (Artist in the Marketplace)
- 2008 Bronx Council On The Arts: BRIO

=== Residencies ===
2022 Wave Hill Winter Workspace; Bronx, NY; January – February

2021 Artist Research Fellowship of the Hispanic Society Museum & Library; New York, NY

2021 Bridging the Divide - an Artbridge Residency at Mitchel Houses; Bronx, NY

2020 Governors Island Residency with Bronx Art Space; New York, NY; September - October

2020 ARC-Athens Virtual Resident; June

2019 AIM - The Block Gallery; Tribeca, NY; January - June

2013 artAmari : Amari, Crete, Greece; May 1 - 20
