= Current (sculpture) =

2023 sculpture by Janet Echelman in Columbus, Ohio, U.S.

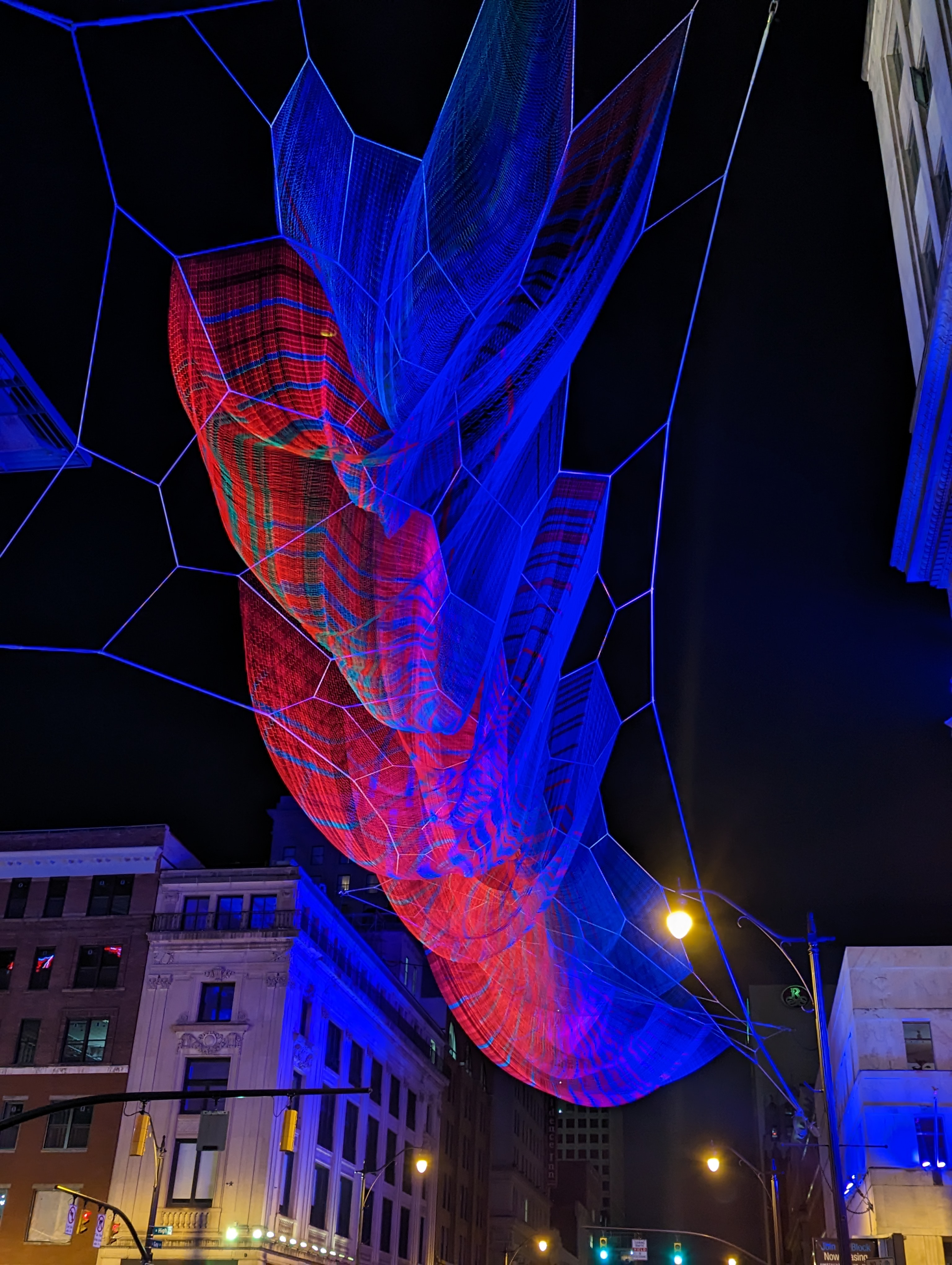
- Current in 2023
- Artist: Janet Echelman
- Medium: Soft fiber sculpture
- Location: High and Gay streets, Columbus, Ohio, U.S.; 39°57′49″N 83°0′3″W
- Owner: Columbus Museum of Art

Current is a soft fiber sculpture by Janet Echelman, installed in Columbus, Ohio, United States. The work is suspended over High and Gay streets in Downtown Columbus. The sculpture was installed in May 2023. It is intended to represent the changing urban fabric of the city, and is situated around a large redevelopment by Jeff Edwards, who paid for the sculpture.

== Design ==
Current is made up of fibers that are braided with nylon and Ultra-high molecular weight polyethylene. The sculpture reaches 229 feet at its longest and weighs a total of 714 pounds.

== See also ==
- 2023 in art
