= Point of Infinity =

2023 sculpture by Hiroshi Sugimoto in San Francisco, California, U.S.

- Point of Infinity with the Bay Bridge and San Francisco visible in the distance.
- Artist: Hiroshi Sugimoto
- Year: 2023
- Location: San Francisco, California, U.S.
- 37°48′38″N 122°22′8″W

Point of Infinity is a 69-foot-tall stainless steel sculpture by Japanese artist Hiroshi Sugimoto, installed on a Yerba Buena Island hilltop in San Francisco, California. The artwork also acts as a sundial. Installed in 2023, it is the first permanent sculpture commissioned for the Treasure Island Arts Program, and the artist's first major installation in the United States.

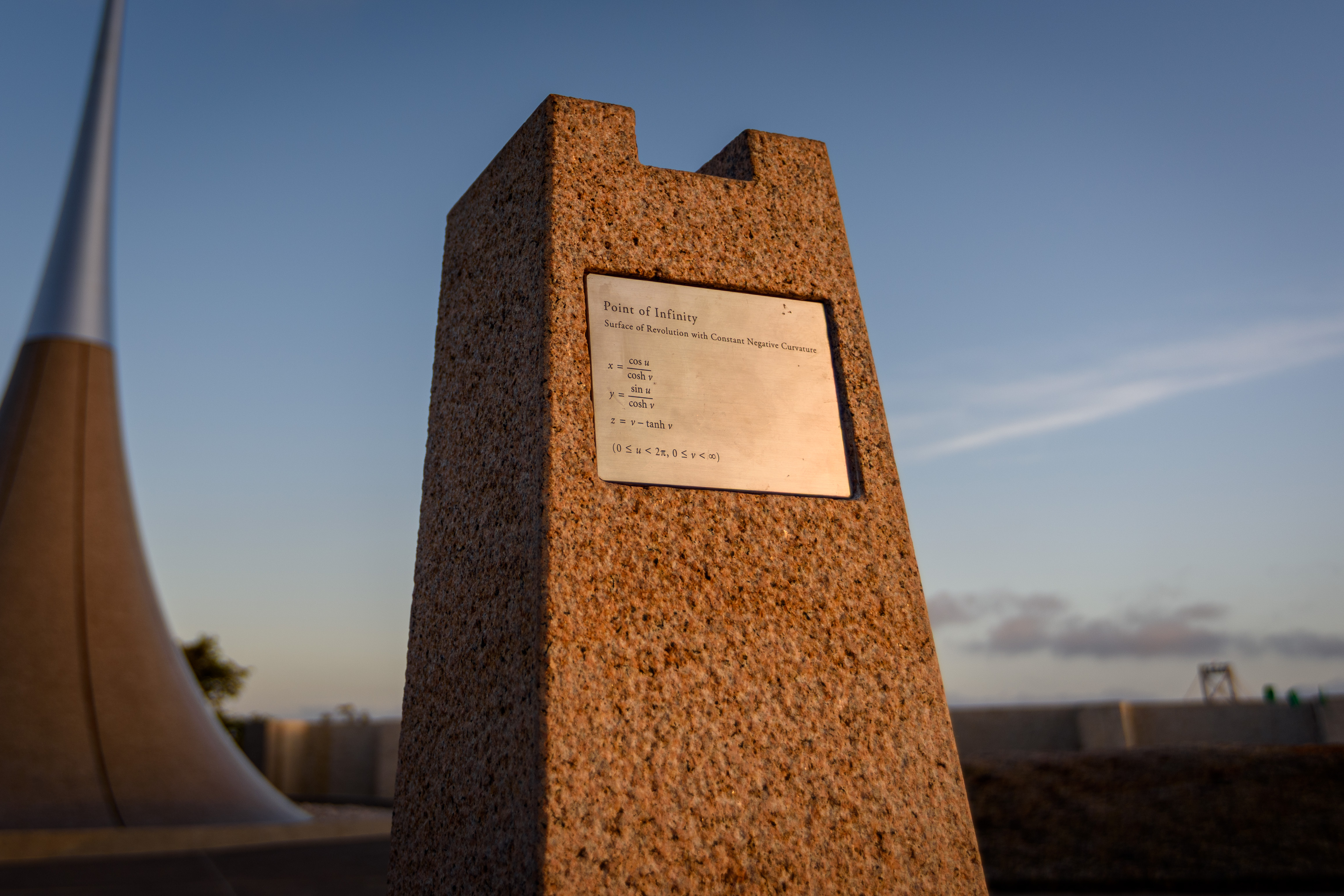
Informational plaque with the mathematical formula defining the sculpture's shape

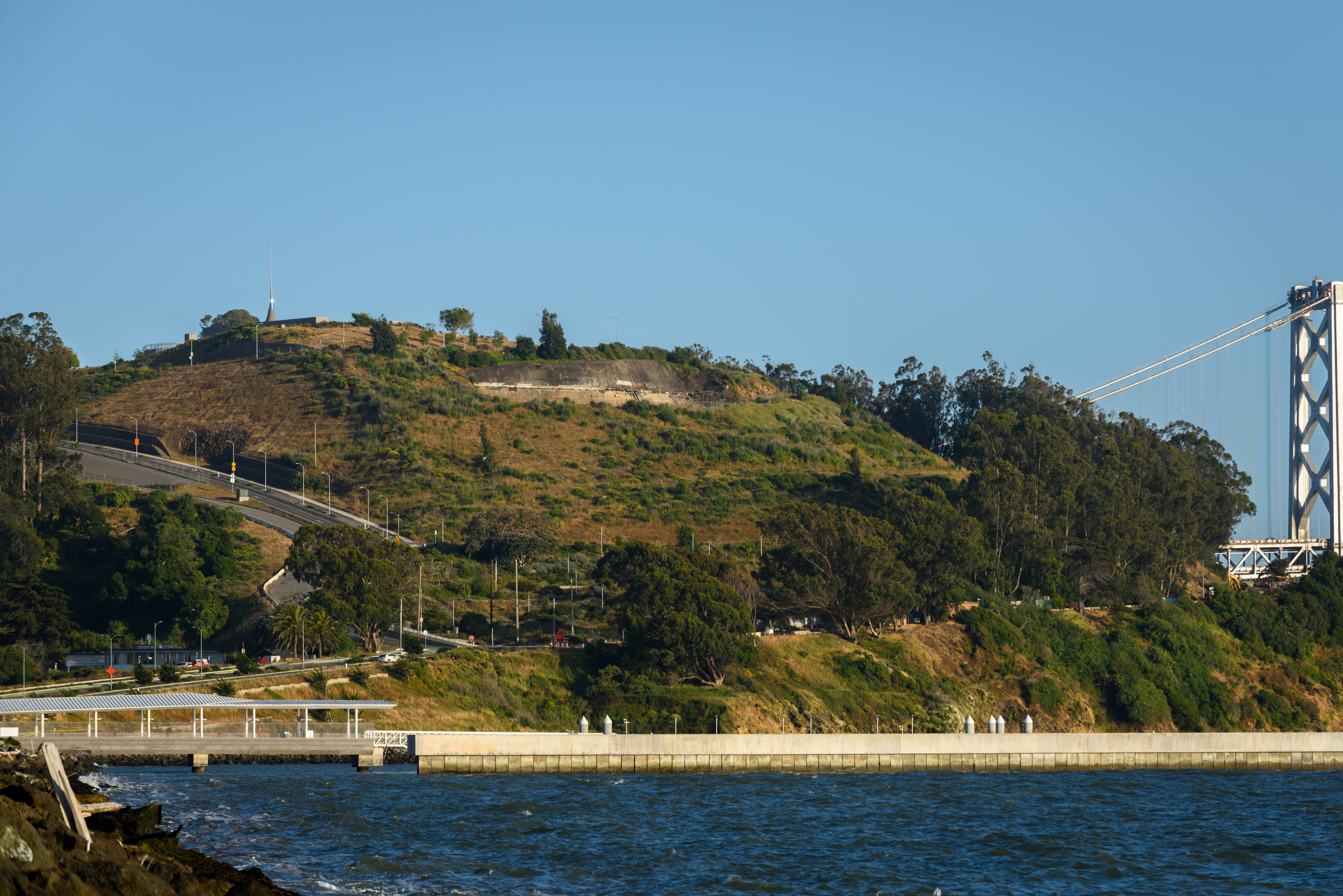
Yerba Buena Island, with Point of Infinity visible at the top left of the island.

== See also ==
- 2023 in art
- List of public art in San Francisco
