= High and Gay Streets Historic District =

Historic district in Ohio, United States

- U.S. National Register of Historic Places
- U.S. Historic district
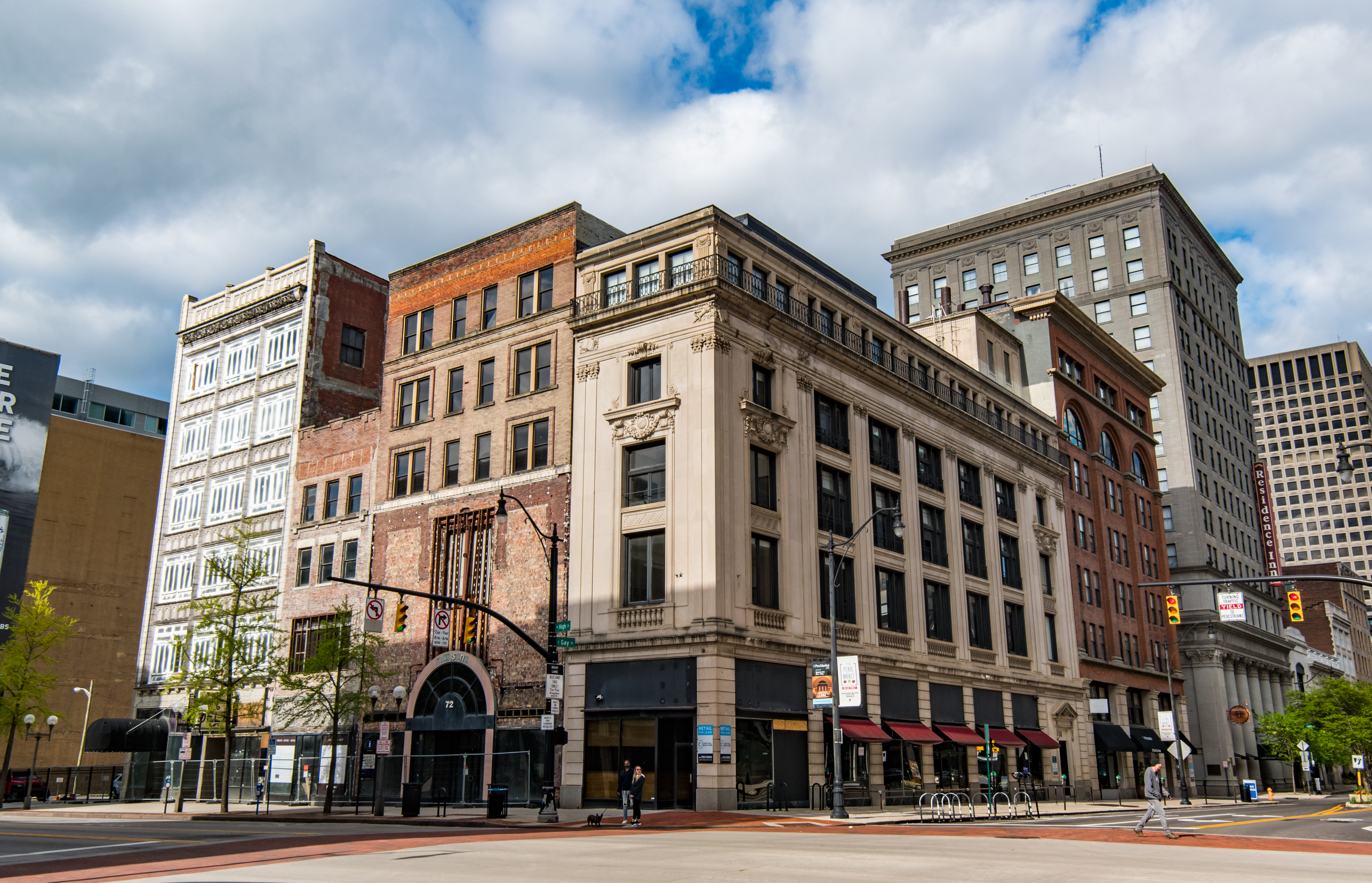
- Northeast block of the district
- Interactive map highlighting the district's boundaries
- Location: Downtown Columbus, Ohio
- Coordinates: 39.96361°N 83.00091°W
- Area: 4 acres (1.6 ha)
- NRHP reference No.: 14000041
- Added to NRHP: March 4, 2014

The High and Gay Streets Historic District is a historic district in Downtown Columbus, Ohio. The site was listed on the National Register of Historic Places in 2014.

The district includes 18 buildings, including three that are non-contributing, and one contributing building that has since been demolished. The buildings span three of four blocks surrounding the intersection of High and Gay Streets; the northwest block was predominantly used for parking at the time, with only one building, the Rankin Building (separately listed on the NRHP), on that block. Its boundaries are Wall St. on the west, Elm Aly. on the north, Lynn St. on the east, and Pearl St. on the south.

The 15 contributing buildings range from two to ten stories in height. Their architecture styles include Italianate, Classical Revival, early 20th century commercial, mid-century modern, vernacular, and Art Moderne. The buildings are considered eligible for their quality of design and representation of noted Columbus architects. In addition, their association with the 19th and 20th century development of the city's High Street business corridor adds to the district's qualification.

A block east reaching to Third Street was determined eligible for the National Register in 1990, as the East Gay Street Commercial Historic District. Several of the High and Gay contributing buildings were a part of the earlier nomination as well. The 1990 nomination failed due to opposition from property owners. Several were approached again for the High and Gay listing, but again did not support listing.

The row of buildings at 72-84 North High are in the process of renovation, and were awarded historic preservation tax credits. The buildings were listed on Columbus Landmarks' 2019 List of Endangered Properties as the tax credits expired and the buildings continue to deteriorate.

== Gallery ==
Southwest block

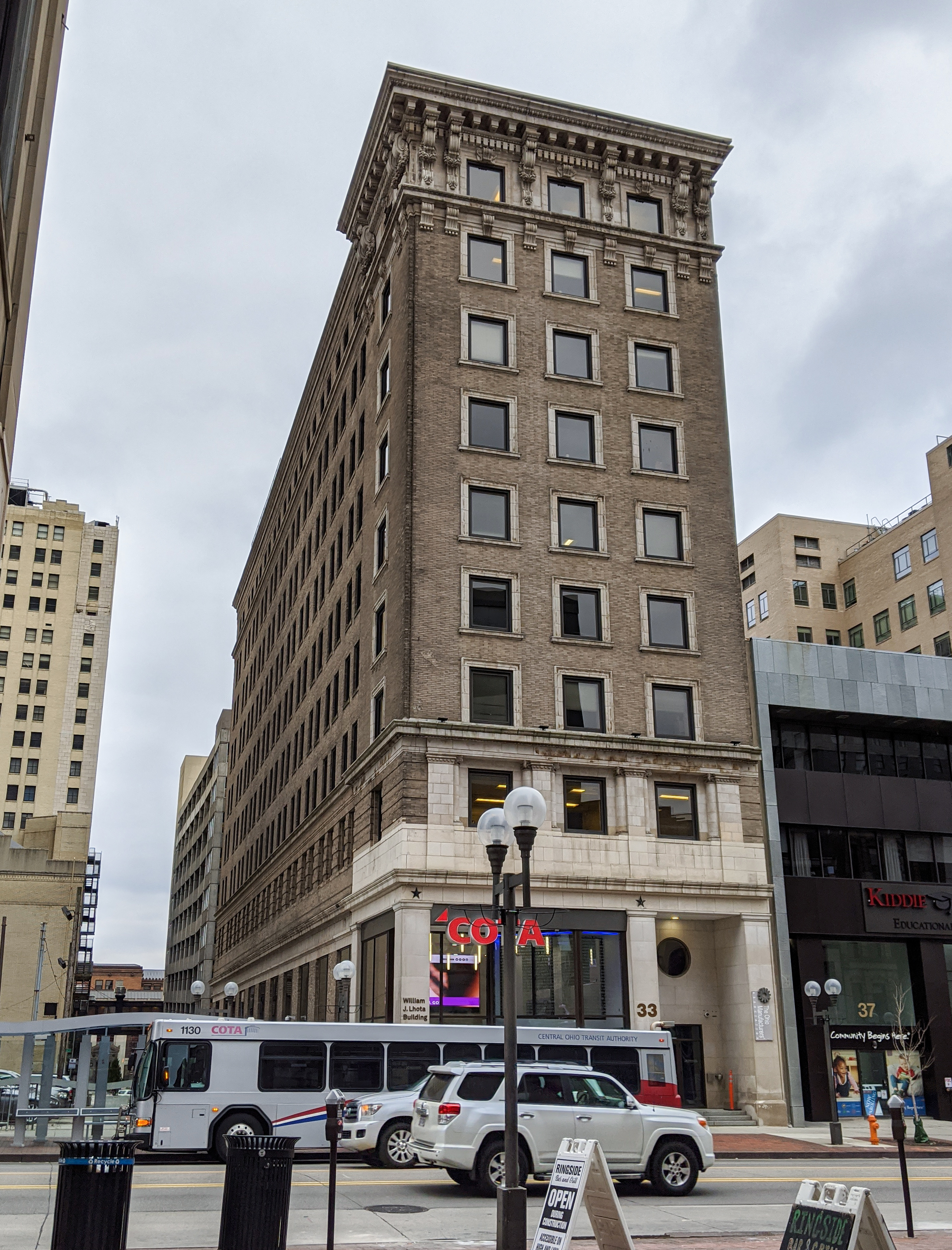
33 North High (William J. Lhota Building)

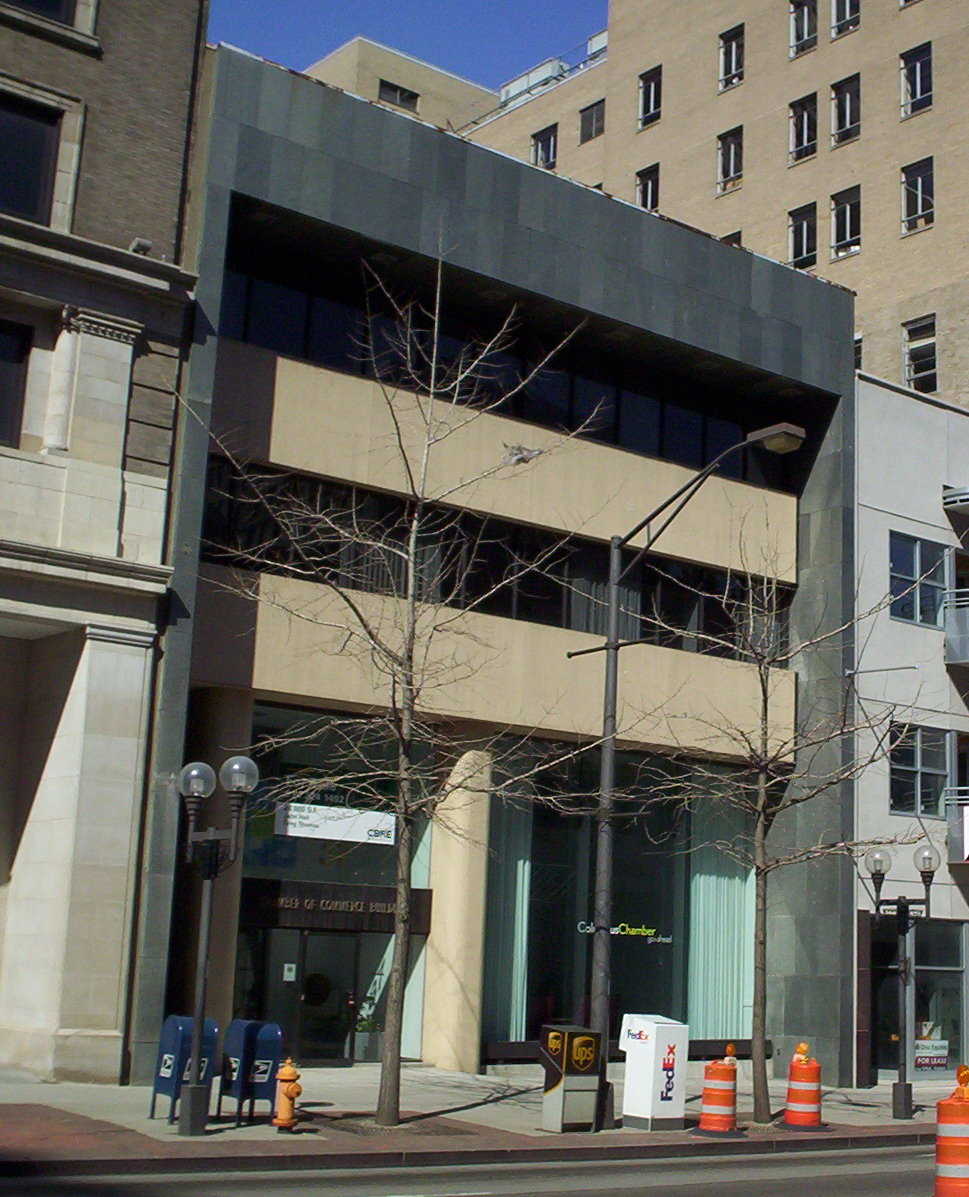
37-41 North High (non-contributing)

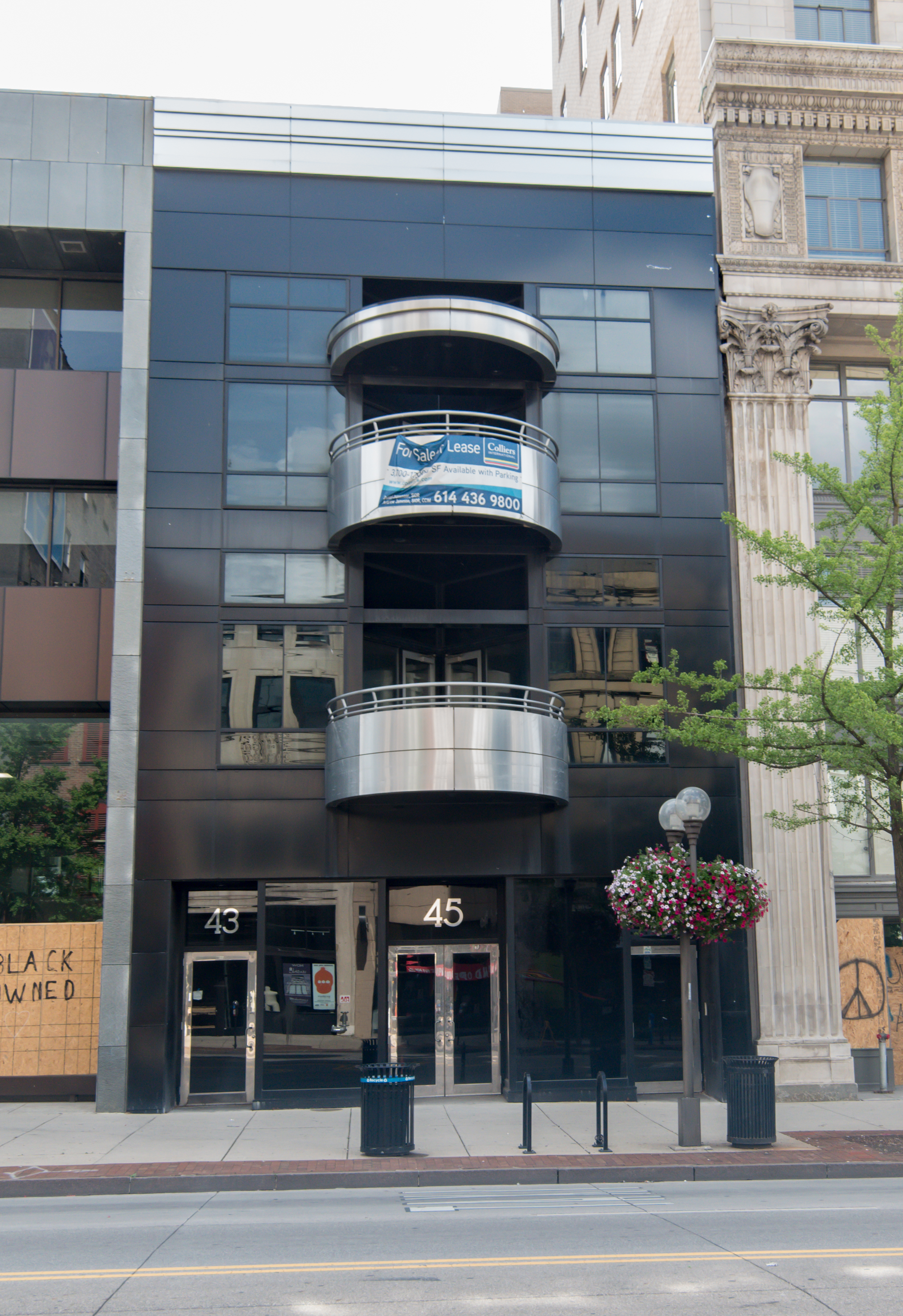
43 North High (non-contributing)

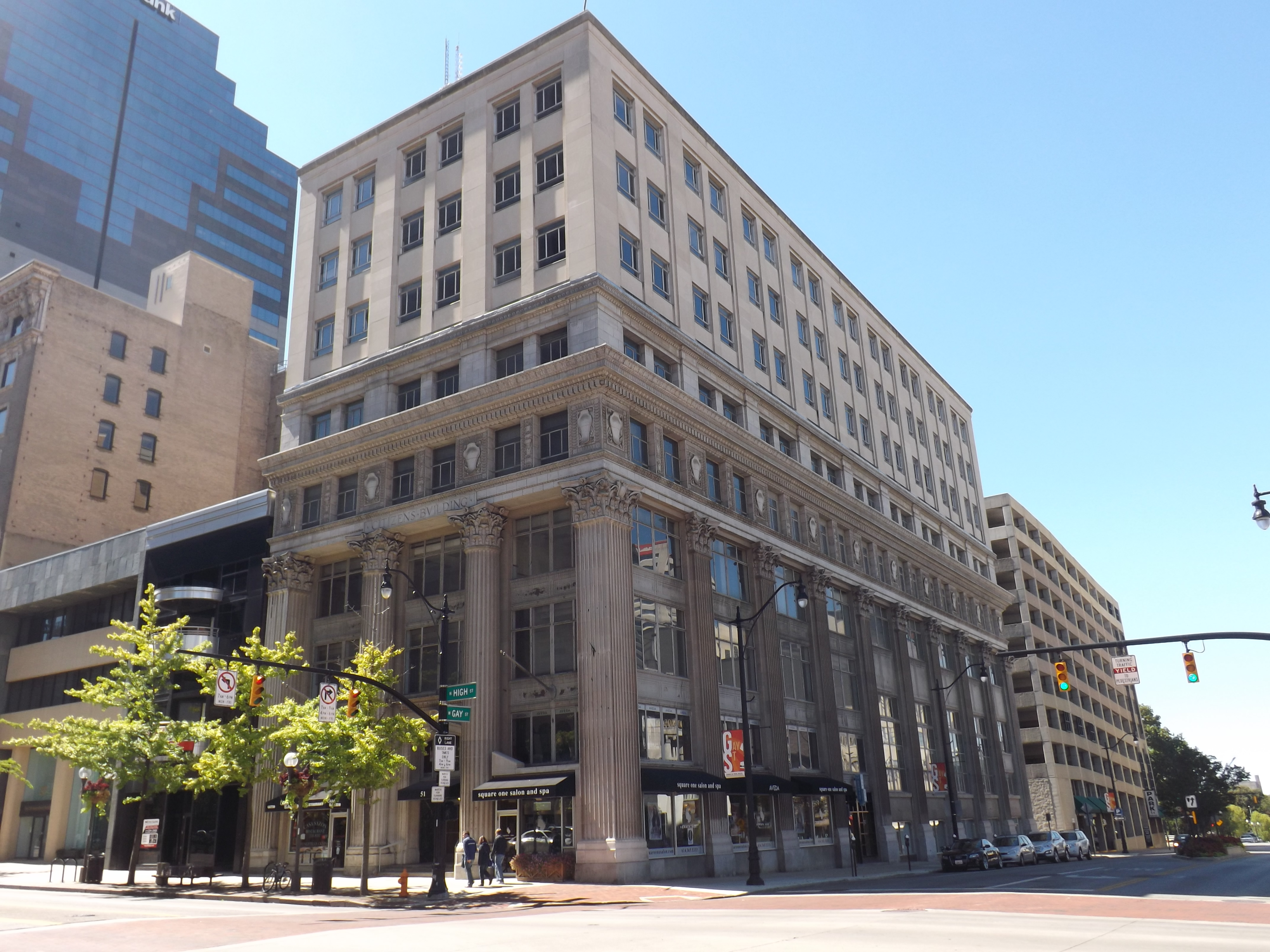
49-53 North High (the Citizens Building)

Southeast block

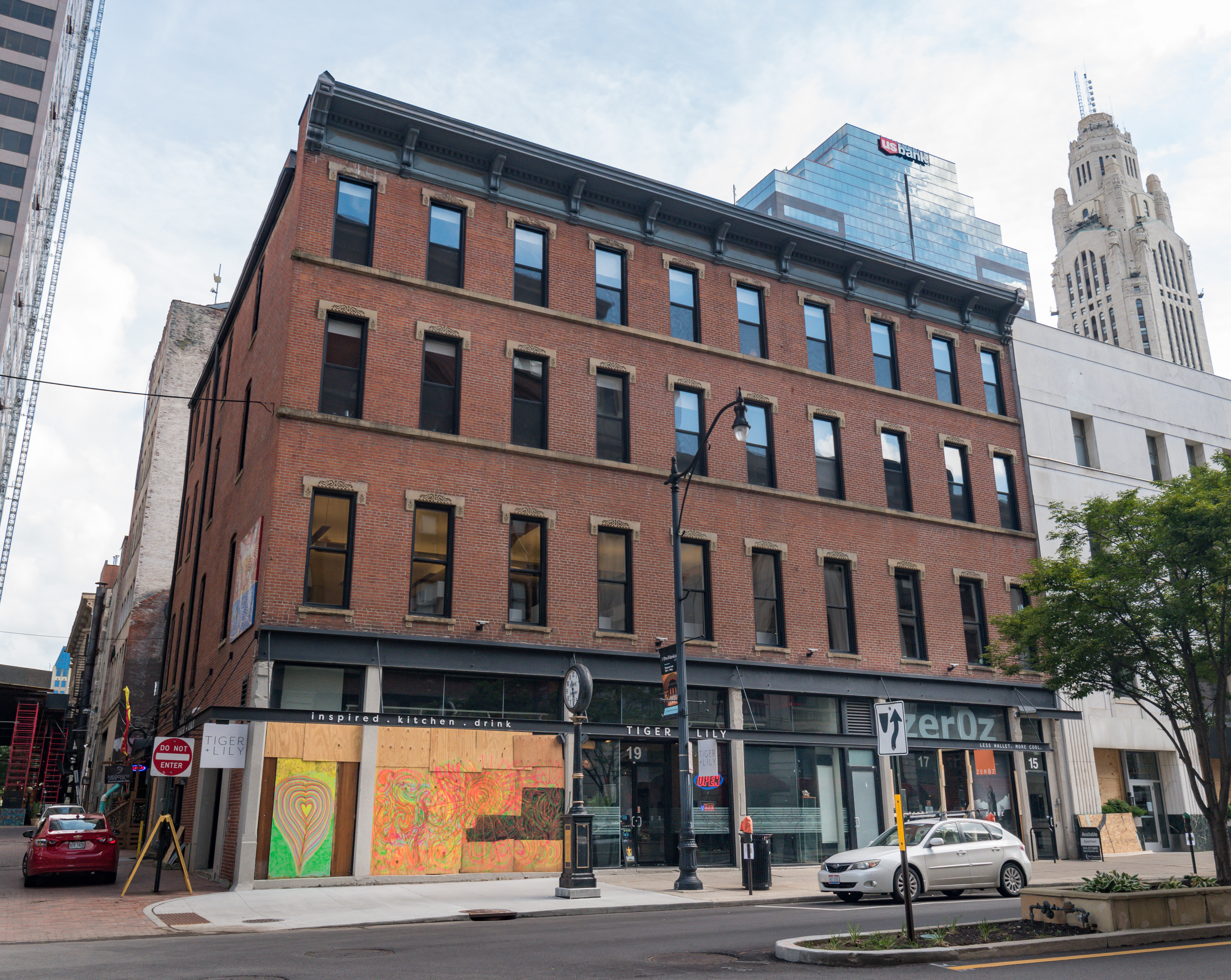
15-19 East Gay

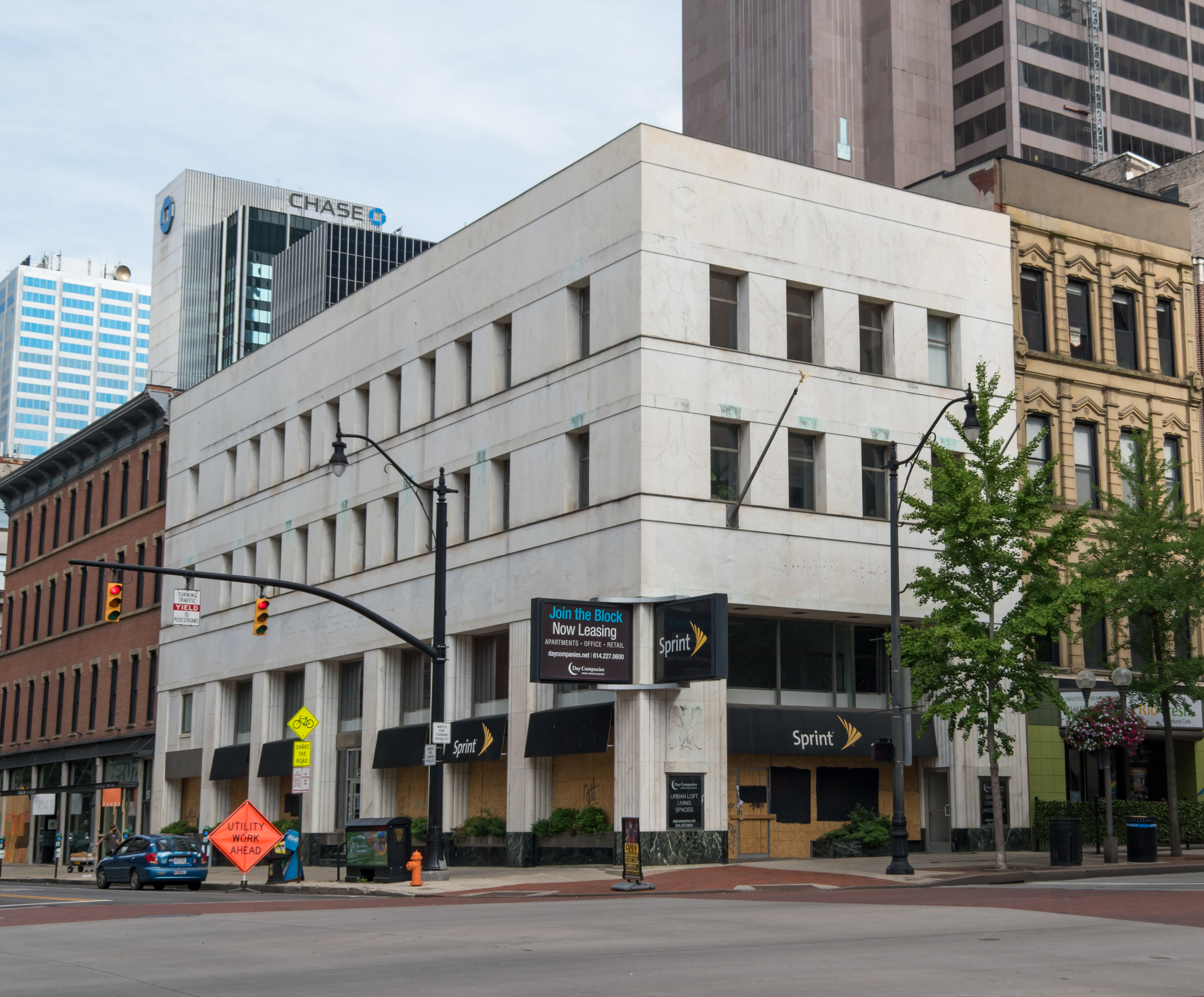
56 North High

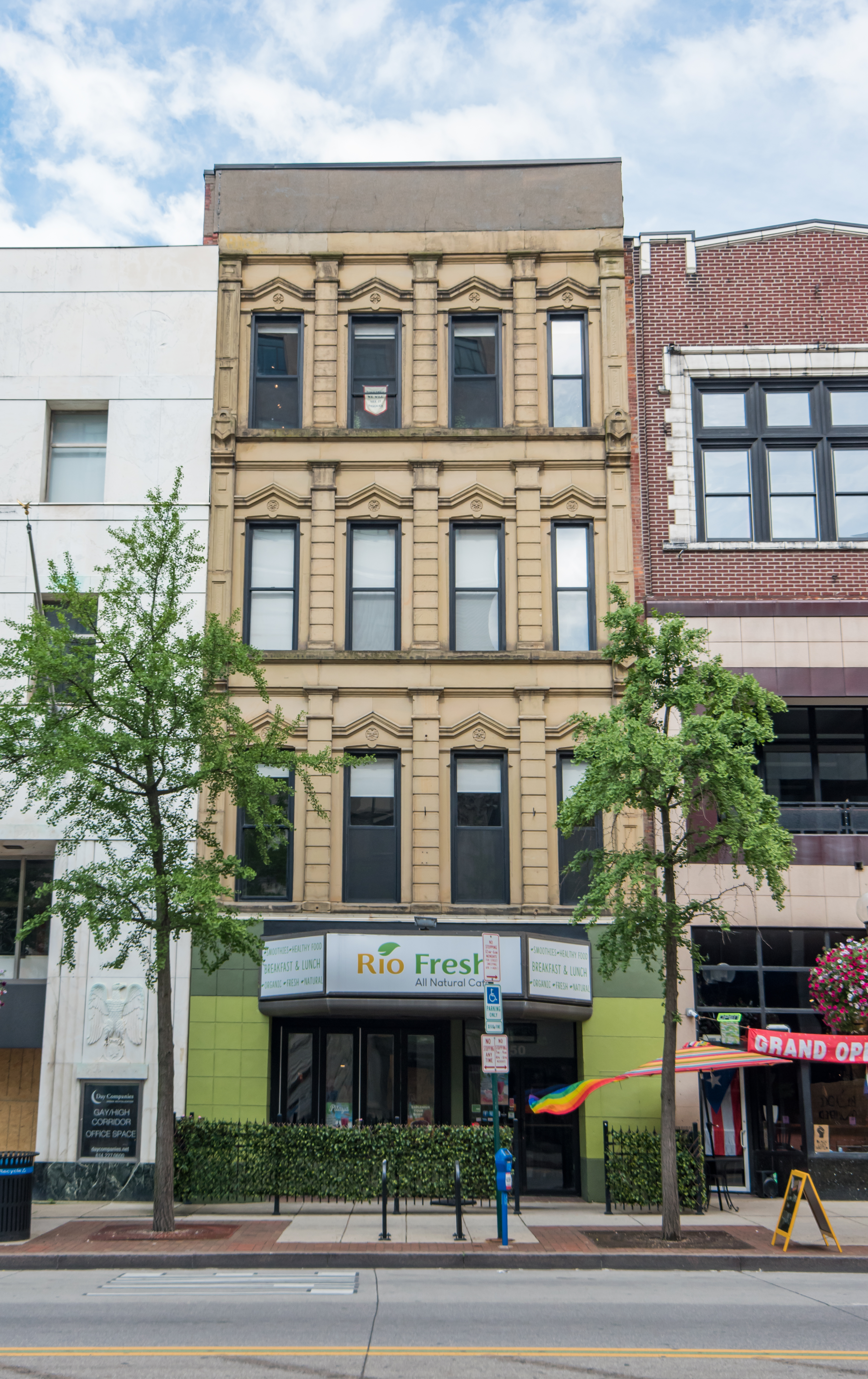
50-52 North High

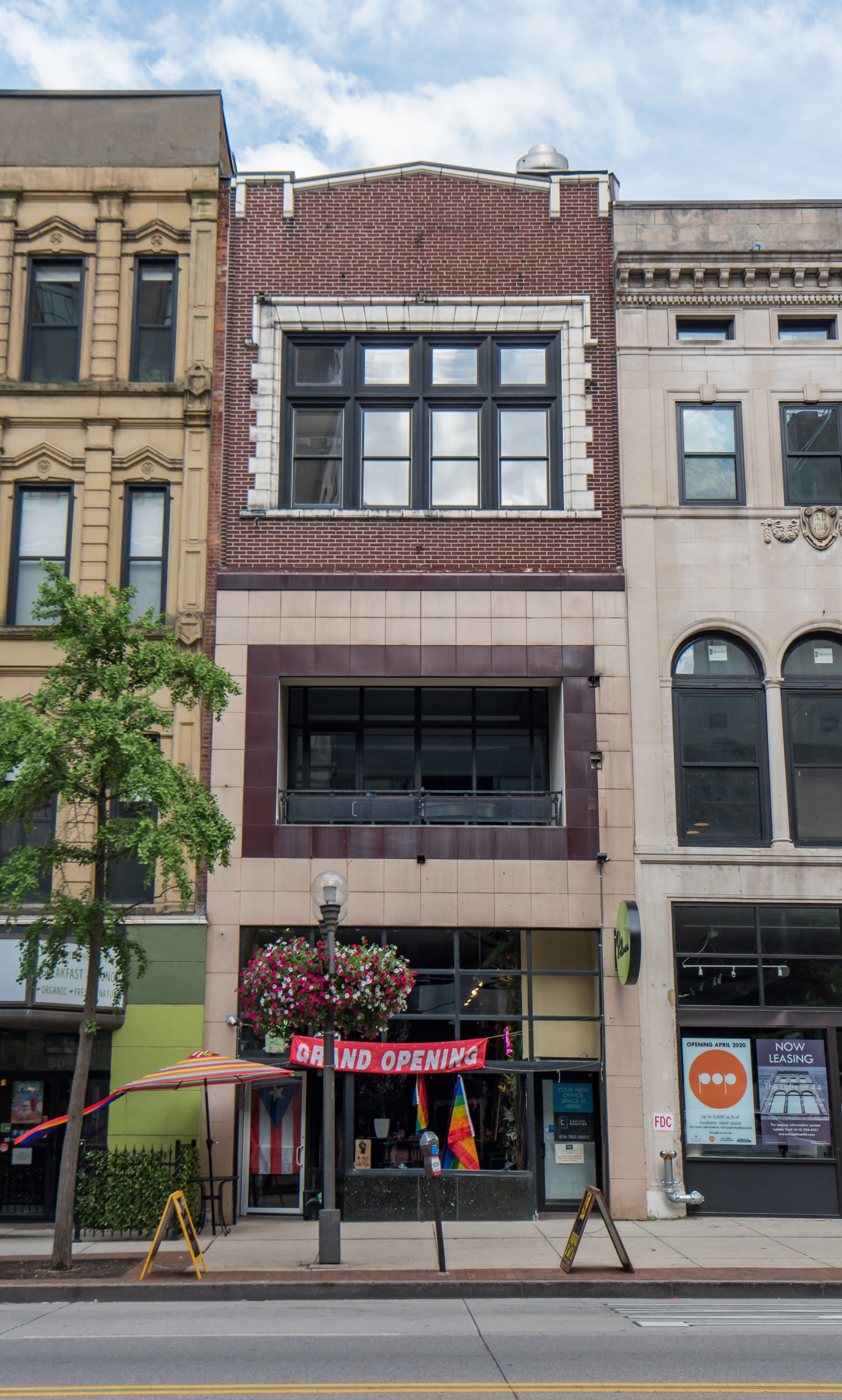
46-48 North High

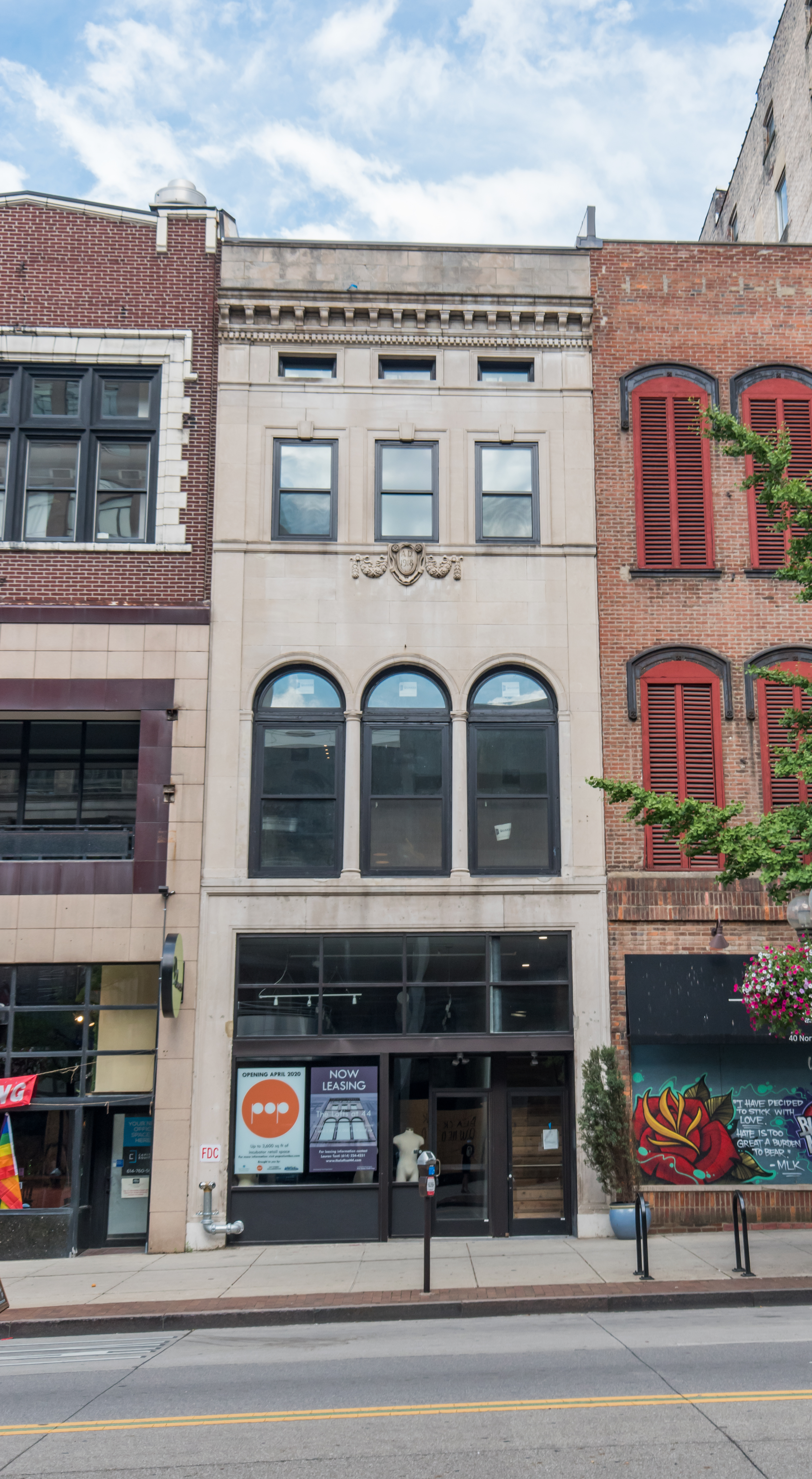
44 North High

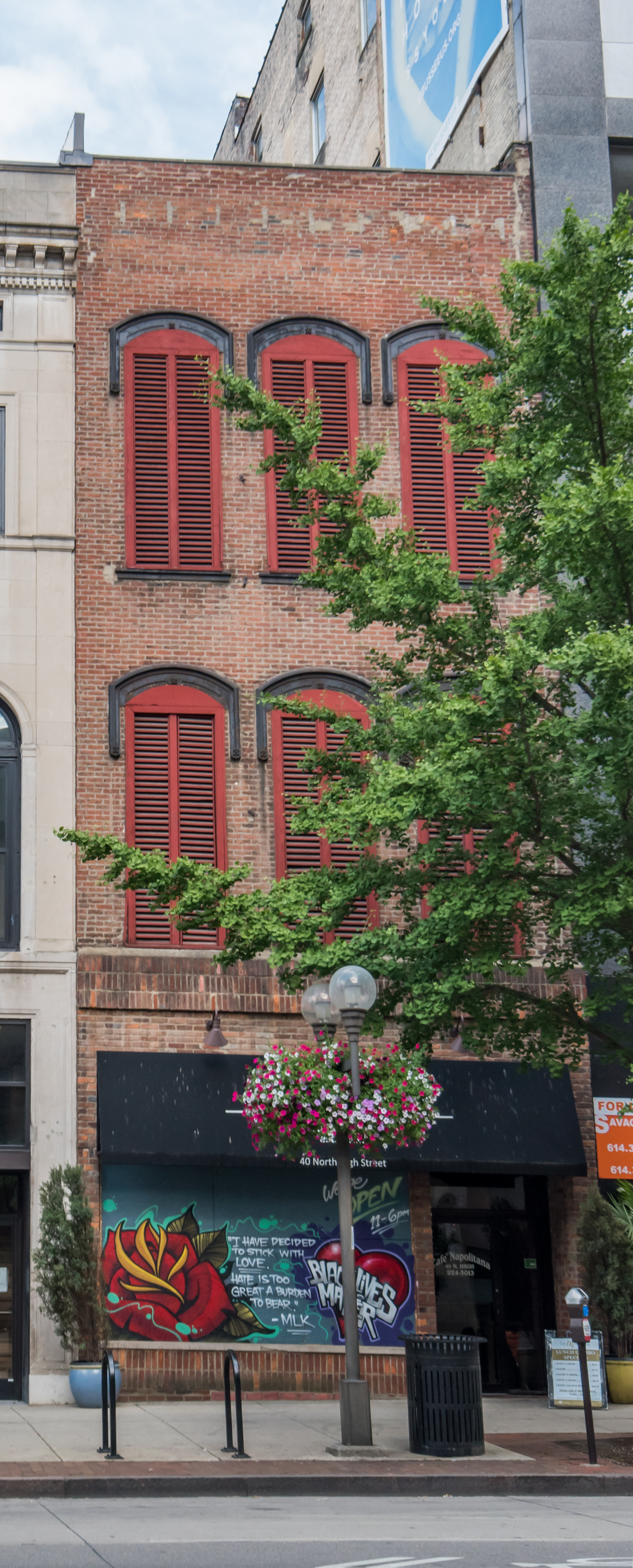
40 North High

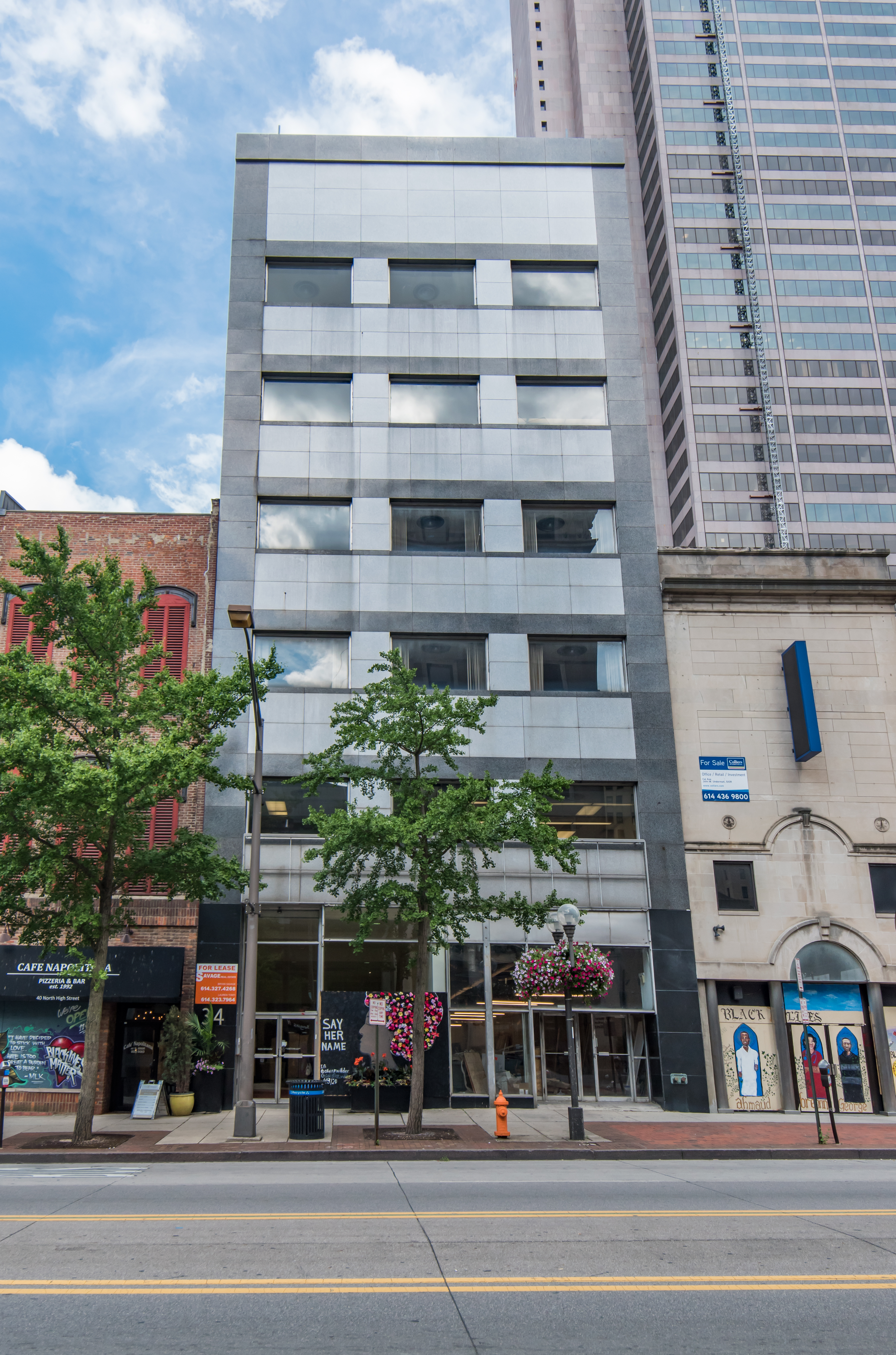
32-34 North High

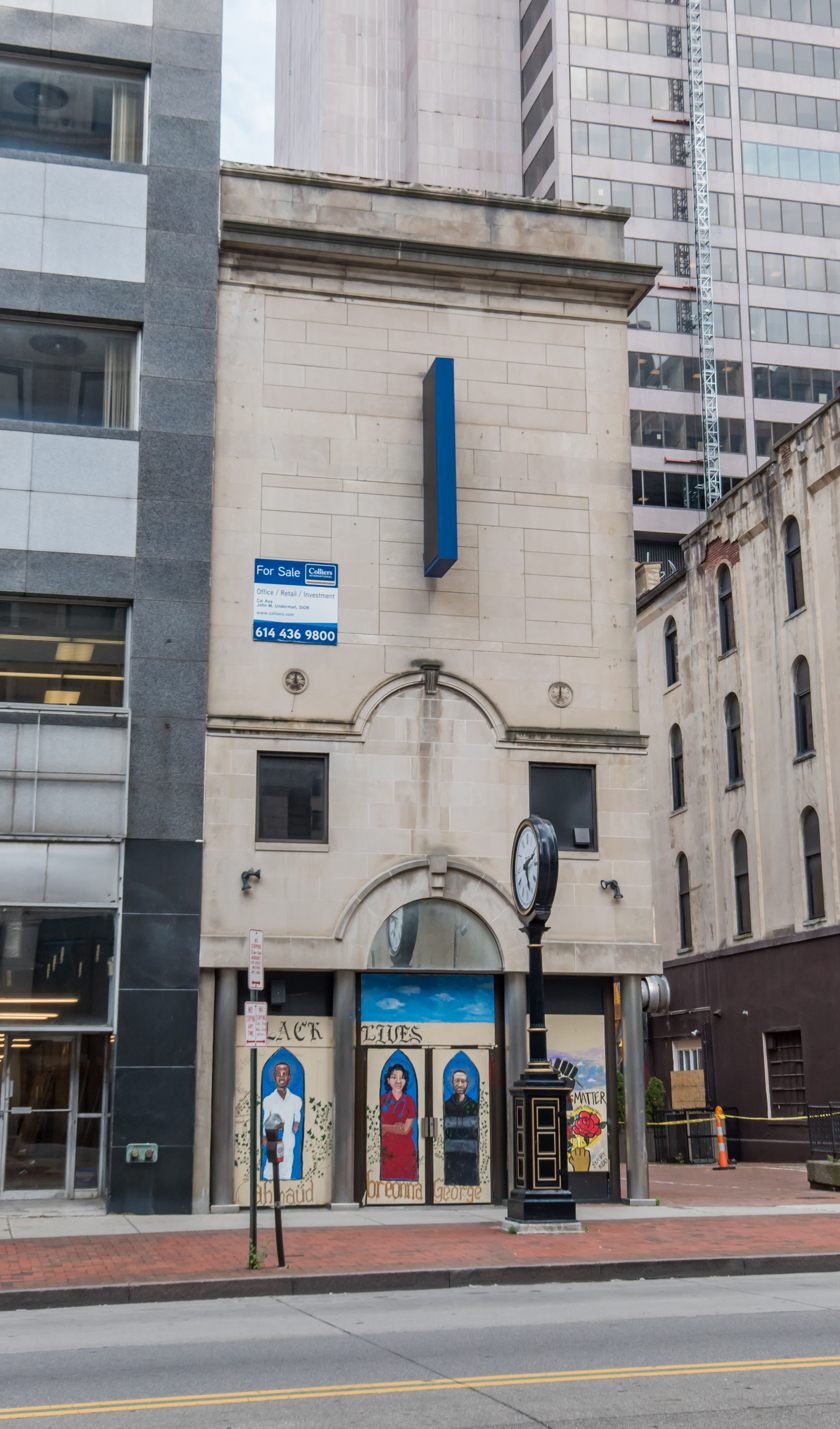
30 North High

Northeast block

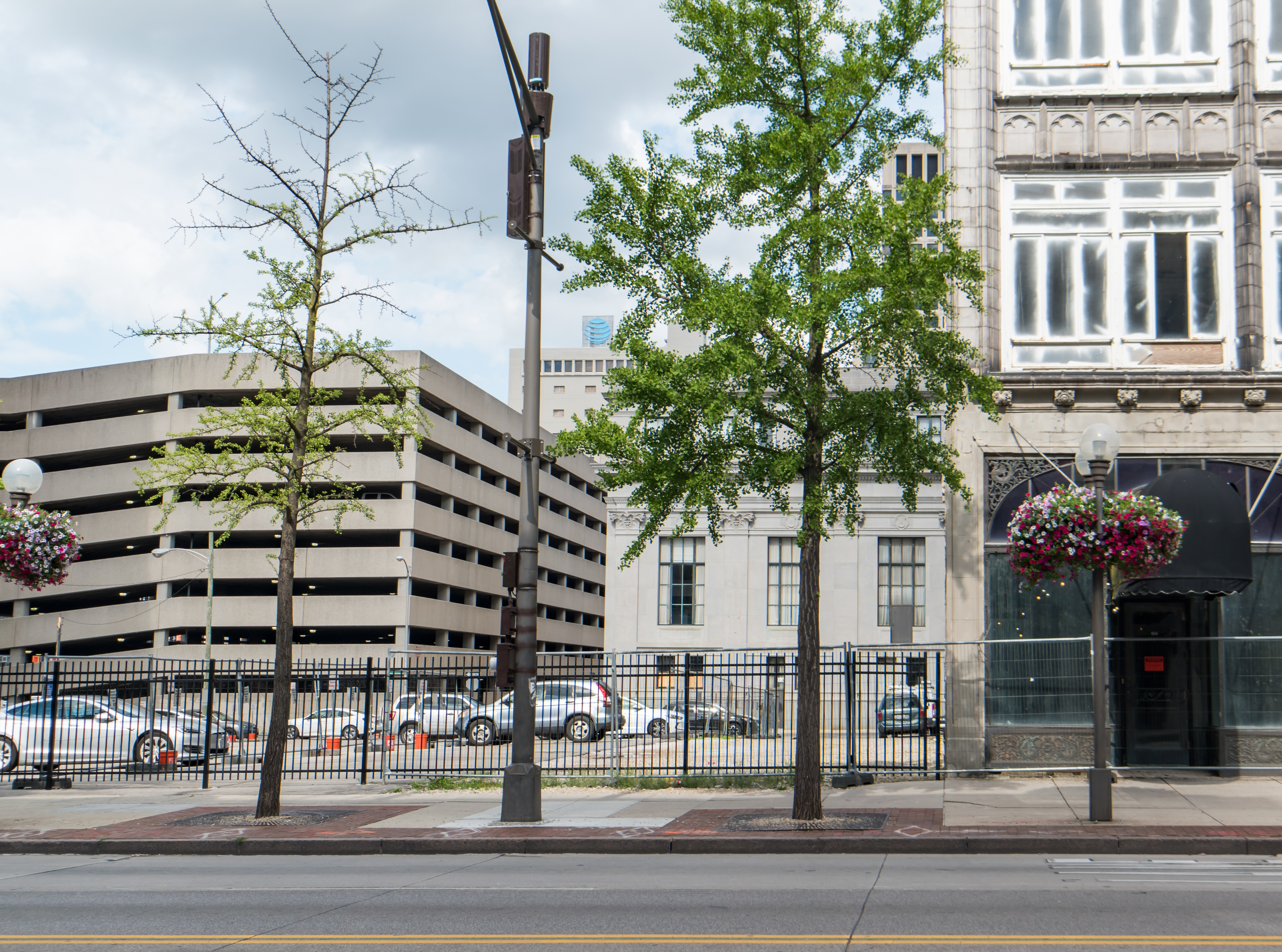
90 North High (demolished)

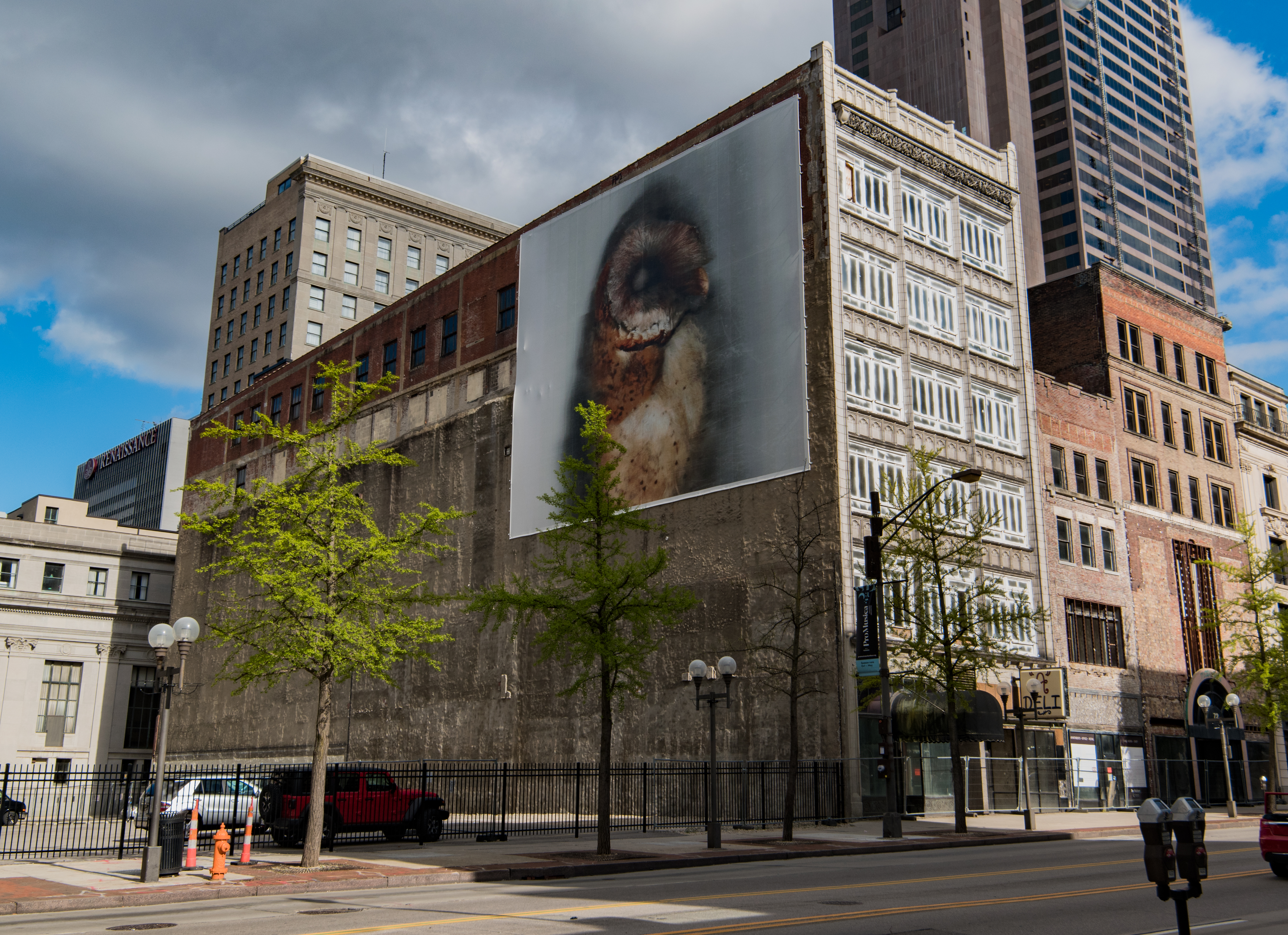
80-84 North High (the White–Haines Building)

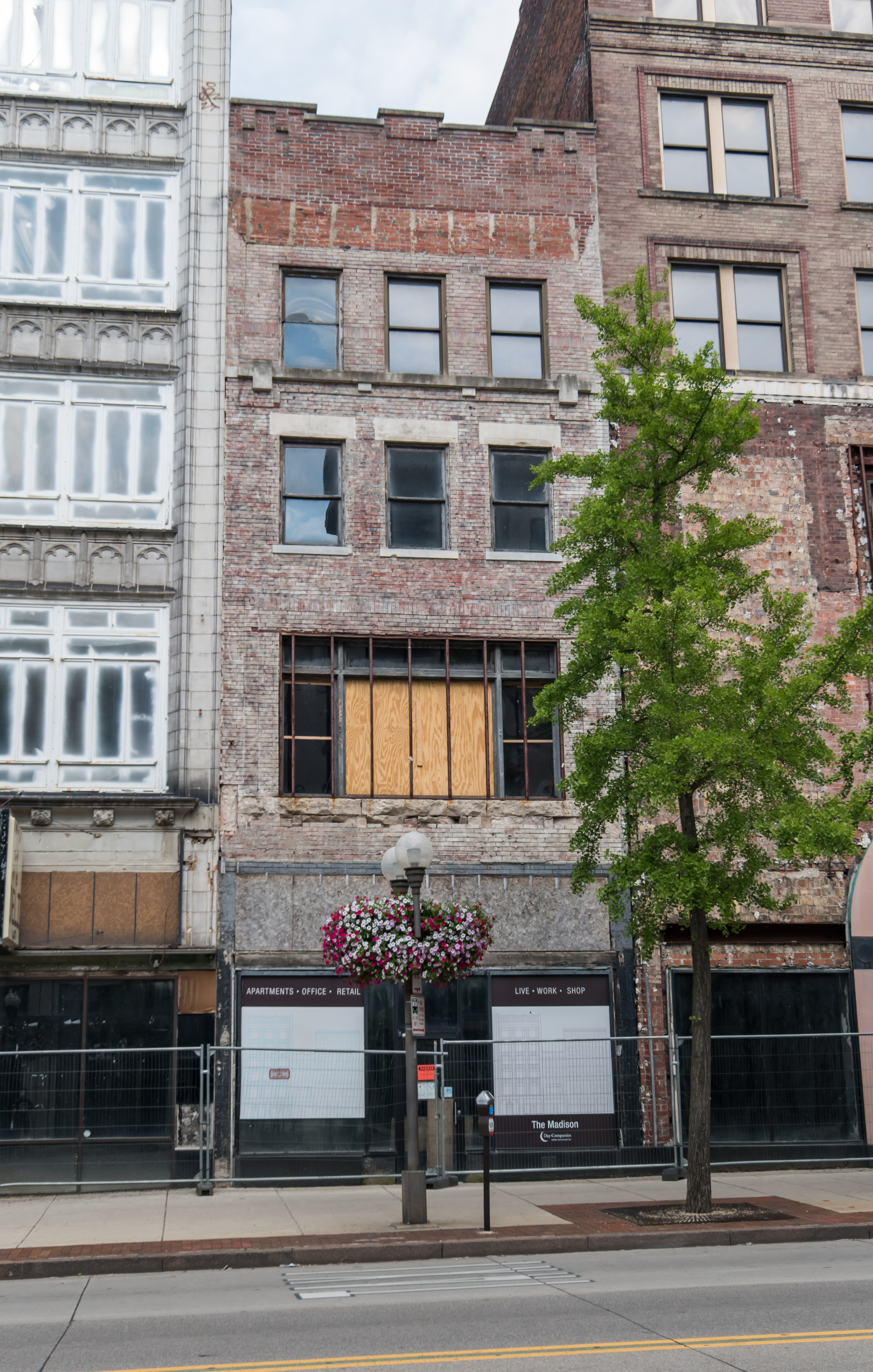
78 North High (non-contributing)

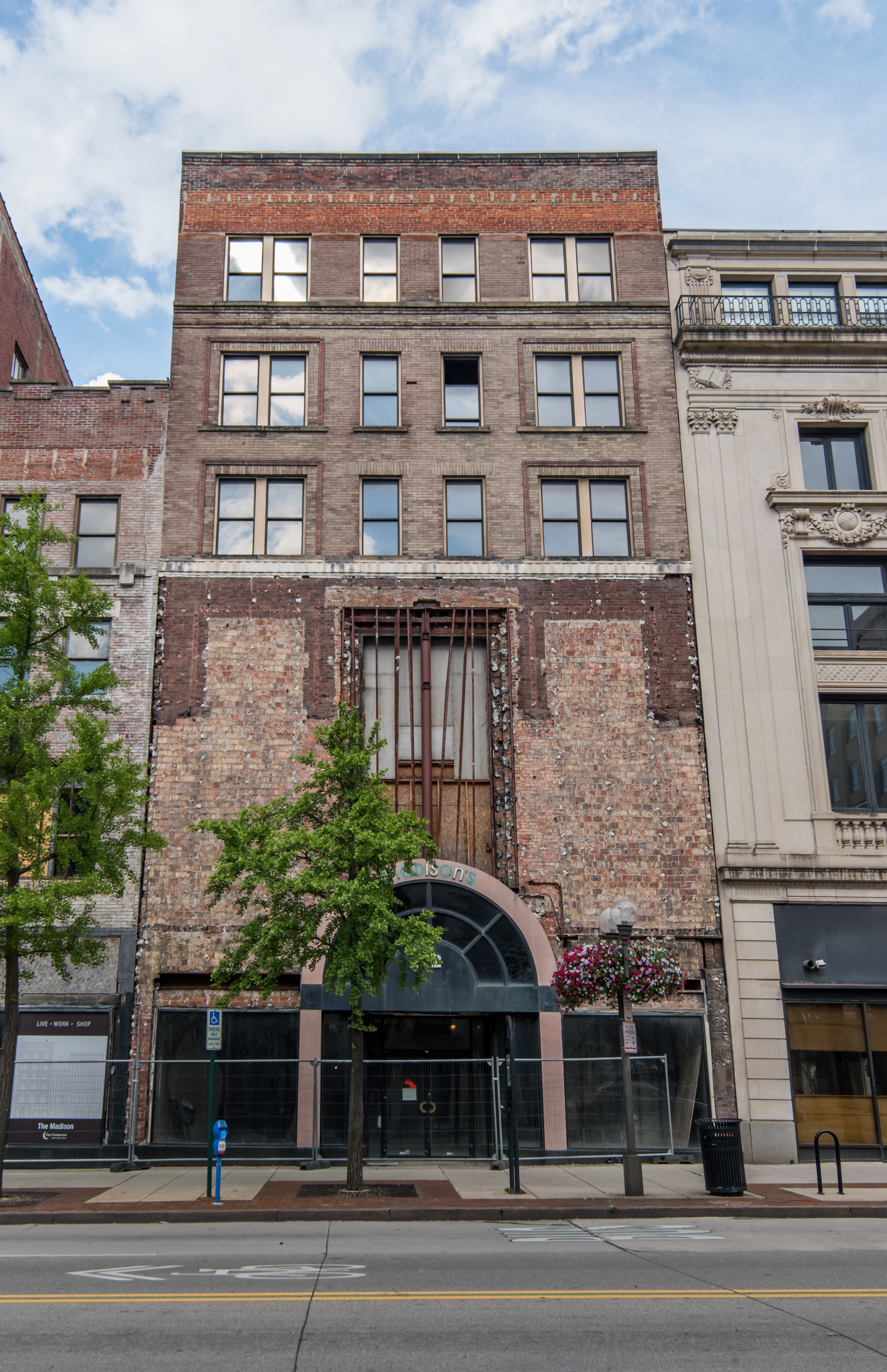
72-74 North High

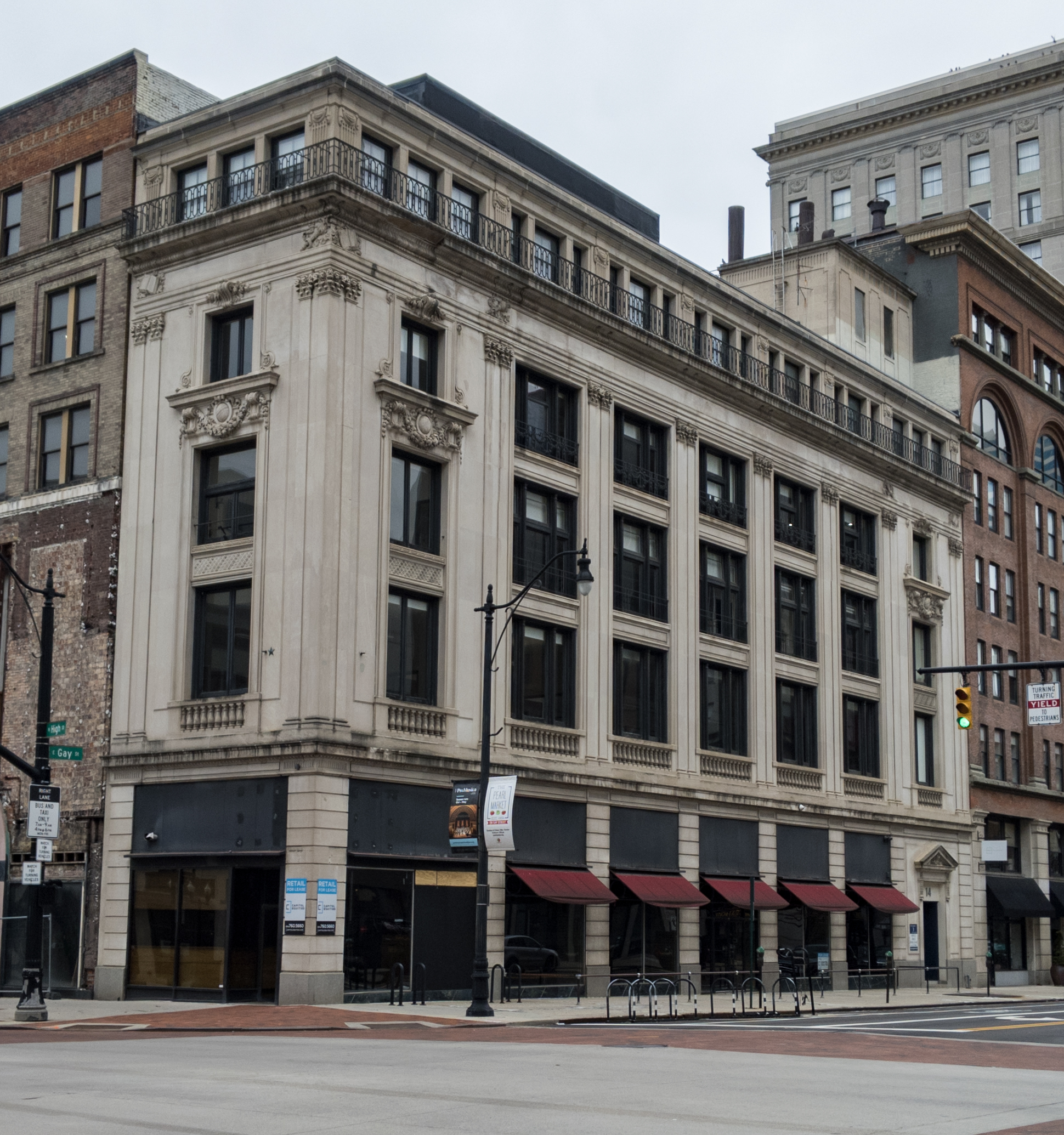
66-68 North High

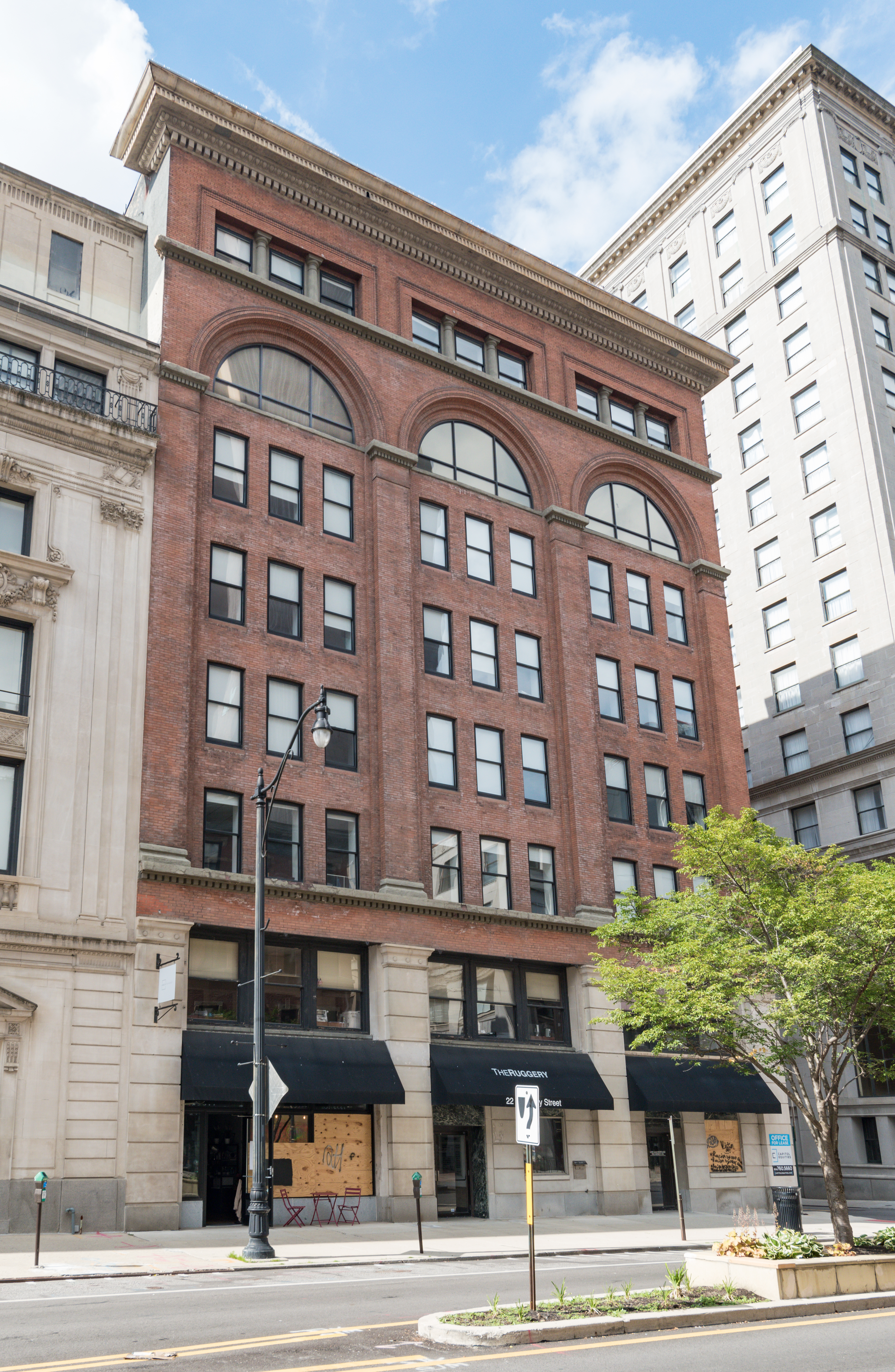
20-24 East Gay (Ruggery Building)

== See also ==
- Current (sculpture)
- National Register of Historic Places listings in Columbus, Ohio
