= White–Haines Building =

- U.S. Historic district – Contributing property
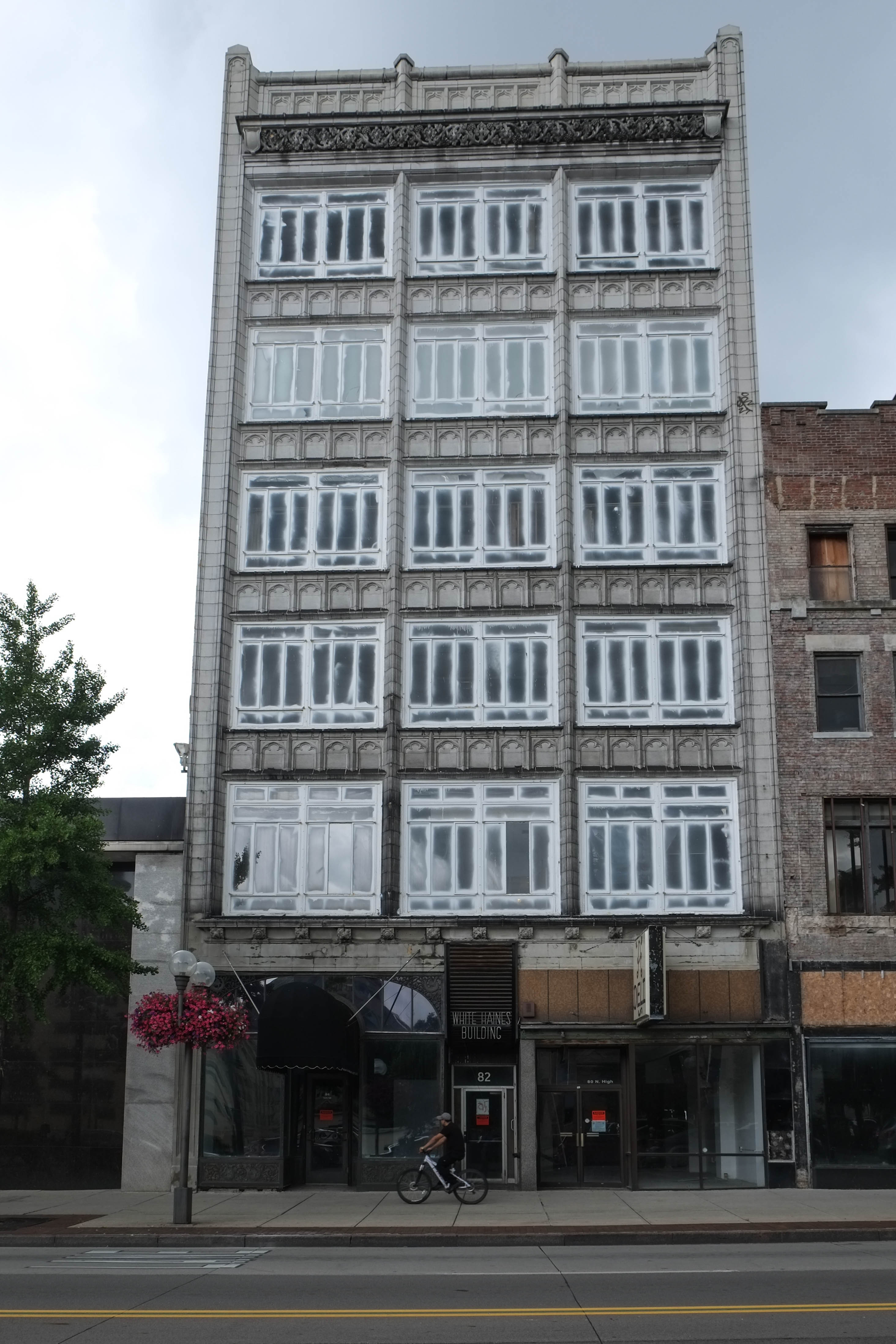
- Interactive map highlighting the building's location
- Location: 82 N High Street, Columbus, Ohio
- Coordinates: 39°57′51″N 83°00′02″W
- Built: 1913
- Architect: Richards, McCarty & Bulford
- Part of: High and Gay Streets Historic District (ID14000041)
- Added to NRHP: March 4, 2014

The White–Haines Building, also known as C. O. Haines Optical Company Building, is a historic building located at 82 North High Street in Downtown Columbus, Ohio. The building is part of the High and Gay Streets Historic District on the National Register of Historic Places.

The building has a concrete frame, glazed terra-cotta exterior in a grid of pilasters and horizontal spandrels. It is adorned in leaf motifs (trefoil or cloverleaf) and the north storefront that was once a jewelry store has detailed bronze-colored metal. It was built in 1913 and designed by Richards, McCarty & Bulford.

== See also ==
- National Register of Historic Places listings in Columbus, Ohio
