= Jorrit Tornquist =

Austrian artist (1938–2023)

- Born: March 26, 1938; Graz, Austria
- Died: May 17, 2023 (aged 85); Ponte San Pietro, Italy
- Citizenship: Italian
- Education: Polytechnic University in Graz
- Known for: Visual artist, color consultant, color theorist

Jorrit Tornquist (26 March 1938 – 17 May 2023) was an Austrian-Italian visual artist, color consultant, and color theorist. In 1992, he obtained Italian citizenship.

== Biography ==
He was born in Graz, Austria, on 26 March 1938.

Initially, Tornquist studied biology. In 1958, at the Polytechnic University in Graz, he decided to take up architecture. Under the guidance of one professor named Winkler, Tornquist dedicated himself to both sculpting and painting, focusing on figurative.

From 1959, he focused on an in-depth study of color principles and color effects, and contemporarily launched his artistic career.

Tornquist had interest in the political and artistic movements that promote social transformation; he was a pacifist and refused to carry out military service. He moved to Italy. Thanks to Getulio Alviani's help, he established himself in Sesto San Giovanni.

In 1966, he staged his first one-man show at the Vismara Gallery in Milan.

In the same year, he took part in the Forum Stadtpark in Graz. In 1967, together with Richard Kriesche and Helga Philipp, Tornquist signed the founding manifesto of the "Gruppo Austria", which aims to direct the Austrian culture towards new artistic languages.

Successively, he set up the Team Color Group (1972), became member of the Color Center of Tokyo (1974) and actively participated in the Surya group (1977), theorized by the critic Enzo Biffi Gentili.

Parallel to his artistic practices, Tornquist started his career as color consultant with a project for the Caffetteria dello Studente in Graz (1966, in collaboration with Arch. Jorg Mayr), then gradually he began to deal with important architectural sites, among which stands out the incineration plant in Brescia (1996).

In 1987, Tornquist created a performance titled "Apartheid" in Graz, his home town, which was done with the express intention of raising public awareness towards all living forms.

In 1992, he obtained Italian citizenship, though he maintained his Austrian one throughout.

In 1995, he built up the Color & Surface group Barcelona-Milano-Wien, which undertakes chromatic interventions for public and private projects.

Tornquist died at his home in Ponte San Pietro on 17 May 2023, at the age of 85.

== Critical texts ==
- U. Apollonio, "Jorrit Tornquist", in Catalogo, Vismara Arte Contemporanea, Milan, 1966.
- G. Dorfles, in Catalogo, Cenobio Visualità, Milan, 1970.
- L. Caramel, in Catalogo, Vismara Arte Contemporanea, Milan, 1971.
- W. Skreiner, in Catalogo di Farbe Empfindung Gefühlsraum, Neue Galerie, Graz, 1973.
- G. Dorfles, Team colore, Milan, 1974.
- E. Biffi Gentili, "Libero da Gestalt?", in Tornquist 1959–78, Museo, Alessandria, 1978.
- A. Veca, in Catalogo di Mostra Antologica, Pinacoteca Comunale, Macerata, 1979.
- C. Belloli, in Colore come opposizione di luce-ombra dalle minicromie ai luciumbratili spazializzanti, Arte Struktura, Milan, 1980.
- W. Skreiner, "Continuità e apertura nell'opera di Jorrit Tornquist", 1980, in Catalogo della mostra Jorrit Tornquist 1959–1995, Studio F22, Palazzolo sull'Oglio, 1995.
- E. Biffi Gentili, "Introduzione", in J. Tornquist, Colore e luce, Hoepli Editrice, Milan, 1983.
- W. Titz, "Bagliori in una scatola di latta – Notizie su Tornquist", in Catalogo Jerseits von Farbe, Neue Galerie am Landesmuseum Joanneum, Graz, 1987.
- E. Gombrich, L’apprendista stregone, Faenza, 1990.
- W. Titz, Macule cieche, Graz, 1993.
- A. Veca, 1990, in Catalogo della mostra Jorrit Tornquist 1959–1995, Studio F22, Palazzolo sull'Oglio, 1995.
- E. Biffi Gentili, "Jorrit Tornquist, o della vaghezza", 1994, in Catalogo della mostra Jorrit Tornquist 1959–1995, Studio F22, Palazzolo sull'Oglio, 1995.
