= Gastón Ugalde =

Bolivian artist, painter, photographer and sculptor (1944–2023)

Gaston Ugalde
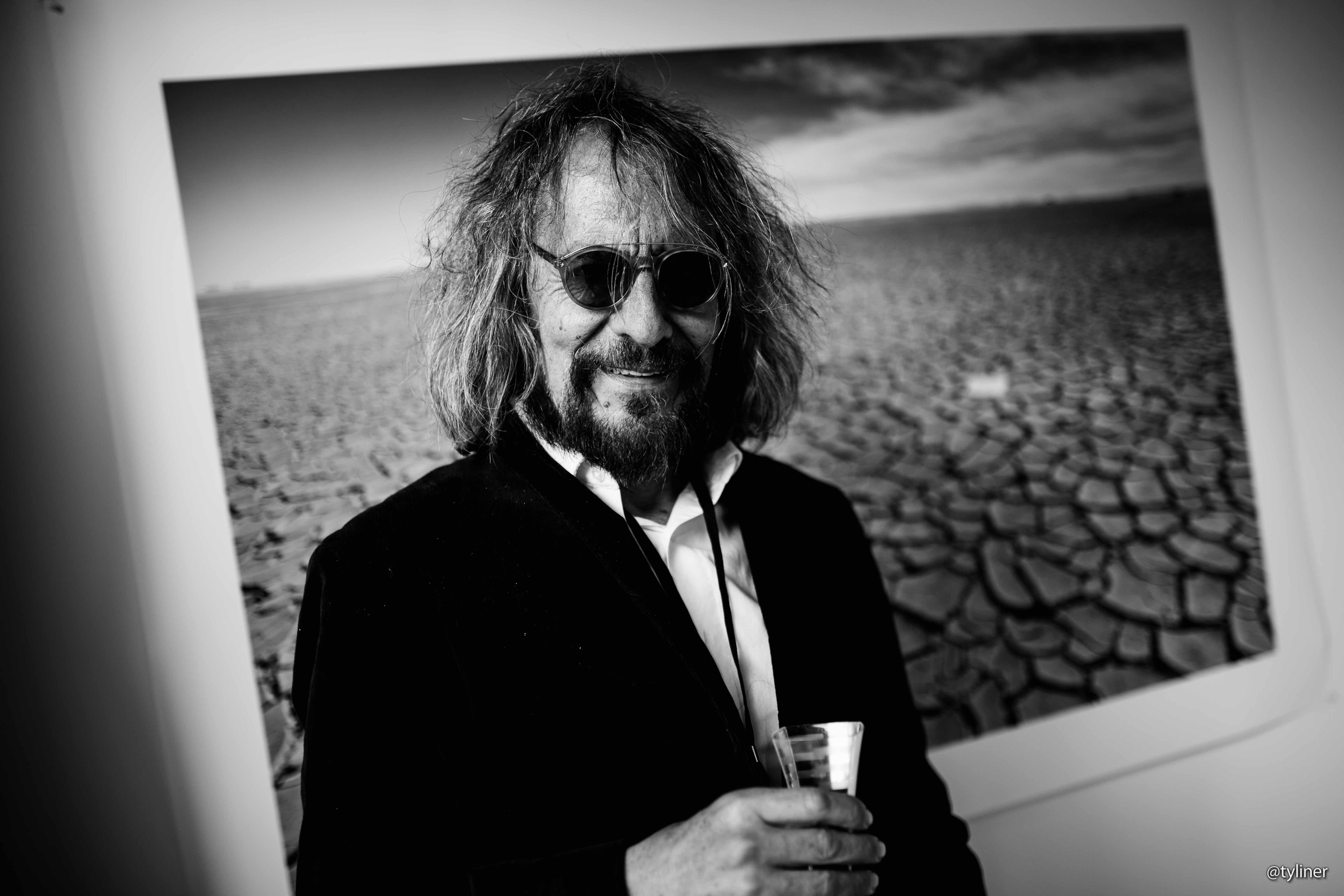
- Ugalde in 2014
- Born: Gaston Ugalde; 1 July 1944; La Paz, Bolivia
- Died: 14 October 2023 (aged 79); Rio de Janeiro, Brazil
- Education: Bachelor of Fine Arts
- Alma mater: Vancouver School of Art
- Occupation: Artist

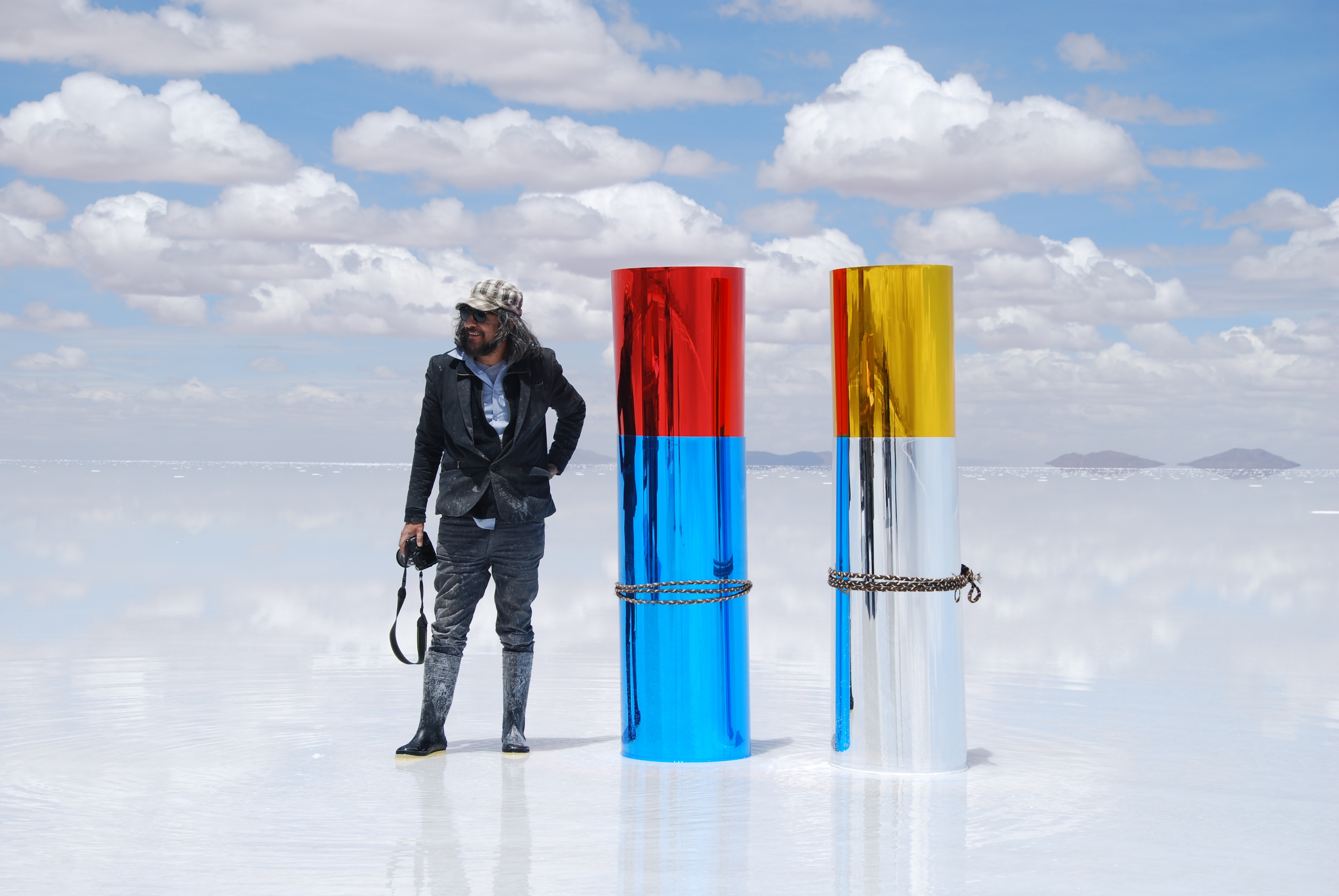
Gaston Ugalde portrait at the Salt Desert

Gastón Ugalde (1 July 1944 – 14 October 2023) is considered the father of contemporary bolivian art and was the recipient of the prestigious Konex Award in 2002 along with Oscar Niemeyer. Ugalde was named "the most important living Bolivian artist" by the Konex Foundation in Argentina and was also referred to as the "Andean Warhol" by art critics. Ugalde was also known as "the enfant terrible" of the Bolivian Art Scene.

"Ugalde was Bolivia’s best-known contemporary artist. Born in the city of La Paz, Ugalde was known, despite his decades-long career, as the "enfant terrible" of the local art world for the subversive nature, both conceptually and materially, of his artwork. Throughout Ugalde's extensive career, his works span a diversity of media, including painting, photography, collage, installation, and performance."

Spanning a half-century career, he was considered a video-art pioneer in Latin America and his work included performance, painting, sculpture, installation, land-art, photography, and printmaking. From 1972 he had over 90 solo shows and over 100 collective exhibitions all over the world. He represented his home country at important biennales such as Venice (2009, 2001), São Paulo (1978, 1981, 1985), Paris (1982), Havana (1986, 1999), Bienal do Mercosul (1997, 2015), and Trienal de Chile (2009).

Gastón Ugalde died on 14 October 2023, at the age of 79.

== Selected exhibitions ==
2023

Homage solo how Pinta Miami Salar Gallery

2022

Way Home I Shanghai

Heritages et Syncretisms I Slato Parra Paris

Visiones Geometricas I Alex Slato Gallery Miami

Solo-show The Colors of Salt - La Cometa Gallery Madrid

Solo-show The Red Thread - Salar Galeria de Arte

2021

New Beginnings I Salar Galeria de Arte

Mi primer largometraje solo-show I Cinemateca La Paz

2020

ZONAMACO solo-show project curated by Johann Mergenthaler

Pinta Miami Live Edition

Heterotopia casona Bickencbach curated by Cecilia Baya

2019

Illimani In-situ, curated by María Isabel Villagómez

Peru Arte Contemporaneo, PArC 2019 solo show

2018

Choqueyapu solo show Puro Gallery La Paz

Illimani solo show Puro Gallery La Paz

Atemporal, Solo show Manzana 1 Santa Cruz curated by Cecilia Bayá

2017

Photo London Guest Artist, Somerset House

Lima Photo solo-show

Recent Works, Solo show Salar Galería de Arte, La Paz

2016

Art and Territory - Gallery Kayafas, Boston, MA curated by Arlette Kayafas

Outland – Fabien Castanier Gallery Los Angeles

2015

Bienal 10 do Mercosul - Porto Alegre, Brasil

Altitude Threads - Ministry of Nomands London UK curated by María Vega

Rituals et Dependances Galerie Celal Paris

2014

Territorios de la imagen, selection of the Juan Mulder collection, Lima

(un)real Maddox Gallery, London UK Animals in the Walls, London UK curated by Laura Culpan

Paris Photo LA – solo show

Bolivar Hall, London UK

Museo de América, Madrid

2013

I Bienal del Sur, Panama

IX Buenos Aires Photo – Invited artist

Reality Check, MassArt Boston curated by Lisa Tung

Monumental Installation IADB, Washington, D.C.

Smithsonian, American Indian MuseumIntersection

Museum of Latin American Art Long Beach, California

Coral Gables Museum, Florida USA

Art-Lima, Perú

Intersections, Museum of Latin American Art Long Beach CA

2012

Art Platform Los Angeles

HFAF – Houston, TX

ART Monaco

Pinta London solo show

Almas de Sal, Museo Nacional de Arte - La Paz curated by José Bedoya

2011

ARTBO Bogotá – solo show

Boundaries, Museum of Latin American Art Long Beach California

Houston Fine Art Fair

The Latin American rEvolution, Miami

Art Palm Beach

ARTbeat Washington DC

Miamicito, Dot 51 Gallery Miami

Pinta NY

Modern Panic, London curated by James Elphick

Buenos Aires Photo solo show

Rostros Shamanicos, Galería Christopher Paschall Siglo XXI Bogotá

Pinta London

Down and Under - HACS

2010

Saatchi Gallery, London

Villa Hais Museum, Berlin

Museum Am Dom Trier

Siguaraya Gallery, Berlin

2009

53rd Venice Biennale

Trienal, Santiago de Chile curated by Ticio Escobar

2008

Nota Gallery - La Paz

Art Santa Fe solo show, New Mexico

Arteamericas Miami

2007

Bienal de Valencia Valencia

Casa de las Américas - Madrid

2006

Cuerpos Pintados São Paulo

2005

Museo de Arte Moderno La Paz

Necker Island – British Virgin Islands

2004

Museum of Contemporary Art Santiago

La Recoleta Buenos Aires

Cuerpos Pintados Santiago

N Gallery Düsseldorf

Cuerpos Pintados Buenos Aires

2002

Evan Gallery, New York

2001

49th Venice Biennale

1999

XII Bienal de la Habana

1997

I Visual Arts Biennial of MERCOSUR; Porto Alegre

1996

Museum of Contemporary Art, Santiago Chile

1992

Seville Expo '92; Seville

1991

Museum of Contemporary Art, Caracas

1990

Mito y Magia en las Américas: "Los ochenta" Museo de Arte Contemporáneo de Monterrey, Monterrey

1989

II Cuenca's Biennial of Painting; Cuenca

1987

I Cuenca's Biennial of Painting; Cuenca 1986 VII Biennial of San Juan; Latin-American & Caribbean Engraving

IV Latin-American Biennial; New York International Biennial of Painting; Miami II Bienal de la Habana; Havana

1985

XVII Biennial of São Paulo; São Paulo Neo-Expressionism de Tres Continentes; Teyler Gallery,

VIII Biennial of Graphics; Cayman Gallery, New York

1984

Neo-Expressionism from Three Continents, Teyler Gallery, VA

New Forms of Figuration, Center for Inter-American Relations, NY

1983

VI Biennial of San Juan; Latin-American & Caribbean Engraving

1982

XII Biennial of Paris; Paris

1981 V Biennial of San Juan; Latin-American & Caribbean Engraving

1980

IV Biennial of Maldonado; Museum of American Art, Maldonado

Huntington Art Gallery, Austin, Texas

1979

XV Biennial of São Paulo; São Paulo

1978

I Biennial; Latin-American Art; São Paulo
