= Taking Venice =

Taking Venice is a 2023 documentary film which details the effort to make Robert Rauschenberg the winner of the Grand Prize at the 32nd Venice Biennale in 1964.
