= Jay Lynn Gomez =

American artist (born 1986)

- Born: Jay Lynn Gomez (formerly Ramiro Gomez); 1986 (age 39–40); San Bernardino, California, U.S.
- Education: California Institute for the Arts
- Known for: Artist
- Spouse: David Feldman
- Patrons: Charlie James Gallery

Jay Lynn Gomez (formerly Ramiro Gomez; born 1986) is an American painter based in West Hollywood, California. Her artwork addresses social justice issues, focusing specifically on topics of immigration, race, and labor. Much of her work highlights the efforts of unseen laborers who maintain landscapes and produce luxury products.

== Early life ==
Born in 1986 in San Bernardino, California, Jay Lynn Gomez is the child of two formerly-undocumented Mexican immigrants. Gomez adopted the nickname "Jay" in her childhood to distinguish herself from her father, Ramiro Gomez Sr. Jay's parents, hailing from different parts of the Mexican countryside (west of Mexico City and south of Guadalajara), left for the United States in the 1970s. Her mother and father arrived in California separately without legal documentation. They married one year before Jay's birth in 1985, and later became US citizens following the births of their second daughter. Gomez spent her childhood admiring the tireless work of her mother, Maria Elena, a school custodian, and her father Ramiro Sr., a Costco truck driver. While her parents worked, Gomez's grandmother took care of her and her sisters, assuming a vital role in her upbringing and providing her with unwavering support as she came to terms with her sexuality.

Throughout her childhood, Gomez grappled with her sexual identity, identifying at the time as male and understanding that her attraction to other boys was disapproved of by her traditional Mexican family. Following the initial shock, her family came to support her homosexuality. Shortly after graduating from high school, Gomez met a photographer and filmmaker David Feldman. The pair are now married and live in West Hollywood. Feldman plays a critical role in the documentation and preservation process of Gomez's work. Before her cardboard cutouts are either stolen, thrown out, or destroyed, Feldman photographs the artwork in its intended position and location. These images are then hung in Charlie James Gallery exhibitions, as well as others nationwide. In late March 2021, Gomez posted on Instagram that she is a trans woman. In the post, she expressed gratitude to friends and family for their support.

== Education and early career ==
Throughout her childhood, Gomez found school assignments and classes tedious. Nevertheless, she excelled in the art studio, eventually resulting in a partial scholarship to the California Institute of the Arts Due to a combination of financial struggles and the passing of her grandmother, Gomez dropped out of CalArts after one year. In order to make a living, Gomez secured a job as a private nanny for a Los Angeles family, which she began in September 2009. She held this job for two years and it provided her with the stability she had lacked previously. Not only did it provide a steady income and a reliable living situation, but it also allowed Gomez to work alongside people whose backgrounds resembled hers, reminding her of her family's Latino immigrant roots.

During these two years when Gomez cared for the family's children, she began her first artistic series, Domestic Scenes, which documented her daily experiences and observations of the other workers in the home and the neighborhood. As the children napped, Gomez would retreat to her room so that she could paint loose representations of her fellow workers, depicting male workers in their outdoor sphere tending to the lawn and pool and female housekeepers cleaning the interiors.

== Artistic career ==
=== Early works ===
While working as a nanny, Gomez would look at issues of Luxe, Dwell, Architectural Digest, and Elle Décor displayed in her employer's home. Upon flipping through the pages, Gomez found the images devoid of the workers who maintained the advertised domestic lifestyle. This realization prompted her to begin her series, Domestic Scenes (2012–present), in which she superimposes domestic workers onto advertisements in high-end magazines to reinsert an image of the Latino community into the public consciousness. Gomez depicts the figures of housekeepers, nannies, and gardeners completing their daily duties in the Chicano Rasquache style, as a way to both, acknowledge and document their lives and labor.

Gomez gives each of her workers a Latino name such as Maria, Lupita, or Carmen but renders the figures with loose and rough strokes that blur any identifiable facial features, which writer Katharine Schwab states "reframes the David Hockney paintings and glossy magazine advertisements he takes for inspiration, putting the lives of California’s near-invisible and individually disposable workers front and center." In addition to their names, most of her figures are presented with dark skin and brown hair to fully represent the archetype of a Latino domestic worker. The series acts as a photo study, documenting the figures that advertisements have erased from the narrative. These images earned Gomez recognition within the art world, resulting in her partnership with the California-based art dealer Charlie James Gallery.

=== Waiting for Checks ===
In Jay Lynn Gomez's series of “Waiting for Checks (2013-present)” paintings of domestic women working, Gomez's intent is to demonstrate the boundaries of the domestic worker's experience. Through her art, Gomez contributes to providing relevance of domestic labor. She mentions how art pieces can be hanged in a wealthy home and just be seen as a regular painting of art. The message of the art is showing the importance and labor of domestic workers. In the article by David Brody titled, Painting Labor: Ramiro Gomez's Representations of Domestic Work”, “Yvette Waits for Her Check speaks to the boundaries that delimit the experience of the domestic worker (pg.157).” This is an example that domestic women workers are not allowed to receive their payment until after they do their work because of the high expectations of their boss. Jay Lynn Gomez's art shows the injustice of “class, race, gender and immigration (pg.158).”

=== My Cousins and My Aunts without my Tío Carlos ===
Gomez painted this to demonstrate her personal family's struggle after her uncle was deported in 2018. In the painting, “a man-shaped hole in a family portrait marks the spot where a graduate’s father should have been”. Gomez leaves the figures in her portrait faceless, but right next to the graduate is an empty space while the rest of the family is standing next to each other

=== David Hockney ===
Gomez has stated that she sees David Hockney as a personal hero and an influence for many of her works, as well as helping her to openly embrace her queerness. Hockney is known for creating idealistic depictions of Los Angeles, California. His modernist style rendered the splendor of Los Angeles residents, homes and pop culture. Gomez sought to revise Hockney's compositions by including the implied characters who work to maintain the depicted beauty as well as to portray dark-skinned workers, diverting the focus of the piece from luxury to labor. Gomez reimagined Hockney's A Bigger Splash (1967), with her version, No Splash, which she completed in 2014. While Gomez's reproduction does not depict Hockney's large splash in the foreground, it does include two faceless workers in the background who clean windows and rake the pool. Gomez's painting is currently in the Metropolitan Correctional Center, San Diego's (MCA San Diego) permanent collection.

=== Cardboard cutouts ===
Gomez crosses mediums to cardboard to represent Latino gardeners, custodians, and workers in her series entitled Cut-Outs. In this series, Gomez's main objective was "to slow people down, to have them double-take, to make them take notice and see" the cardboard figures that she placed along the sidewalks, on lawns, and against buildings. Gomez paints loose renderings of people on life-size cardboard cutouts, which she collects from the dumpsters behind a Best Buy at the corner of Santa Monica Boulevard and La Brea Avenue. While the destinations and arrangements for each figure are carefully thought out and executed, Gomez knows that the cutouts’ lives are short-lived as they are either stolen, thrown out or destroyed. According to Gomez, the disposability of the cardboard figures acts as commentary on the perceived replaceability of domestic and maintenance workers. Gomez's husband, photographer David Feldman, photographs images of the cutouts for exhibitions nationwide. In 2013, the UCLA Chicano Studies Research Center at UCLA offered Gomez her first solo exhibition, entitled Luxury Interrupted, to present images of her cutouts.

Gomez displays most of her cutouts throughout the lawns, street corners, and playgrounds of Beverly Hills and West Hollywood, which she says is intended to force passersby to recognize who maintains the city and cares for its children. In 2012, Gomez planted four cardboard Latino workers on the hedge of actor George Clooney’s home prior to a fundraiser event that President Obama was to attend. One of the figures displayed a sign that read "We are all American". Her intent was to demonstrate the political dimensions of her art by both representing and humanizing her subjects. According to Katharine Schwab, Gomez uses the power and accessibility of street art to force society to recognize who maintains city and cares for its children. Gomez explains that "it was strange; actual humans involved in their labor had become invisible to most people, but the image of a human, there, in the middle of your day, and not at some museum or gallery, but there in the middle of your path, somehow that registered."

In 2017, LACMA announced the inclusion of Gomez's works from the series, Cut-Outs (2015), in their permanent collection.

== Recent works ==
In 2017, artist Rafa Esparza invited Gomez to the Whitney Biennial in New York to participate in his exhibition, Figure Ground: Beyond the White Field. While working at the Whitney, Gomez observed the custodians, security guards, and staff members, documenting images on her phone so that she could later create cardboard cutouts of these subjects. In the week prior to the Biennial, she gifted these subjects with their cardboard representations, giving them recognition for their labor.

Also in 2017, Gomez's work was part of the group exhibition, Home---So Different, So Appealing, at the Los Angeles County Museum of Art (LACMA). Both the UCLA Chicano Studies Research Center and the Museum of Fine Arts, Houston, partnered with LACMA for this exhibition. The exhibit served as part of the J. Paul Getty Museum’s Pacific Standard Time: LA/LA, an initiative that seeks to promote an appreciation and exploration of Latino and Latin American Art in Los Angeles.

In 2024, her work was included in Xican-a.o.x. Body, an expansive group exhibition at the Pérez Art Museum Miami, Florida, showcasing artworks by Chicano artists from the 1960s to the present day. The show was curated by feminist art historian Cecilia Fajardo-Hill, and curators Marissa Del Toro, and Gilbert Vicario. The exhibition accompanying catalog was published by Chicago University Press.

== Exhibitions ==
Gomez's work has been exhibited at: LACMA, the Museum of Latin American Art (MOLAA), the Smithsonian National Portrait Gallery, the Denver Art Museum, MCA San Diego, MFA Houston, the Torrance Art Museum, the Nerman Museum of Contemporary Art, the Cornell Fine Arts Museum, New York, the Boston Museum of Fine Arts, Massachusetts, Pérez Art Museum Miami, Florida, and many others.

Her story and her work have been discussed in a variety of news outlets, including: The New Yorker, The Atlantic, The Washington Post, The New York Times Magazine, Hyperallergic, the Los Angeles Times, The Huffington Post, and on NPR and CNN among others.

== Awards ==
- 2014 L.A. Weekly People
- 2014 2013 25 Artists to Watch, Artvoices Magazine
- 2013 100 Green Leaders in Art, Poder Magazine
