= Ted Bonin =

Art dealer and cofounder of art gallery

Theodore Bonin (1958 - 2023) was a New York City art dealer and cofounder of the Alexander and Bonin art gallery until his death in 2023 (aged 65). His death was one of the many factors that led to the gallery's closing.
