= Karim Bennani =

Moroccan painter (1936–2023)

- Born: 2 January 1936; Fez, Morocco
- Died: 3 January 2023 (aged 87)
- Education: Beaux-Arts de Paris; Académie Julian
- Occupation: Painter

Karim Bennani (Arabic: كريم بناني; 2 January 1936 – 3 January 2023) was a Moroccan painter.

== Biography ==
Bennani was born in Fez on 2 January 1936. He initially pursued commercial studies before leaving in 1951 to attend the Académie des arts de Fès. In 1954, he enrolled in the Beaux-Arts de Paris and also studied at the Académie Julian. In 1957, he exhibited his works at the Galerie du Bac in Paris and was invited to the Biennale d'Alexandrie. In 1967, he exhibited at the Galerie Charpentier in Paris.

Upon his return to Morocco, Bennani worked for the national tourist office and Royal Air Maroc. He was a founding member of the Association Marocaine des Arts Plastiques in 1972 and became its first president, serving until 2003.

Karim Bennani died on 3 January 2023, one day after his 87th birthday.

== Works ==
- Oil on canvas, untitled (1968)
