= Lucinda Hinojos =

American visual artist (born 1981)

Lucinda Hinojos (born 1981), also known as 'La Morena' is a visual artist and muralist.

== Biography ==
Hinojos was born in Glendale, Arizona. Lucinda grew up playing soccer and didn't get into art until later in life. She attended Glendale Community College for three years. Her artworks are often a representation of her background as a Chicana and her indigenous descent.

== Art ==
Hinojos is a visual artist, muralist and the first Chicana and Indigenous artist to work with the National Football League. Popular works of hers include the Super Bowl mural, which she created by working with Native American artists, including Randy Barton (Dine/Navajo descent), Anitra "Yukue" Molina (Yaqui descent) and Carrie "CC" Curley (San Carlos Apache descent) to produce the largest Super Bowl Mural to date located on the Monarch Theatre. The 2023 Super Bowl ticket art, she was responsible for the Super Bowl ticket art and honors her indigenous and Chicano roots in the image. The No More Stolen Sisters Mural is a mural Hinojos created to support the Missing and Murdered Indigenous Women epidemic. This mural led her to meet with Arizona Congressman Greg Stanton to discuss the issue of missing and murdered indigenous women.
