= Shellyne Rodriguez =

American visual artist and organizer

Shellyne Rodriguez (born 1977) is an American visual artist, organizer, and former adjunct.

== Education ==
Rodriguez earned a BFA in Visual & Critical Studies from the School of Visual Arts in 2011 and a MFA in Fine Art from Hunter College in 2014.

== Artistic practice ==
In 2014, Rodriguez attended the Shandaken Project Residency in the Catskills of New York. In 2015, she was artist-in-residence in the sculpture department at Hunter College. In 2017, Rodriguez collaborated with the Museum of Modern Art to create the Night Studio program, a free art class for New York City residents in the process of taking the TASC (Test Assessing Secondary Completion, formerly the GED). In 2018, Rodriguez was awarded the Percent for Art public sculpture commission to create a permanent public sculpture in the Bronx. Shellyne stated that the sculpture would serve as "a monument to the people of the Bronx." In 2018, the Whitney Museum of American Art released a video by Rodriguez in which she discussed Ja'Tovia Gary's film An Ecstatic Experience.

In 2019, Rodriguez became the inaugural artist-in-residence at The Latinx Project, an initiative based at NYU that is dedicated to Latinx studies. Rodriguez curated a show centered around ideas of displacement and how it affects the Latinx population in New York. The show included pieces by Rodriguez, Alicia Grullón, and anti-gentrification group Mi Casa No es Su Casa.

=== Selected exhibition history ===
- Siempre En La Calle: Calderón, October 28, 2021, to January 29, 2022
- PELEA: Visual Responses to Spatial Precarity, Latinx Project, NYU, 2019; curator: Shellyne Rodriguez
- BRONX NOW: Bronx River Art Center, July 14 to September 8, 2018; curated by Laura James and Eileen Walsh, who work under the name BXNYCreative
- Tamir Rice Photo Booth: Window Project, IMI Corona, Queens Museum, 2016; curator: Prerana Reddy

== Social-action activities ==
=== Community organizing ===
Rodriguez is a community organizer and an active member of the grassroots collective Take Back the Bronx. In March 2019, Rodriguez joined a group of Latinx scholars, artists, and activists in penning and signing a letter to El Museo del Barrio demanding change at the East Harlem institution.

Rodriguez is a member of Decolonize This Place and spoke at the ultimately successful May 2019 protests against Warren Kanders, owner of the defense manufacturing company Safariland and then-vice chair of the Whitney Museum of American Art, seeking to remove Kanders from its board.

=== Writing ===
Rodriguez has written for multiple publications, including Hyperallergic.

In an essay in which she describes herself as a "black Marxist", Rodriguez criticizes the practice of equating identities with "injury" and awarding "immunity" to people with the most identities, calling it a "lazy politics that doesn't require one to do any critical thinking or political work." She argues that "it is a system based on the state's logic of restitution and punishment, and fundamentally opposed to solidarity." What she prefers instead is political organizing and activity.

== New York Post incident ==
On Tuesday, May 2, 2023, Rodriguez confronted students which had set up a table of anti-abortion pamphlets near an art studio on the 11th floor of the North Building, calling it propaganda and tossing items off the table. Rodriguez issued an apology after Hunter College requested that she do so.

On May 23, 2023, a New York Post reporter and a photographer went to her home to interview and photograph her about the story. A spokesperson for Rodriguez said they did not identify themselves and did not use the intercom to gain access to knock on her unit's door. She held a machete to one of the reporters' necks and threatened them. She followed the journalists as they went back to their car and chased the photographer with the machete. Part of the confrontation was captured on a Post employee's dashcam. She was subsequently fired by Hunter College and the School of Visual Arts and arrested on charges of menacing and harassment.

In October 2023, Rodriguez took a plea deal. Through the deal, her misdemeanor charge of menacing will be withdrawn after she completes six months of behavioral therapy.

In January 2024, Rodriguez was fired from Cooper Union.
