= 2024 in art =

The year 2024 in art involved various significant events.

== Events ==
- January 23 – An illegally smuggled Hellenistic statuette of a Greek goddess is repatriated to Greece from the United States after sixteen years of negotiations.
- January 24 – South Korea's Ministry of Unification confirms that the Arch of Reunification, a sculptural arch near Pyongyang, North Korea, has been demolished.
- March 20 – Opening of the 81st Whitney Biennial in New York City, United States, lasting until August 11, 2024.
- April 20 – Opening of the 60th Venice Biennale, lasting until November 24, 2024.
- April 21 – A statue of Queen Elizabeth II of the United Kingdom, by Hywel Pratley, is unveiled in Oakham, Rutland, UK.
- May 16 – A statue of Billy Graham, by Chas Fagan, is erected at the United States Capitol, in Washington, D.C.
- May 25 – Opening of an exhibition of portraits of "Windrush generation", commissioned by King Charles III of the United Kingdom.
- June 4 – David Voss, alleged ringleader of Canada's biggest art fraud, pleads guilty to his involvement in the forgery of works by Norval Morrisseau.
- July 26 – A performance staged as part of the Opening Ceremony of the 2024 Summer Olympics in Paris, France, causes controversy when it is seen by some parties as mocking the Last Supper of Jesus Christ and more specifically Leonardo da Vinci's famous fresco depiction of it.
- September 10 – Glenn Lowry, the longest serving director in the history of the Museum of Modern Art (MoMA) in New York City announces that he will step down from that position in 2025 after thirty years as the museum's operating chief.
- September 20 – In Bologna, Italy the prolific Czech art vandal, Vaclav Pisvejc smashes an Ai Weiwei porcelain sculpture titled Porcelain Cube at the opening of the artist's exhibition at the Palazzo Fava Museum. This was the second high-profile smashing of a work by Ai Wei Wei as in 2014 Dominican-born Miami-based artist Maximo Caminero walked into the then recently opened Pérez Art Museum Miami in Miami, Florida, and destroyed one of twelve vases employed in an installation by the Chinese dissident artist.
- November 19 – René Magritte's painting The Empire of Light (1954) (from a series of 27 such works consisting of 17 oil paintings and 10 gouaches) sells for US$121.1 million at Christie's setting both a new record price for a Surrealist work of art at auction and for a work by the artist.

== Exhibitions ==
- March 20 until August 11 – The 81st Whitney Biennial (curated by Chrissie Iles and on partial view until September 29).
- March 23 until July 7 – Urban Art Evolution (curated by Christopher Pusey) at the Nassau County Museum of Art in Roslyn, New York
- March 26 until July 14 – Paris 1874 Inventing Impressionism at the Musée d'Orsay in Paris, France, then travels to the National Gallery of Art in Washington, D.C. from September 8 until January 19, 2024.
- March 27 until July 1 - Brancusi at the Centre Pompidou in Paris.
- April 15 – August 20 – The Boyz from the Museum (Scot Borofsky, Chrisropher Hart Chambers, Linus Coraggio, Al Diaz, Ken Hirastuka, and Rick Prol) at the ilon Gallery in Harlem, New York City.
- April 20 until November 24 – The 60th Venice Biennale.
- April 26 until October 13 – Rebecca Horn at the Haus der Kunst in Munich, Germany.
- May 7 until March 24, 2024 – Martha Jackson Jarvis: What the Trees Have Seen at the Baltimore Museum of Art in Baltimore, Maryland.
- June 14 until October 14 – Guillaume Lethière at the Clark Art Institute in Williamstown, Massachusetts. then named Guillaume Lethière: Born in Guadeloupe travels to the Musée du Louvre from November 13 until February 17. 2025,
- August 9 until August 20 - Henry Orlik: Cosmos of Dreams at the Maas Gallery in London.
- September- CJ Hendry: Flower Market at Four Freedoms Park on Roosevelt Island in New York City, New York.
- September 6 until January 5, 2025 – The Dance of Life: Figure and Imagination in American Art, 1876–1917 at the Yale University Art Gallery in New Haven, Connecticut.
- September 13 until October 26 – Joel Shapiro: Out of the Blue at Pace Gallery in New York City.
- September 14 until October 18 – The Found Art of Thom Corn at Wall Works in the Bronx, New York (curated by Nancy August).
- October 8 until February 9, 2025 - BAJ: Baj Chez Baj at the Palazzo Reale in Milan, Italy.
- October 9 until January 20, 2025 – Arte Povera (curated by Carolyn Christov-Bakargiev with works by Giovanni Anselmo, Alighiero Boetti, Pier Paolo Calzolari, Luciano Fabro, Jannis Kounellis, Mario Merz, Marisa Merz, Giulio Paolini, Pino Pascali, Giuseppe Penone, Michelangelo Pistoletto, Emilio Prini, and Gilberto Zorio). at the Bourse de Commerce in Paris, France.
- October 10 until January 3, 2025 - Ronnie Landfield, Recent Works, 2024 at Findlay Gallery, New York City.
- October 10 until February 2, 2025 - Jean Tinguely at the Pirelli HangarBicocca in Milan, Italy.
- October 12 until February 9, 2025 - Tamara de Lempicka (curated by Furio Rinaldi) at the De Young Museum in San Francisco, California, then traveled to the Museum of Fine Arts Houston in Houston, Texas from March 9, 2025 to July 6, 2025 (extended).
- October 13 until January 26, 2025 – Siena: The Rise of Painting, 1300–1350 at the Metropolitan Museum of Art in New York City; will travel to London's National Gallery in 2025
- October 24 until December 7 – Cecily Brown: The Five Senses at the Paula Cooper Gallery in New York City.
- October 25 until December 21 - Laurent Grasso: Artificialis at the Sean Kelly Gallery in New York City.
- October 25 until February 9, 2025 - Magritte at the Art Gallery of New South Wales
- October 31 - Continuing - Hajime Sorayama: Desire Machines at the Museum of Sex in Miami, Florida.
- November 1 until February 15, 2025 - Adrian Berg: Phantasmagoria at Hunter Dunbar Projects in New York City.
- November 7 until December 21 – James Little: Affirmed/Actions at Petzel in New York City.
- November 8 until March 9, 2025 - Harmony and Dissonance: Orphism in Paris, 1910–1930 at the Solomon R. Guggenheim Museum in New York City.
- November 13 until February 28, 2025 - Kenny Scharf at the Brant Foundation Study Center in New York City.
- December 5 until January 9, 2025 - Parmigianino: The Vision of Saint Jerome at the National Gallery in London.
- December 14 until March 29, 2025 - Jean Michel Basquiat: ENGADIN at Hauser & Wirth in St. Moritz, Switzerland.
- December 17 until March 15, 2025 - Reflections: Koons/Picasso at The Alhambra at the Museum of Fine Arts, Palace Charles V, in Granada, Spain.

== Awards ==
- Turner Prize: Jasleen Kaur.

== Works ==
- Omri Amrany and Oscar León – Statue of Dwyane Wade at the Kaseya Center in Miami, Florida.
- Iván Argote – Dinosaur commissioned for and displayed on the High Line in Manhattan, New York City
- Daniel Arsham – Statue of Priscilla Chan
- Alex Chinneck – Loop-de-Loop Canal Boat permanently installed on the Sheffield & Tinsley Canal in Sheffield, England
- Xenia Hausner – Atemluft
- Sabin Howard – A Soldier's Journey part of The National World War I Memorial in Pershing Park in Washington, D.C.
- Andrew Lacey – Statue of Thomas Stamford Raffles permanently installed in downtown Singapore.
- Louis – Bust of Elon Musk
- Ruth Patir - [M]otherland commissioned for the Israel pavilion at the 60th Venice Biennale.
- Alison Saar – "The Salon" (sculpture), Olympic sculpture commissioned for the Champs-Élysées in Paris, France.
- Joel Shapiro - ARK (completed)
- Basil Watson
  - Empathy (John Lewis Memorial)
  - Steadfast Stride Toward Justice

== Deaths ==
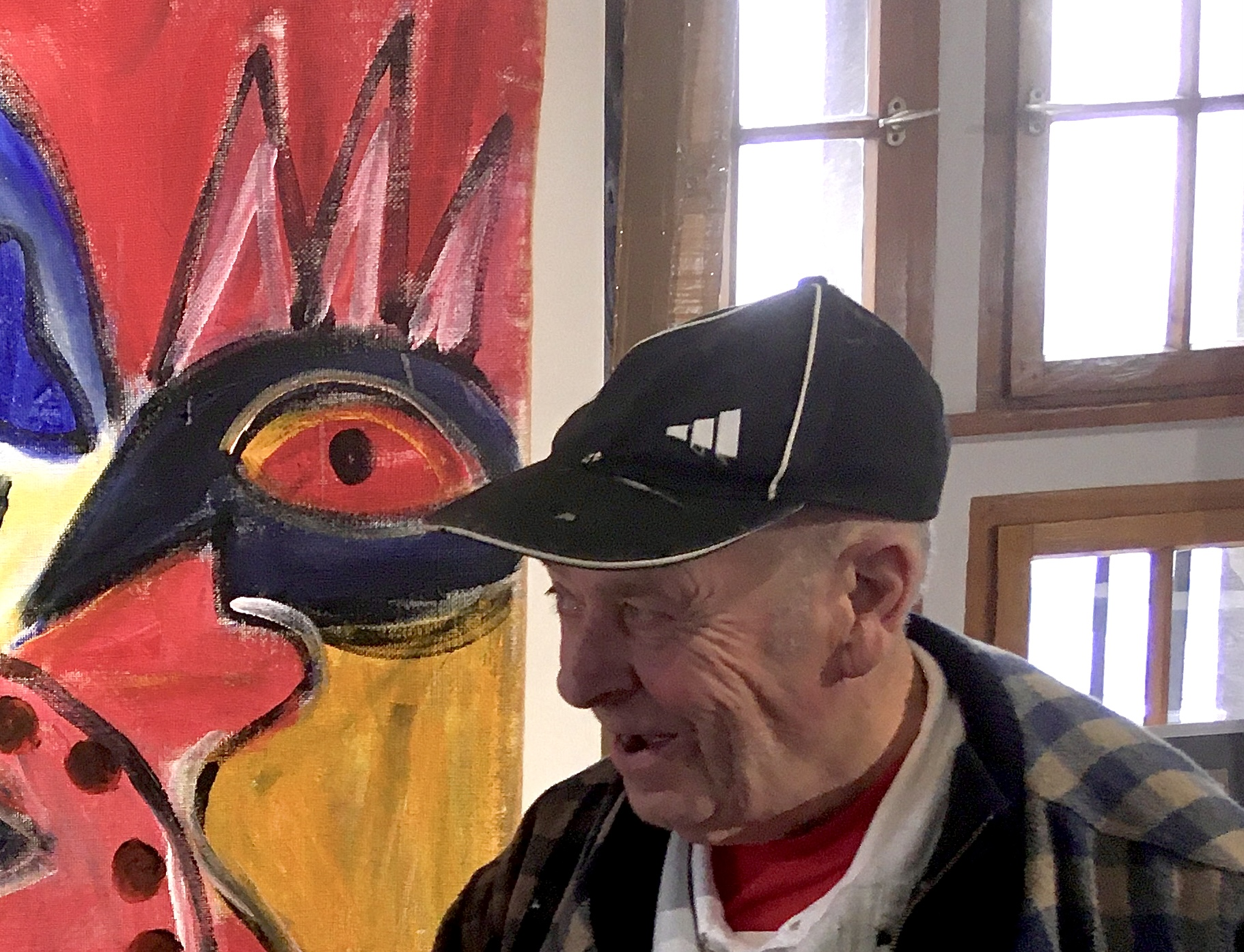
Hartmut Ritzerfeld in 2023

=== January ===
- January 1 – Hartmut Ritzerfeld, German neo-Expressive painter (born 1950)
- January 2 – Alexis Smith, American collage artist (born 1949)
- January 4 – Kishin Shinoyama, Japanese photographer (born 1940)
- January 15 – Brent Sikkema, American art dealer (born 1948)
- January 19 – Robert Whitman, American performance artist (born 1935)
- January 19 – Carl Andre, American minimalist artist (born 1935)
- January 26 – Ricardo Pascale, Uruguayan sculptor (born 1942)
- January 27 – Brian Griffin, British photographer (born 1948)

=== February ===
- February 4
  - Antonio Paolucci, Italian art historian and curator (born 1939)
  - Melvin Way, American folk artist (born 1954)
- February 5 – Helga Paris, German photographer (born 1938)
- February 8 – Andrew Crispo, American gallerist (born 1945)
- February 10
  - Günter Brus, Austrian painter, performance artist, graphic artist and filmmaker (born 1938)
  - A. Ramachandran, Indian painter (born 1935)
- February 16 – Aleš Lamr, Czech visual artist (born 1943)
- February 17 – Marc Pachter, American art curator (born 1943)
- February 28 – Félix Aráuz, Ecuadorian painter (born 1935)

=== March ===
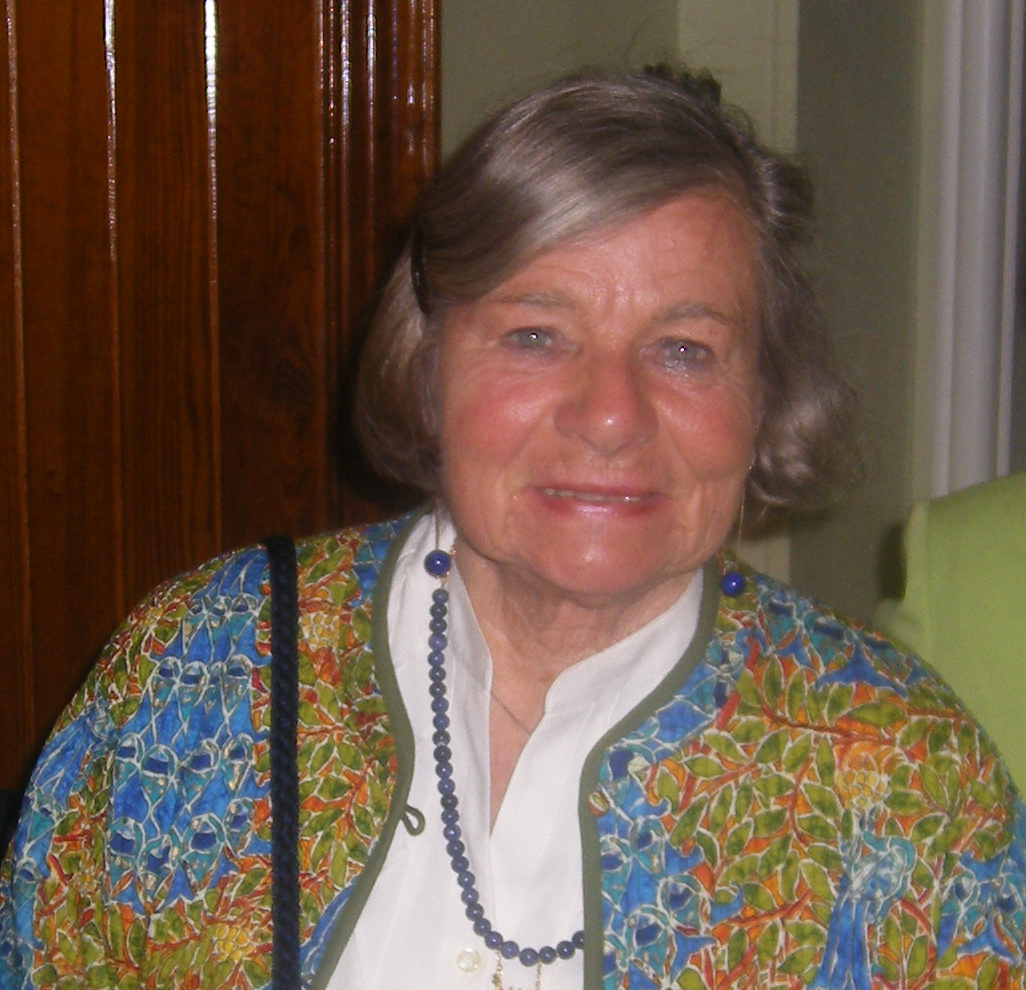
Imogen Stuart in 2011

- March 1
  - Iris Apfel, American designer (born 1921)
  - Chance Browne, American cartoonist (born 1948)
  - Ennio Calabria, Italian painter and illustrator (born 1937)
  - Akira Toriyama, Japanese manga artist (subdural hematoma; born 1955)
- March 6 (death announced) – Pigcasso, painting pig (born 2016)
- March 7 – Lucas Samaras, Greek-born American photographer, sculptor and painter (born 1936)
- March 12 – Yong Soon Min, South Korean-born American artist, curator, and educator (born 1953)
- March 24
  - Robert Moskowitz, American painter (born 1935)
  - Imogen Stuart, German-Irish sculptor (born 1927)
- March 26 – Richard Serra, American sculptor (born 1938)
- March 28 – Marian Zazeela, American light artist, designer, calligrapher, and painter (born 1940)
- March 29 – Katsura Funakoshi, Japanese sculptor (born 1951)
- March 30 – Quisqueya Henríquez, Cuban-born Dominican multidisciplinary contemporary artist (born 1951)

=== April ===
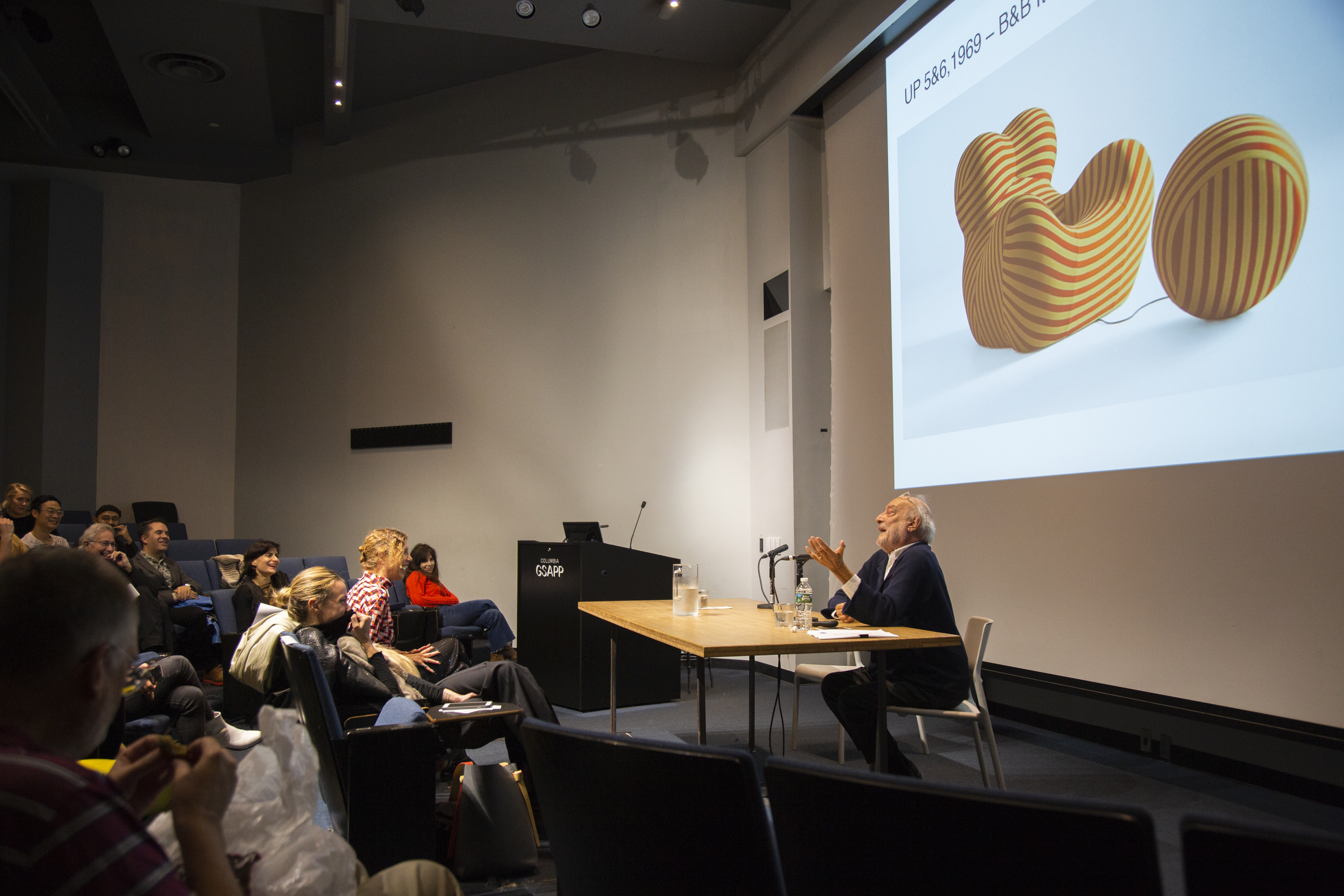
Gaetano Pesce in 2018

- April 3 – Gaetano Pesce, Italian architect and designer (born 1939)
- April 6
  - Italo Rota, Italian architect and curator (born 1953)
  - Ziraldo, Brazilian author, cartoonist and painter (born 1932)
- April 9 – Patti Astor, underground actress and gallerist (born 1950)
- April 13 – Trina Robbins, American cartoonist (born 1938)
- April 13 – Faith Ringgold, American painter, author, mixed media sculptor, performance artist (born 1930)
- April 16 – Jean-Marie Haessle, French painter (born 1939)
- April 25 – Au Ho-nien, Chinese painter (born 1935)
- April 28 – Zack Norman, actor and art collector (born 1940)

=== May ===
- May 4 – Frank Stella, American painter, sculptor, and printmaker (born 1936)
- May 17 – Roberta Marrero, Spanish artist (born 1972)
- May 23
  - Sir John Boardman – 96, English archeologist and art historian (born 1927)
  - Marc Camille Chaimowicz, French multi-disciplinary artist (born 1946)

=== June ===
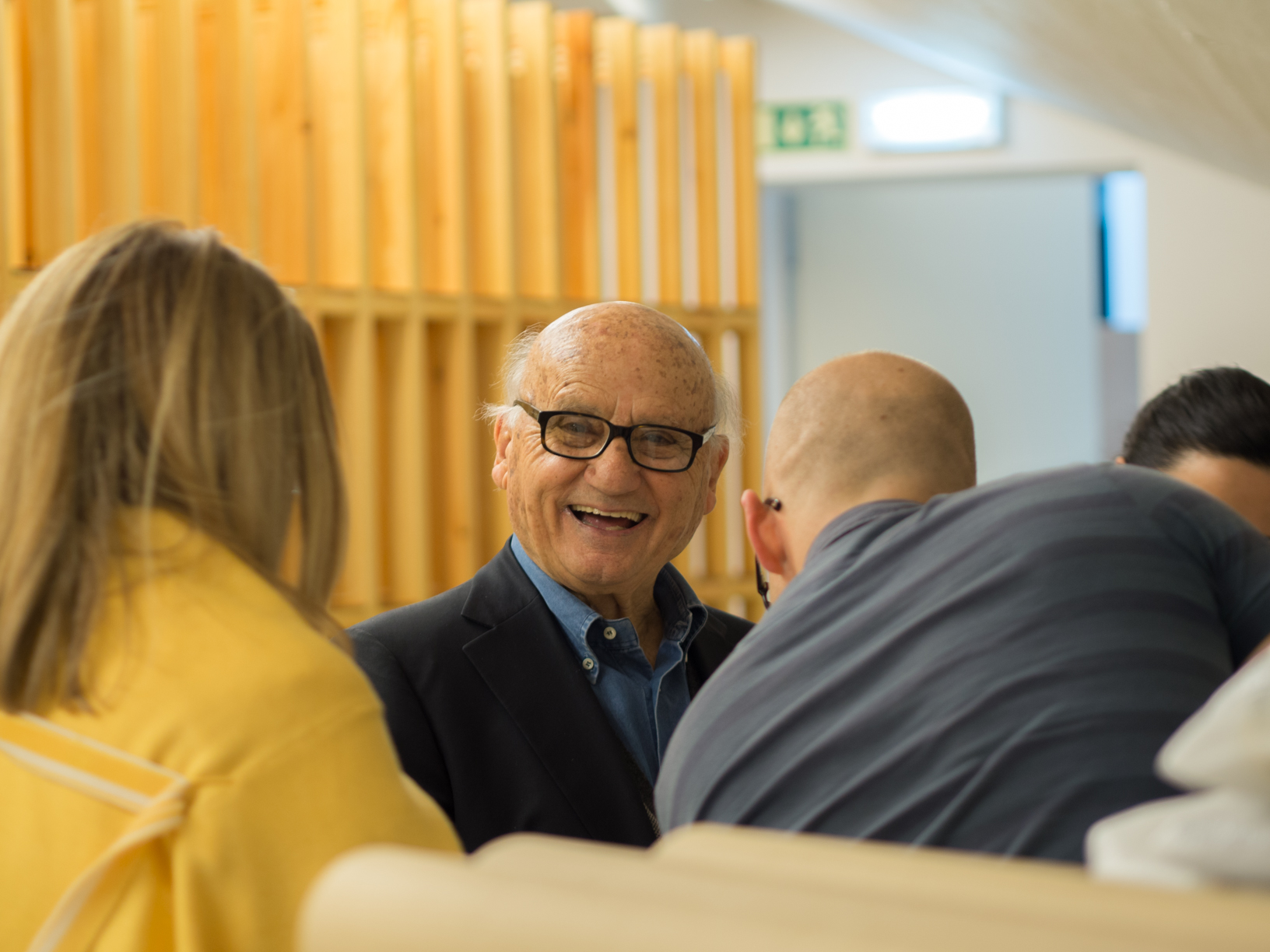
Manuel Cargaleiro in 2015

- June 5 – Ben Vautier (aka Ben), French visual artist (suicide; born 1935)
- June 29 – Jacqueline de Jong, Dutch painter, sculptor, and graphic artist (born 1939)
- June 30 – Manuel Cargaleiro, Portuguese ceramicist and painter (born 1927)

=== July ===
- July 1 – June Leaf, American visual artist (born 1929)
- July 4 – Dorothy Lichtenstein, President of the Roy Lichtenstein Foundation (born 1939)
- July 10 – Thomas Hoepker, German photographer (born 1936)
- July 12 – Bill Viola, American video artist (born 1951)
- July 17 – Farhad Moshiri, Iranian artist (born 1963)
- July 22 – Germaine Hoffmann, Luxembourgish painter and collage artist (born 1930)
- July 23 – Mark Mallia, Maltese painter and sculptor (born 1965)

=== August ===
- August 9 – Keiichi Tanaami, 88, Japanese pop artist
- August 10 – Kasper König, 80, German museum director and curator
- August 11 – Simon Verity, 79, British sculptor and stone carver (Cathedral of Saint John the Divine) (born 1945)
- August 14 – Godawari Dutta, 93, Indian Madhubani painter
- August 15 – Jaime Botín, 88, Spanish art collector and convicted smuggler (Head of a Young Woman by Pablo Picasso 1906)
- August 17 - Bill Beckley, 78, American narrative and conceptual artist (born 1946)
- August 21 – David Anfam, 69, British art writer (born 1955)
- August 27 – Leonard Riggio, 83, American art collector (Dia) (born 1941)
- August 29 – Ēvī Upeniece, 99, Latvian sculptor (born 1925)
- August 30 – Hans Danuser, 71, Swiss visual artist and photographer (born 1953)

=== September ===
- September 3 – Jacqueline Winsor, 82, Canadian-born American sculptor (born 1941) (death announced on this date)
- September 5 – Derek Boshier, 87, English Pop artist (born 1937)
- September 6 – Rebecca Horn, 80, German visual artist and film director (Buster's Bedroom) (born 1944)
- September 11 – Peter Klashorst, 67, Dutch painter, sculptor, and photographer (born 1957)
- September 14
  - Fred Nall Hollis, 76, American visual artist (born 1948)
  - James Magee, 79, American visual artist (The Hill of James Magee) (born 1945)
- September 16 – Norman Ackroyd, 86, English visual artist (born 1938)
- September 16 – Eikoh Hosoe, 91, Japanese photographer
- September 20 – Valentinas Antanavičius, 88, Lithuanian painter (born 1936)
- September 22 – Ivan Vukadinov, 92, Bulgarian painter (born 1932) (death announced on this date)
- September 26 – Richard Mayhew, 100, American painter, illustrator, and arts educator (born 1924)

=== October ===
- October 12 – Lillian Schwartz, 97, American artist (born 1927)
- October 15 – Andrew Stahl, 69 or 70, British painter (born 1954) (death announced on this date)
- October 16 – Patricia Johanson, 84, American environmental artist.
- October 18 – Isabelle de Borchgrave, 78, Belgian sculptor and painter (born 1946) (death announced on this date)
- October 23 – Robert C. Morgan, 81, American art critic and visual artist (born 1943)
- October 24 – Gary Indiana, 74, American art critic (The Village Voice) (born 1950) (death announced on this date)
- October 28 – Paul Morrissey, 86, American film director (cinematic collaborator of Andy Warhol) (born 1938)
- October 30 – Elisabeth Ohlson Wallin, 63, Swedish photographer and artist (Ecce Homo), stomach cancer (born 1961)

=== November ===
- November 6 – Daniel Spoerri, 94, Swiss visual artist and writer (born 1930)
- November 11
  - Frank Auerbach, 93, German-British painter (born 1931)
  - Walter Dahn, 70, German painter, photographer, and sound artist (born 1954)
- November 15 – Tom Forrestall, 88, Canadian painter (born 1936)
- November 16 – Eunice Parsons, 108, American artist (born 1916)
- November 19 – Vojo Stanić, 100, Montenegrin painter and sculptor (born 1924)
- November 23 – Cynthia Zukas, 93, South African-born Zambian painter (born 1931)
- November 24 – Breyten Breytenbach, 85, South African painter (born 1939)
- November 29 – Rafig Nasirov, 77, Azerbaijani sculptor (born 1947)

=== December ===
- December 10 - Raghnall Ó Floinn, Irish art historian, director of the National Museum of Ireland (2013–2018).
- December 13 - Lorraine O'Grady, 90, American artist (born 1934)
- December 15
  - Juan Cárdenas Arroyo, 85, Colombian painter (born 1939)
  - Jodhaiya Bai Baiga, 86, Indian visual artist (born 1938)
  - Rezki Zerarti, 86, Algerian painter (born 1938)
- December 16 - Yoshio Taniguchi, 87, Japanese architect (MoMA) (born 1937)
- December 17 - Roberto Esteban Chavez, 92, American artist (born 1932)
- December 18 - Zilia Sánchez Domínguez, 96, Cuban-born Puerto Rican visual artist (born 1928)
- December 20 - Kurt Laurenz Metzler, 83, Swiss sculptor (born 1941)
- December 24 - Alfredo Prior, 72, Argentine painter (born 1952)
- December 29 - Marie-Claude Beaud, 78, French art exhibition curator (born 1946) (death announced on this date)
