= List of public art in Rutland =

This is a list of public art in Rutland, in England. This list applies only to works of public art accessible in an outdoor public space. For example, this does not include any artworks in a museum or private collection.

== Empingham ==
Image	Title / subject	Location and coordinates	Date	Artist / designer	Type	Material	Dimensions	Designation	Wikidata	Notes
	The Great Tower	Sykes Lane, near the Rutland Water visitor centre 52.662557°N 0.617921°W	1980	Alexander	Sculpture	Bronze	Height 10 metres	—		

== Oakham ==
Image	Title / subject	Location and coordinates	Date	Artist / designer	Type	Material	Dimensions	Designation	Wikidata	Notes
	Statue of Elizabeth II	Catmos Street 52.669087°N 0.725402°W	2024	Hywel Pratley	Statue on pedestal	Bronze and stone	Height 2.1 metres	—	Q125821527	
