= Marhia Temple =

Marhia Temple, also known as Vamana Temple, Deori is a temple located in Jabalpur district. It is situated on the banks of the Ken river.

== History ==
The temple is ascribed to the Gupta period.

In an 1884 report, Alexander Cunningham notes the presence of a small ruined temple, which might have been the Marhia temple. In 1968, historian Pramod Chandra along with his team surveyed the site. He noted that the temple was in a dilapidated state, and was in danger of collapse. In 2025, it was added to the tentative list for the UNESCO World Heritage Sites.

== Description ==
The temple faces west, and is situated upon a square platform about four feet high. It accessible by a flight of five steps on its western side. It consists of a square garbagriha (sanctum), with each side measuring 3.82 meters. The walls are constructed using ashlar masonry, with each wall built out of two rows of stones.

The entrance to the sanctum is located on the western side, and built out of sandstone. The doorway measures 1.95 × 1.46 meters, and has two sakhas (bands of decoration). The inner band contains lotus and conch motifs. Two dvarapalas (door guardians) flank the base of the entrance, each accompanied by an attendant. The lintel contains an image of Vishnu in his four-armed form, riding atop his eagle mount Garuda, whose wings form a crescent. Vishnu's four arms and face, as well as Garuda's face, have suffered damage.

A balustrade of stones with rounded caps, runs around the roof. The square sanctum is crowned by a pyramidal superstructure. Pramod Chandra considers this to be an intermediate step in the development of the shikhara (temple tower).

An idol of Vamana, dressed in a dhoti has been found outside the temple, and it is considered to be the principal deity. The idol, still in its socle, is accompanied by a makara crocodile.
