= Dawu Yu =

Yu Dawu (Chinese: 于大武; pinyin: Yú Dàwǔ; born: 1948) is a Chinese artist, picture book writer, and a member of the China Artists Association.

== Biography ==
Yu was born in 1948 in Beijing. He graduated from the Central Academy of Fine Arts in 1986. He started working as an art editor and an artist at the People's Fine Arts Publishing House in 1978, before he attended the Central Academy of Fine Arts in Beijing. Yu serves as a reviewer at the China Fine Arts Publishing Group. He is a member of the China Artists Association and a member of the Beijing Artists Association.

== Awards and Commendations ==
- Ne Zha (哪吒闹海), Noma Concours for Picture Book Illustrations of the Asia/Pacific Cultural Centre, UNESCO in 1989, Kodansha Publication Culture Award in 1991. The artwork was included in the Complete Works of Modern Art in China (1997).
- Journey to the West (西游记), Sankei Shimbun Prize for Painting (1994).
- Dragon Heads Up (龙抬头), presented at the Illustrator's Exhibition at the Bologna Children's Book Fair (2000).
- The artwork of One Hundred Thousand Arrows (十万支箭) was collected by the Chihiro Art Museum in Japan.

== Picture books ==
- Beijing: A Symmetrical City
- A Bicycle in Beijing (一辆自行车)
- The Spring in Beijing (北京的春节)
- Beijing: A Symmetrical City (北京：中轴线上的城市)
- One Hundred Thousand Arrows (十万支箭), Japan and Korea.
- Ne Zha (哪吒闹海)
