= Paula Bossio =

Australian illustrator and author

- Occupations: Author and illustrator
- Writing career
- Notable work: El Lápiz

Paula Bossio is an internationally recognized author and illustrator who lives in Melbourne, Australia.

Bossio studied graphic design in Colombia, and illustration at Barcelona's EINA school of art and design. She has worked as a freelance illustrator in publishing and advertising industries from 2000. Her board book, El Lápiz was published in English in 2016.

== English translations ==
- 2016 – The Pencil, 24pp., ISBN 978-1-776570-41-6

== International recognition ==
- 2002 – Noma Concours for Picture Book Illustrations, Runner Up Prize
- 2004 – Noma Concours for Picture Book Illustrations, Encouragement Prize
- 2009 – Katha Chitrakala, Runner Up Prize
- 2010 – A la Orilla del Viento, administered by the Fondo de Cultura Económica, Honorable Mention
