= A. Ramachandran Museum =

Art museum in Kollam, India

Coordinates: 8.8972°N 76.5885°E

The A. Ramachandran Museum is an art museum and memorial gallery located in Ashramam, Kollam district, Kerala, India. The museum has been set up inside the Sree Narayana Guru Cultural Complex, established in honor of Indian artist A. Ramachandran (1935–2024). Along with his paintings, the exhibits will feature his sculptures, ceramics, stamp designs, and children’s books. Less than two years after Ramachandran’s death in February 2024 at the age of 88, the museum was inaugurated by then Kerala Chief Minister Pinarayi Vijayan on October 5 at the Sree Narayana Guru Cultural Complex. The 7,000-square-foot museum has been curated to international standards by art expert Shivakumar.

Inside, visitors will find a collection of paintings, murals, and experimental works that span Ramachandran's six-decade long career. Ramachandran, known for his bold colours, figurative strength, and unique synthesis of Kerala’s folk idioms with global modernism, remains one of India’s most distinctive artistic voices. The collection, supported by the artist’s family, includes twelve oil paintings curated by the artist himself, three monumental lotus pond canvases measuring sixteen by six feet. Beyond the art, the museum displays Ramachandran’s collection of post-Ravi Varma portraits and Nathdwara miniatures, with his art library housed separately at the Lalithakala Akademi, Ernakulam. The logo of the museum, developed from Ramachandran’s painting Song of the Simbal Tree.
