= Alma College =

Private college in Alma, Michigan, US

- Type: Private liberal arts college
- Established: October 26, 1886; 139 years ago
- Accreditation: HLC
- Religious affiliation: Presbyterian
- Academic affiliations: Annapolis Group
- Endowment: US$121.6 million (2021)
- President: Joseph L. Odenwald
- Provost: Sean D. Burke
- Academic staff: 83 full-time, 51 part-time
- Undergraduates: 1,159
- Postgraduates: 38
- Location: Alma, Michigan, United States; 43.380°N 84.671°W
- Campus: Small city, rural area 125 acres (0.51 km^{2})
- Colors: (Maroon and cream)
- Nickname: Scots
- Sporting affiliations: NCAA Division III - MIAA
- Mascot: Scotty
- Website: alma.edu
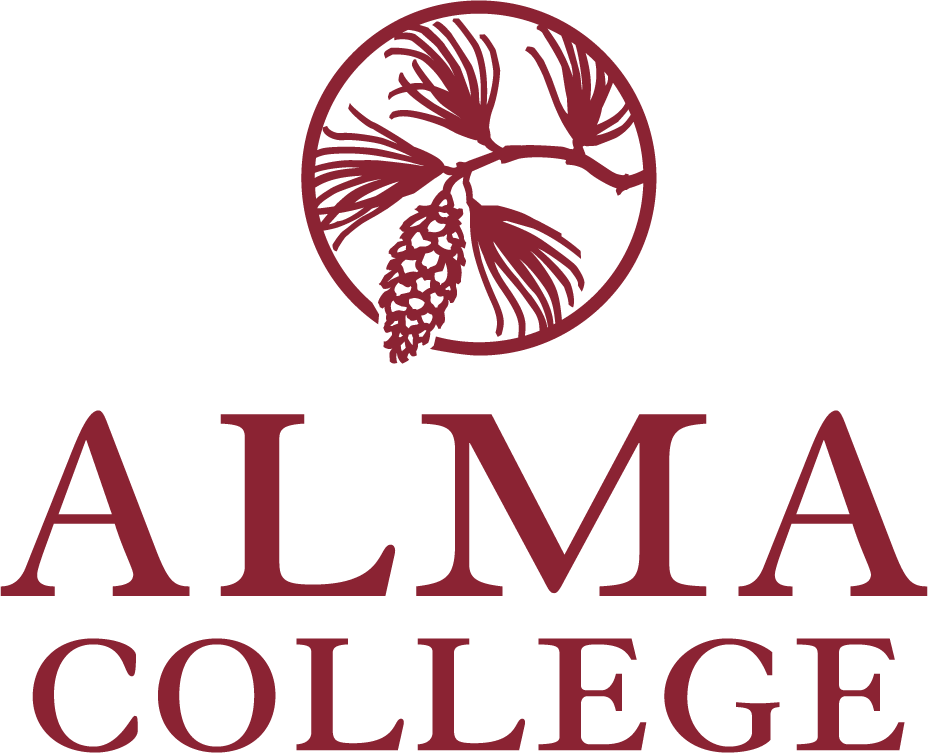

Alma College is a private liberal arts college in Alma, Michigan, United States. It enrolls approximately 1,200 students and is accredited by the Higher Learning Commission. Alma College is affiliated with the Presbyterian Church (USA) and offers bachelor's degrees in multiple disciplines as well as two master's degree programs. Its athletics teams, nicknamed the Scots, are part of the National Collegiate Athletic Association (NCAA) – Division III and the Michigan Intercollegiate Athletic Association (MIAA).

== History ==
The college was founded by Michigan Presbyterians in 1886. It received funding from lumber magnate Ammi W. Wright, for whom Wright Hall on campus and Wright Avenue in the city of Alma are named.

A marker designating the college as a Michigan Historic Site was erected by the Michigan History Division, Department of State. The inscription reads:

On October 26, 1886, the Presbyterian Synod of Michigan accepted an offer by Ammi W. Wright of Alma of thirty acres of land, containing two buildings, and a gift of $50,000 from Alexander Folsom of Bay City, for the purpose of establishing Alma College. The Synod had resolved: "We will, with God's help, establish and endow a college within our bounds." A charter was granted by the state of Michigan, April 15, 1887. Classes began September 12, 1887. In the first year there were 95 students and nine faculty members. Here the Presbyterian Church has fostered the pursuit of learning to the glory of God and to the dignity of men.

The college's 14th president, Joseph L. Odenwald, assumed office in June 2025.

=== Scottish heritage ===
In 1931, the college hosted a contest to replace their current mascot at the time, the Fighting Presbyterians, and "the Scots"—a nod to the Presbyterian Church's roots in Scotland—was chosen. Since that time, Alma College has embraced its Scottish traditions. While still maintaining a close relationship with the Presbyterian Church, Alma College accepts and welcomes students of all religious backgrounds.

== Academics ==
Admissions statistics
- 2024–1925 entering class
- Admit rate: 56.9 (2,958 out of 5,193)
- Yield rate: 9.63 (285 out of 2,958)

Alma College offers more than 45 undergraduate academic programs, and two graduate programs, leading to Bachelor of Arts, Bachelor of Fine Arts, Bachelor of Science, Bachelor of Music, Master of Fine Arts and Master of Arts. In addition to the academic majors, numerous concentrations, academic institutes, and special programs are offered, including the Honors Program and the Center for College and Community Engagement. Its most popular majors, in terms of 2024 graduates, were:

- Business (17.8 percent of graduates)
- Education (14.9 percent)
- Psychology (10.45 percent)

Along with its on-campus options, Alma College offers a number of domestic off-campus and internship programs, in cities including Chicago, New York City, Philadelphia and Washington DC. Alma offers international study programs in countries including Argentina, Australia, Ecuador, England, France, Germany, Ghana, Greece, Ireland, Italy, New Zealand, Peru, Scotland and Spain.

Alma has a 4-4-1 academic calendar, with 14-week terms in the fall and winter, and a four-week term in May. Students typically use the latter term, known on-campus as Spring Term, for travel, classes, research and internships.

Alma has had 31 Fulbright scholarship winners in its history. Its Model UN team is considered one of the best in the world; having received at least one "outstanding delegation" recognition at the National Model UN Conference for 28 consecutive years, and a total of 58 "outstanding delegation" awards.

=== Graduate degrees ===
Alma College in 2021 launched the first graduate program in its then-134-year history with the Master of Fine Arts in Creative Writing degree, led by author and educator Sophfronia Scott. In 2023, the college launched a Master of Arts in Special Education with Learning Disabilities Endorsement program.

== Campus ==
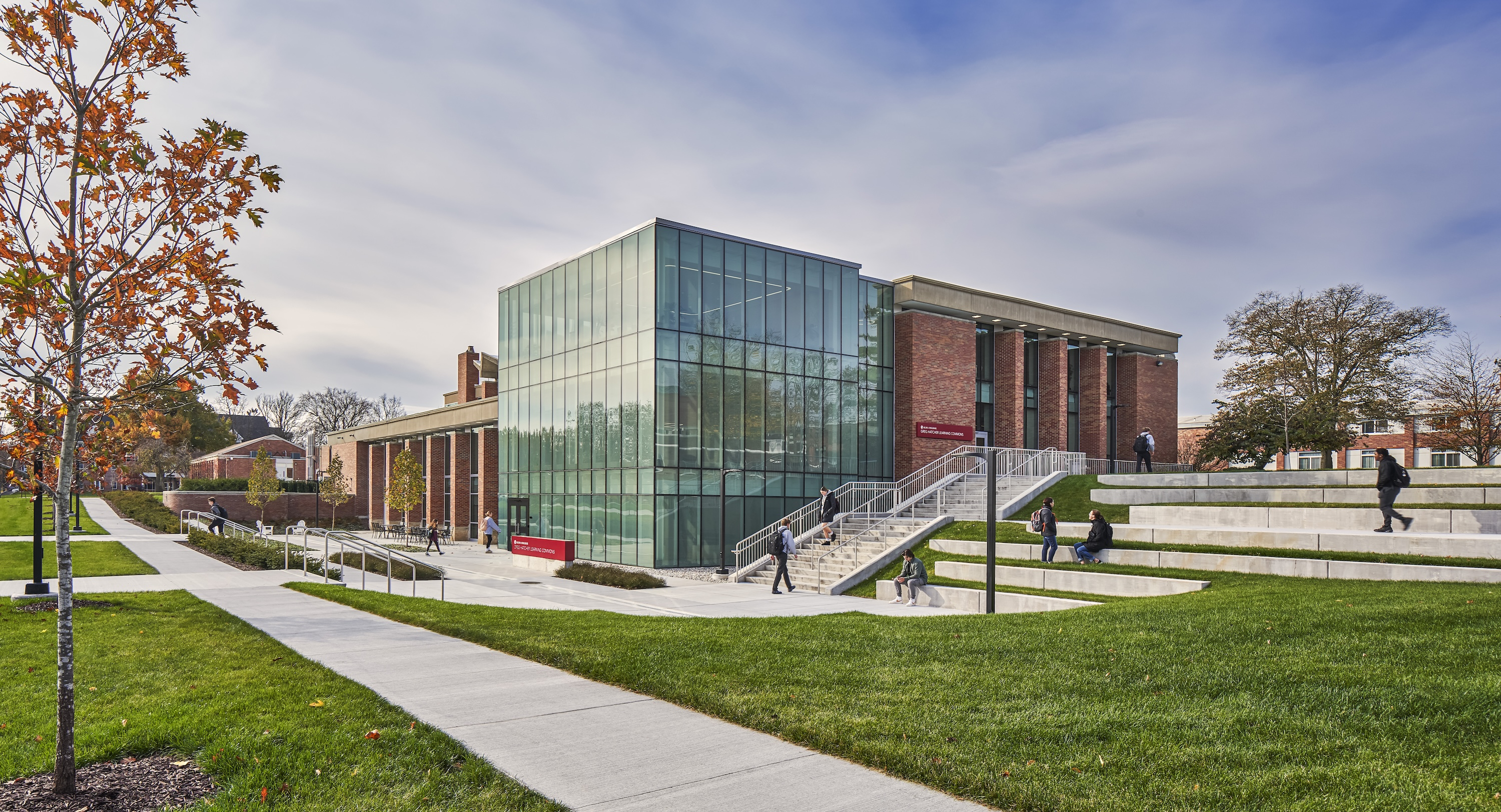
Greg Hatcher Learning Commons

Alma College is in a small-town setting, the city of Alma having slightly fewer than 10,000 residents. Its primary academic buildings, built with a red brick motif, are centered around a large square, McIntyre Mall. West of this mall is picturesque Thomas Andison Chapel.

The majority of buildings are located on North Campus, that is, the area north of Superior Street. These include the major dormitory residences, as well as the academic and student life buildings. South Campus is home to suite-style residences ("New Dorms," so named because they were built later in the 1960s than residences in North Campus) as well as the new environmentally friendly apartment-style Wright Hall, inaugurated in 2005 and the second residence of its name, the former being demolished in 1976. South Campus is also home to "Fraternity Row" (Center Street) and "Sorority Row" (Superior Street) as well as several other themed houses. More than half of the buildings on Alma's campus were built under the long tenure (1956–1980) of Robert D. Swanson, after whom the main academic building is named.

The Dow Science Center, renovated in 2018, features the Gerstacker Science and Technology Suite, as well as the Dow Digital Science Center (DDSC). These spaces offer academic student study space, large screen monitors for showing remote projects in real time, dedicated computer work stations, a large conference room designed for distance room and a seminar room. The DDSC sponsors summer camps for elementary, middle and high school students in the area.

The college in 2019 dedicated the Wright Leppien Opera House Block, a historic structure in downtown Alma which had been gutted by a fire almost a decade earlier. "The Opera House," as it is locally known, was historically considered to be the main local venue for numerous theatrical productions, concerts and public lectures. Today, it is used for student housing and special events.

The college in 2023 opened the Greg Hatcher Learning Commons, a $14-million renovation of its preexisting library into a new facility, which serves as both a library and a student union.

The Heritage Center for the Performing Arts is a performing arts venue located on the campus of Alma College in Alma, Michigan. Originally completed in 1993, the facility serves as a center for theatrical performances, musical productions, lectures, and community events. It supports the college's academic programs in the performing arts while also hosting cultural events for the surrounding region. The building includes a proscenium theater, rehearsal and support spaces, dressing rooms, classrooms, and public gathering areas designed to accommodate a range of performances and educational activities. The center has become an important venue for both campus and community arts programming. Originally named by its donor Heritage Center for the Performing Arts it was later renamed Oscar E. Remick Heritage Center for the Performing Arts The facility was designed by Cordogan Clark & Associates Architects/Engineers, whose work emphasized creating a flexible performance environment while respecting the scale and character of the Alma College campus. The design balances technical performance requirements—including acoustics, stage support systems, audience sightlines, and accessibility—with welcoming public spaces intended to encourage community engagement. Since its opening, the Heritage Center has hosted student productions, concerts, guest artists, lectures, and regional cultural events, contributing to Alma College's longstanding commitment to the performing arts and liberal arts education.

In addition to the main campus, the college also owns a 180-acre (0.73 km^{2}) ecological research area containing woodlands, a willow marsh, a sphagnum bog, and a glacial kettle lake, with a full research facility and a bird observatory, located in Vestaburg, about 15 miles (24 km) west of Alma.

== Athletics ==
Alma Scots logo

Alma athletics teams are nicknamed the Scots. In December 2021, the college announced the addition of women's wrestling bringing the total number of sports offered up to 12 men's NCAA and 12 women's NCAA, plus co-ed esports and women's bowling, competitive cheer, dance, and STUNT. Alma is a member of the Michigan Intercollegiate Athletic Association, the oldest college athletic conference in the United States.

The mascot of Alma College is Scotty. He wears a traditional highland Kilt, sporran, and sash woven in the Alma College tartan pattern.

The Andrus Family Field House opened in 2025; the 78,080-square-foot facility includes an indoor track and turf field for the purposes of soccer, baseball, softball lacrosse and track and field.

=== Honors ===
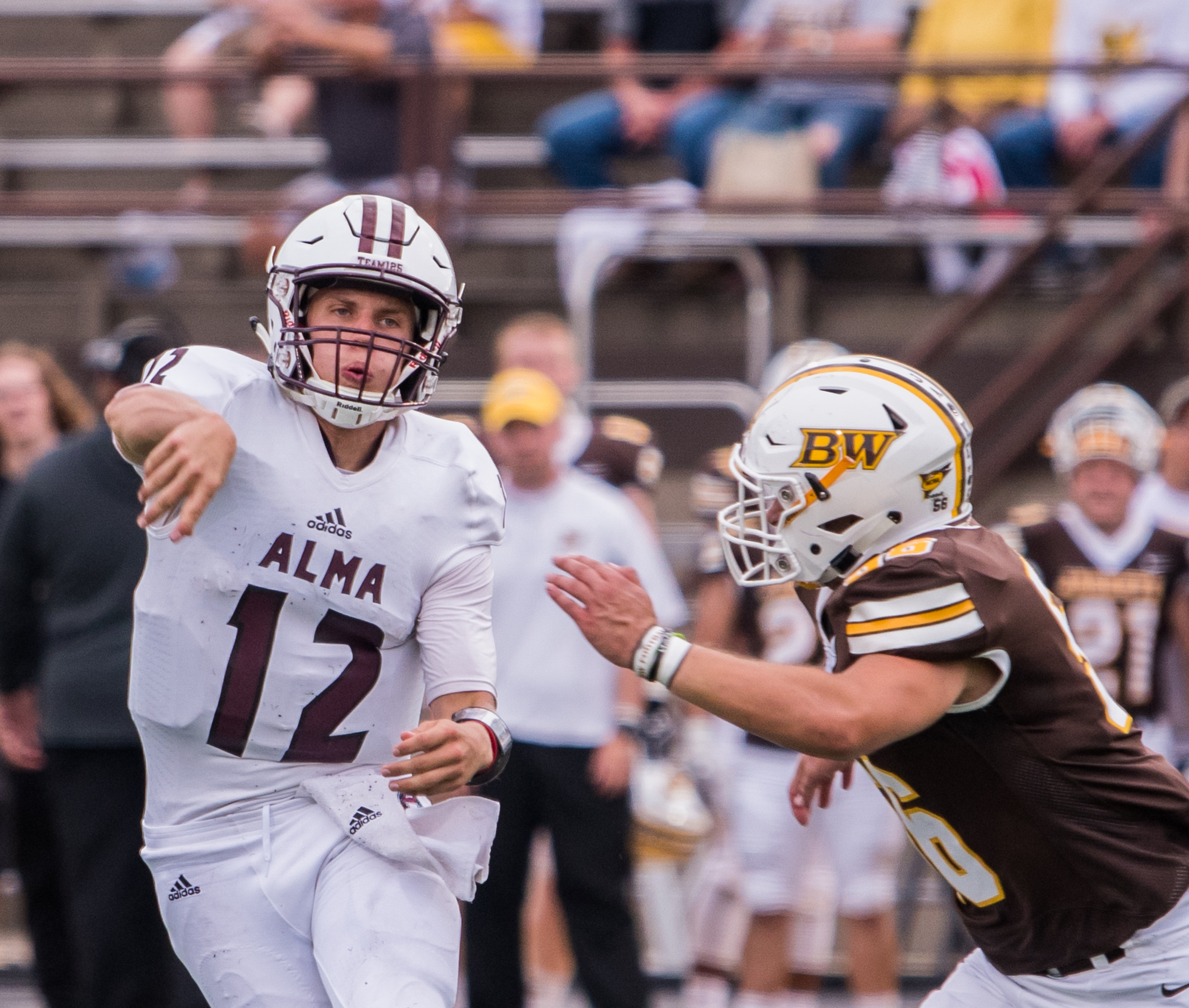
Alma Scots football game against Baldwin Wallace

- In 1992, Alma's women's basketball team earned the NCAA Division III championship.
- In 2006, Alma College quarterback Josh Brehm was named the recipient of the Gagliardi Trophy, the highest individual honor in NCAA Division III football.
- In 2022, Alma's dance team won its seventh National Dance Alliance (NDA) Division 3 championship.
- In 2023, Alma's football team reached the third round of the NCAA Division III tournament for the first time in its history.
- In 2024, Alma's competitive cheer team won a fourth-consecutive National Cheerleaders Association (NCA) Division 3 championship.

== Notable alumni ==
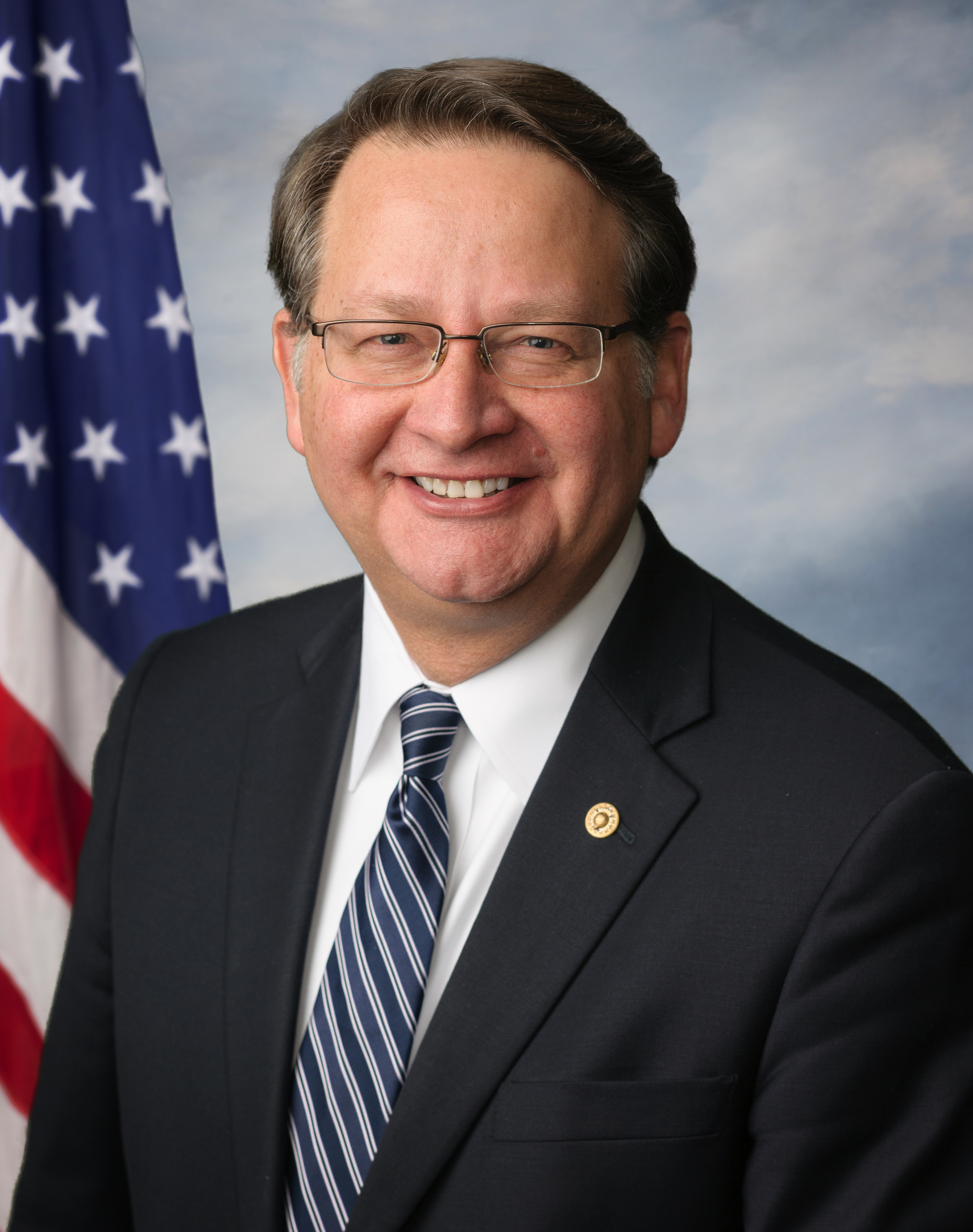
Gary Peters

- George Allen (1918–1990), NFL coach inducted in Pro Football Hall of Fame
- Jake Boss (born 1971), NCAA Baseball player and coach, head coach at Michigan State University
- Bob Bruce (1933–2017), Major League Baseball pitcher from 1959 to 1967
- Paul Hale Bruske (1877–1956), writer, journalist, advertising executive, and sportsman
- William Skinner Cooper (1884–1978), botanist and ecologist; former president of the Ecological Society of America and the Minnesota Academy of Science
- Jim Daniels (born 1956), poet and writer
- Bob Devaney (1915–1997), football player and Nebraska coach inducted in College Football Hall of Fame
- Gary Dorrien (born 1952), social ethicist and theologian
- Paul Ganus, (born, 1961), actor
- James Magee (artist) (1945–2024), artist
- Brad Guigar (born 1969), cartoonist
- Jennifer Haase (born 1974), teacher and politician, served in Michigan State House of Representatives
- Frank Knox (1874–1944), newspaper editor and publisher; served as Secretary of the Navy and was a one-time Republican Party vice-presidential candidate
- Betty Mahmoody (born 1945), writer and activist, author of Not Without My Daughter (1987), adapted as 1991 film of the same name
- Jim Northrup (1939–2011), MLB player, Detroit Tigers
- Gary Peters (born 1958), politician, currently member United States Senate (D-MI)
- Dan Scripps, former politician and president of the Michigan Energy Innovation Business Council
- Lester W. Sharp (1887–1961), botanist and pioneer in cytogenetics
- Tom Shaw (1945–2014, SSJE), Episcopal Bishop of Massachusetts
- Denny Stolz (born 1934), football player and coach
- Claude Watson (1885–1978), lawyer, businessman, and minister; temperance movement leader and two-time Prohibition Party presidential candidate
