= Oscar (dog) =

Famous travelling dog

- Species: Dog
- Breed: Mixed
- Sex: Male
- Born: Early 2004
- Died: 2013 (aged 8–9)
- Occupation: Dog adoption and sterilisation advocate
- Owner: Joanne Lefson

Oscar was a mixed-breed dog that was adopted from an animal shelter in Cape Town in 2004. DNA testing revealed him to have been a mix of Alsatian, Corgi, Cocker Spaniel, and Basset Hound. He is best known for having travelled around the world with his owner Joanne Lefson in 2009. The pair travelled across five continents and visited over 30 countries to promote dog adoption and sterilisation on a trip that was dubbed the World Woof Tour.

When Oscar died in 2013, Lefson established the Oscar's Arc Trust in his honor. The Oscar's Arc Trust is a South African public benefit organisation that has adopted and saved the lives of thousands of shelter dogs.

== Early life ==
Oscar was born sometime in the early part of 2004. The exact date and location of his birth are not known. In April 2004, Lefson adopted him from the Grassy Park SPCA in Cape Town, South Africa, one day before he was due to be euthanised. Forming a strong bond with Oscar, Lefson felt inspired to change the negative public perception of shelter dogs and decided to embark on a world tour with Oscar to inspire dog adoption.

== World Woof Tour ==
On 2 May 2009, Lefson and Oscar set off on a global expedition that became known as the World Woof Tour. According to Lefson, the aim of the World Woof Tour was to create much-needed publicity for underfunded shelters in countries like India and China. Together, Oscar and Lefson travelled 250,000 km, and visited sites such as the Great Wall of China, Machu Picchu, the Statue of Liberty, the Grand Canyon, the Eiffel Tower, the Egyptian pyramids, Red Square in Moscow, and the Trevi Fountain in Rome. Oscar and Lefson also were married in Las Vegas by an Elvis impersonator.

At each destination on the tour, Oscar participated in local events to bring attention to the plight of stray dogs. For example, in France, Oscar and Lefson worked in collaboration with the Brigitte Bardot Foundation to fill an open-top bus with rescue dogs and their owners. The bus then drove around Paris, stopping so that the owners could share stories of their adoptions with passers-by. Similarly, when the pair visited Romania, they helped promote a four-day spay-a-thon.

Oscar and Lefson returned to Cape Town in December 2009, eight months after they had departed for the tour. Oscar is the only documented dog to have ever travelled around the world and his travels made him the global ambassador for shelter dogs.

== Pedigree around South Africa tour ==
In 2010, Oscar and Lefson embarked on a South African tour, sharing the stories of their global travels with schools and shelters across South Africa to help spread awareness about dog shelters and dog adoption.

== Oscar Maximus ==
In April 2012, Oscar and Lefson travelled in a 40-meter-tall, 260 kg, propane gas-powered dog-shaped hot air balloon, nicknamed 'Oscar Maximus' as part of the Pedigree Dog Adoption Tour. The balloon took off from Pretoria on April 14 and travelled to eight South African cities, encouraging people to first consider adopting a dog before purchasing one and encouraging dog owners to sterilize their pets.

== Legacy ==
Lefson accidentally ran over Oscar in 2013. His injuries were fatal and following his death Lefson adopted a street dog from the Northern town of Ladakh in India whom she named 'Rupee'. Later that same year, Lefson took Rupee to Kathmandu, Nepal, and travelled with him to the base camp of Mount Everest, 17,598 feet above sea level. Rupee and Lefson appeared on leading news channels following this accomplishment, including CNN, ABC news, NBC, and Carte Blanche. Lefson later returned to South Africa with Rupee, and the pair now reside in Cape Town. The journey up to Base Camp had been one that Lefson originally planned to do with Oscar before he died. Rupee is allegedly the first dog to have made the trip up to the base camp, although this claim has been disputed. She nicknamed the trip 'Expedition Mutt Everest'.

== Media appearances ==
Oscar was featured on numerous media outlets in recognition of his extensive travels. These included a live appearance on Good Morning America (2012). and Carte Blanche (in 2009 and 2010). He has also appeared in notable print media such as the Telegraph, VISI and the South African Sunday Times.

== Joanne Lefson ==
Lefson was a former pro-golfer who dated American singer-songwriter John Denver between 1996 and 1997, until he died in a plane crash in Monterey Bay near Pacific Grove in California on October 12, 1997.

== Book ==
- Lefson, J. (2010). Ahound the World: My Travels with Oscar. Penguin Random House South Africa. ISBN 978-1-77022-108-6.

== See also ==
- Pigcasso, rescued in May 2016 by Joanne Lefson
