= Germaine Hoffmann =

Luxembourgish painter (1930–2024)

- Born: Germaine Schmit; 28 April 1930; Ospern, Luxembourg
- Died: 22 July 2024 (aged 94); Luxembourg
- Known for: Painter, collage artist
- Spouse: Léopold Hoffmann (m. 1950; died 2008)
- Children: 2

Germaine Hoffmann-Schmit (28 April 1930 – 22 July 2024) was a Luxembourgish painter and collage artist.

== Life and work ==
Germaine Schmit married writer Léopold Hoffmann (1915–2008) in 1950. They were the parents of a daughter, who married actor André Jung, and director Frank Hoffmann. From 1968 to 1998, she took evening courses and summer academies in various artistic techniques, including at the Académie Européenne Libre des Beaux-Arts and the Lycée des Arts et Métiers.

Hoffmann-Schmit created paintings and collages in mixed media, in which she often incorporated torn newspapers. She was a member of the Cercle artistique de Luxembourg, and had participated in the artist association's salons since 1987. Solo exhibitions include those at Galerie Simoncini (1986, 1991), at Clervaux Castle (1988), and at Casino Luxembourg (2020) with the exhibition Die Zeit ist ein gieriger Hund. In 2008, Hoffmann was appointed a Knight of the Order of Merit of Adolf of Nassau.

Hoffmann died on 22 July 2024, at the age of 94.
