= Hoda Hadadi =

Iranian illustrator, author and poet (born 1977)

- هدی حدادی
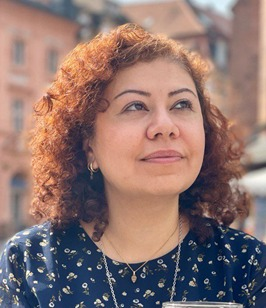
- Hadadi in 2024
- Born: February 2, 1977 (age 49); Tehran, Imperial State of Iran
- Education: University of Art
- Occupations: Illustrator, author, poet

Hoda Hadadi (Persian: هدی حدادی; born February 2, 1977) is an Iranian illustrator, author and poet. Her literary and visual works often support eco-feminism, featuring women as the narrators and heroes of their life stories. She delves into the lost narrators or forgotten narratives of women and their relationship with nature. She is particularly known for her collage technique in her visual artworks, especially her use of transparent silk paper.

== Biography ==
Hadadi was three years old at the start of the Islamic Revolution in Iran, and five when the Iran-Iraq War began, lasting for eight years. Her drawings during this period featured only girls, women, and nature, with no trace of war or ideology. At the age of ten, she began writing poems inspired by Ferdowsi's Shahnameh (The Book of Kings). Her professional career began at nineteen, while she was a graphic design student at Tehran University of Art, with publications in children's magazines. To date, many of her books have been published in Iran, the United States Denmark, and France.

== Articles and reviews about Hadadi ==
Some Recent Articles about Hoda

- 2023 A Comparative Study of the Human-Nature Relationship in The Fate of Fausto and I’ll Sow My Hands in the Garden
- 2021 “Reading Hoda Hadadi in Tehran” The Implicit Articulation of Lesbian Identity in Iranian Children’s Literature by Masih Zekavat/Johns Hopkins University press
- 2018. An Introduction to Ecofeminism: Alternative Ecofeminist Readings of Diling-a-DiLing and Two Friends/ Massih Zekavat, Europa-Universität Flensburg; Yazd University, Childhood Studies of Shiraz University /An Introduction to was published in Children’s Literature Studies in 2019

== Awards ==
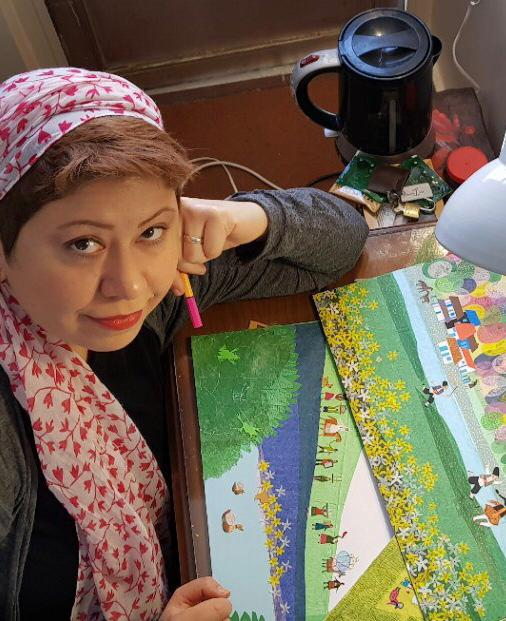
Hadadi illustrating

In 2018, Hadadi received five stars from the Danish newspaper Politiken for writing and illustrating the book "The Mountain That Wanted to Travel" (Bjerget der ville rejse).

- 2022 Honour certification of IBBY international (Board of books for young people) For the book: (Bacheha Bahar), Malaysia
- 2021 and 2020 The little Black Fish medal for Best Illustrator (The mother), Also (Bacheha Bahar), Children's Book Council (IBBY of Iran)
- 2020, selected for The white Raven list of the International Youth Library of Munich (I'll sow my hands in the garden) - Germany
- 2018, Gold Medal for Best Picture Book (Drummer Girl), International Book Award, USA
- 2017, Gold Medal for Best Illustrator (Drummer Girl), Literacy Classics Award, USA
- 2017, Gold Medal for Best Illustrator (Drummer Girl), Moonbeam Children's Book Awards, USA
- 2010, Winner of New Horizons of Bologna for Writing and Illustrating the book (Two Friends), Italy
- 2007, Grand Prix of Belgrade (Two Friends), Serbia
- 2007, Golden Plaque of BIB, Bratislava (If I Were a Pilot & With Rain Again), Slovakia
- 2005, Second Prize of Katha (Smiling Crocodile- Not published), India

== Bibliography ==
A complete list of Hoda Hadadi's books in which she has rolled as an Illustrator, Author, Poet or Art director, can be found here. Some notable books are as follows:

- Illustrator: Hoda Hadadi. Author: Rina singh. Garden of Grenades, Greystone books. Canada. 2023
- Illustrator: Hoda Hadadi. Author: Reem Farouqi. Milloo's mind. Harpercollins. USA. 2022
- Illustrator: Hoda Hadadi. Author: Raoul Follereau A smile. Pikku publishing. UK 2021 and in Canada by Pajama press. Canada 2021
- Illustrator: Hoda Hadadi. Author: Forough Farokhzad. I'll Sow my Hands in the Garden. Mirmah. Iran. 2019
- Illustrator: Hoda Hadadi. Author: Hoda Hadadi. Bjerget der ville rejse (The travelling mountain). Uro. Denmark 2018
- Illustrator: Hoda Hadadi. Poet: Hoda Hadadi. Jeg taenker pa et hjem (I Am Thinking of a Home). Uro. Denmark 2018
- Illustrator: Hoda Hadadi. Author: Nima Yushij. Bacheha Bahar. Mirmah. Iran 2018
- Illustrator: Hoda Hadadi. Author: Hiba Masoud. Drummer Girl. Daybreak. USA 2015
- Illustrator: Hoda Hadadi. Author: Kelly Cunnane. Deep in the Sahara. Random House. 2013. USA 2013, Also by Mitsumura. Japan 2014
- Author: Hoda Hadadi. The Clown (novel). Kanoon. 2012
- Illustrator and author: Hoda Hadadi Two Friends. Shabaviz. Iran 2007, Also in Italy 2010: Il bosco delle meraviglie,Terre editore, Also in France 2011. Amies pour la vie. Lirabelle publishing
- Illustrator: Hoda Hadadi. Author: Farhad Hasanzadeh. Kooti Kooti's Story (3 volumes). Kanoon. Iran 2006-2007-2008, Also by Mevsimler Kitap publishing, Turkey 2020
