= Alfredo Prior =

Argentine artist (1952–2024)

- Born: 1952; Buenos Aires, Argentina
- Died: 24 December 2024 (aged 72)
- Occupation: Painter

Alfredo Prior (1952 – 24 December 2024) was an Argentine painter, writer, performer, and musician. His career began at the age of 18 with his first solo exhibition in Buenos Aires, where he still lived and worked at the time of his death in late 2024.

== Influences and early work ==
Prior cited Argentine artist Juan Del Prete as one of his predecessors. He was also strongly influenced by themes from his university studies in oriental arts and literature.

Very early in his life, Prior bet on romantic and hallucinogenic painting. Whilst Jorge Romero Brest, the influential Buenos Aires art critic of the sixties and seventies, had declared the death of painting, Prior devoted eight years of work to mastering the medium.

After his first exhibition, in the Lirolay Gallery in 1970, where he presented 28 portraits of children made with tempera and wax, Prior began working on new abstract series, in which he used sheets of crumpled tracing paper as the supports. He outlined different geometries using synthetic enamel. The most successful example of these series is A la Manera de Aru Dutt ("In the style of Aru Dutt"), 1974.

After the seventies, Prior reappeared with a retrospective self anthology exhibition.

== Collaboration with other artists ==
In 1981 he presented a joint exhibition with Armando Rearte at Arte Múltiple Gallery, going on to form a collective with fellow artists Armando Rearte, Rafael Bueno, Guillermo Kuitca and Osvaldo Monzó. 1982 was a key year for the group, as they all participated in La Anavanguardia, a project curated by art critic Charlie Espartaco.

In 1983 Prior participated in La "Consagración de la Primavera", an exhibition curated by Laura Buccelato and Charlie Espartaco, at Espacio Giesso. Armando Rearte, Osvaldo Monzo, Guillermo Kuitca and Prior took part in the exhibition of paintings produced by the artists working together. This exhibition marked a change in direction for Prior, as he began working with different artists and groups than previously.

Prior took up residence in a basement at 959 Riobamba Street, a collective workshop, exhibition space and occasional cabaret, called "La Zona", where he would remain for three years. At the same time, Sergio Avello (born in 1964) and other artists of his generation grouped together and held several exhibitions at La Zona.

By 1984, after his third exhibition, Prior's personal canon, his private history of arts which ruled the political decisions of his imaginary, was already perfectly defined.

Prior was invited to exhibit at the 18th São Paulo Art Biennial, one of many exhibitions he took part in in 1985. The poet and critic Edward Lucie-Smith took interest in Prior's work during the Biennial and contacted him in Buenos Aires.

The installation that Guillermo Kuitca and Prior presented at Fundación San Telmo in 1985 marked the end of Prior's greatest spontaneous collaboration with other artists, and would be the last time they worked together.

A few months later Prior released the first of his Napoleonic sagas and the first chapters of his Chinese Encyclopedia, two-thirds of his monumental system of systems, almost simultaneously. He wanted from the very beginning, to reformulate historical painting choosing Napoleon for his condition of archetypical character and the popular representation of madness, a man characterized like Napoleon. He later established the relation Insane=Napoleon=Artist, for there is a deep rooted tradition about the image of the artist being very close to a dark zone.

== International exhibitions ==
In 1988 he exhibited at the Beau Lézard of Paris, at the Moderna Museum of Stockholm, at the Terne Gallery of New York during a tribute to Roland Barthes, and at the newly opened Iberoamerican Cooperation Institute (ICI).

From 1989 to 1992 he exhibited his works in New York City, São Paulo, Madrid, Mar del Plata (Argentina), Mexico City, Buenos Aires, Cali (Colombia), Rio de Janeiro, Nagoya (Japan), Medellín (Colombia), London and Ankara (Turkey).

In 1993, Prior proposed an exhibition simultaneously composed of eight heteronyms, judged by critics to be openly making fun of all traditional conceptualist and neo-conceptualist practices.

== Exhibitions ==
Prior's first solo exhibition at the Museo Nacional de Bellas Artes took place in 1998.

His solo presentations had been adapted to the space of each gallery and from this exhibition on, Prior let each museum interfere with his work. In this way, the public and validating space of the institution could become a support for his art, increasing the possibilities of his own resources. Starting at the Museo Nacional, he continued at the Museo Larreta. He would then exhibit in the Sala Cronopios of the Centro Cultural Recoleta and the Benito Quinquela Martín Gallery, in La Boca. He later held a retrospective at Museo Nacional de Arte Moderno.

In March 2003 he presented his most prestigious exhibition at the Buenos Aires Museum of Modern Art, featuring pieces from throughout his career: the Osarios series (1982/1984), works in collaboration with Kuitca, Rearte and Monzo (1983), Bears and Rabbits series (1986), Chinese Hairstyles and Scenes at a Chinese Restaurant from the Stone Age (both 1987), as well as Sweeping fallen leaves (1991), Aru Dut's Way (1974) and Complete Chinese Operas (1999).

In 2004, he reformulated all the paintings of Leonardo da Vinci for his second solo exhibition at the Museo Nacional de Bellas Artes. Prior improvised Da Vinci and chose the name "The War of Styles" for his "Davincian Orchestration", rebuilding the studies of the artist's lost fresco The Battle of Anghiari.

That same year he exhibited in Los Angeles with Kevin Power as curator. He has held annual solo exhibitions at his Buenos Aires gallery Vasari for the past years.

== Death ==
Born in 1952, Prior died on 24 December 2024, at the age of 72.

== Selected bibliography ==
- Cippolini, Rafael; Alfredo Prior. Buenos Aires: Vasari, 2007.
- Lopez, Anaya Jorge; Historia del Arte Argentino. Buenos Aires: Emecé, 1997.
