= A. Ramachandran =

Indian painter (1935–2024)

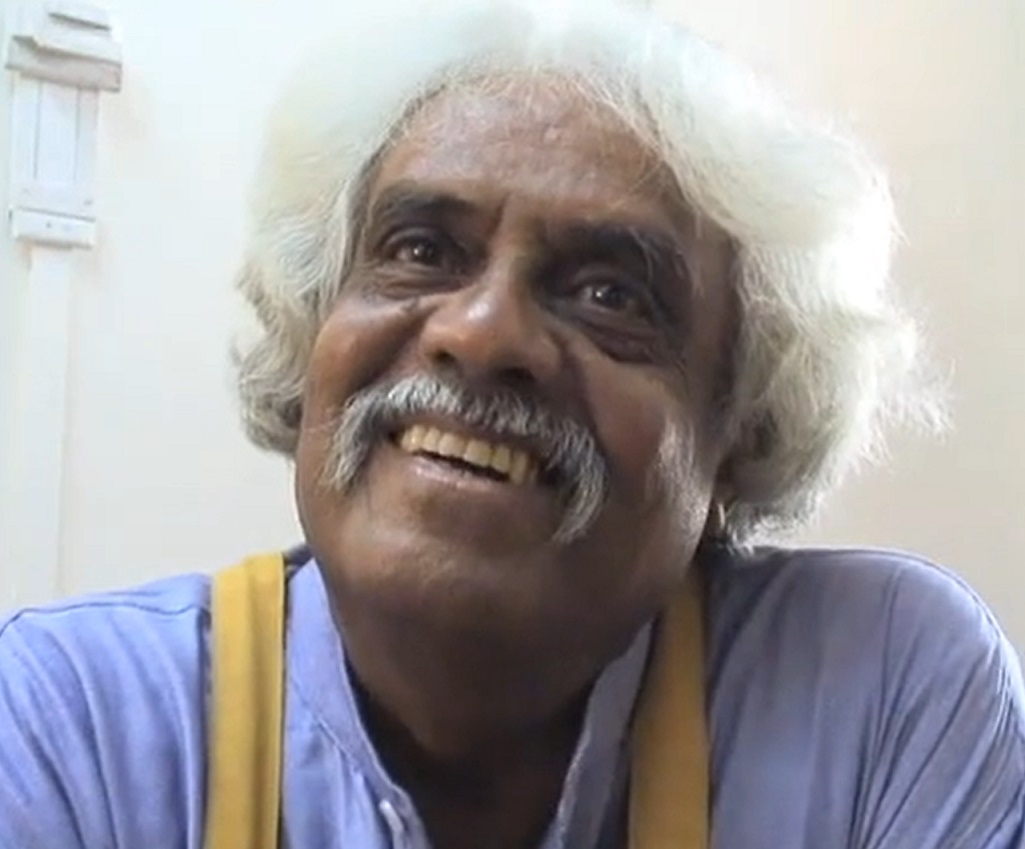
- Ramachandran in 2012

Honorary Chairman of Kerala Lalithakala Akademi
- In office 1991–?

Personal details
- Born: Achutan Ramachandran Nair; 1935 Attingal, Kingdom of Travancore, British India (now Kerala, India)
- Died: 10 February 2024 (aged 89) New Delhi, NCT of Delhi, India
- Citizenship: Indian
- Spouse: Tan Yuan Chameli
- Relations: Tan Yun-Shan (father-in-law)
- Education: MA (in Malayalam literature); PhD (in Kerala mural painting)
- Alma mater: Kala Bhavan
- Profession: Painter
- Awards: Padma Bhushan; Noma Concours (twice)

Achutan Ramachandran Nair (1935 – 10 February 2024) was an Indian painter. He was born in Attingal, Kerala. In 2002 he was elected a Fellow of the Lalit Kala Akademi, the national academy of fine arts. In 2005 he was awarded the Padma Bhushan, India's third highest civilian honour, for outstanding service to the nation. In 2013 he was conferred with an honorary doctorate by Mahatma Gandhi University, Kerala. By 2024 there had been at least thirty-two solo exhibitions of Ramachandran's paintings, sculptures, watercolours, graphics and drawings in major Indian cities. Outside India there have been exhibitions of his works held in Singapore, New York, London and Seoul.

== Career ==
In 1957 Ramachandran obtained his master's degree in Malayalam literature, but art had been his abiding interest since childhood. He joined Kala Bhavan, Santiniketan and completed his education in art in 1961, studying under Ramkinkar Baij and Benode Behari Mukherjee. Between 1961 and 1964 he worked on his doctoral thesis on Kerala mural painting. In 1964 he moved to Delhi, and joined the Kumar Gallery as an artist. In 1965 he started lecturing in art education at Jamia Millia Islamia. With Paramjit Singh and other colleagues he built up the institution into one that offered Bachelor's and Master's programs in Fine Arts. Later he became a professor in the department. He remained connected to the university until he took voluntary retirement in 1992 to devote more of his time to his artistic creations.

In 1991 Ramachandran was appointed honorary chairman of Kerala Lalithakala Akademi. In 1993 he and art historian Rupika Chawla mounted an exhibition at the National Museum in New Delhi as part of a critical reassessment of Raja Ravi Varma’s role in Indian art. It renewed interest in Ravi Varma’s work after an extended period of neglect and critical discredit. The exhibition was organised jointly by cultural and museum departments of the Government of India and the Government of Kerala. In 2008, with Sonia Rhie Mace and Pramod Chandra, Ramachandran co-organized the traveling exhibition "Rhythms of India: The Art of Nandalal Bose", originated and hosted by The San Diego Museum of Art in collaboration with the National Gallery of Modern Art, New Delhi, that was also staged at the Philadelphia Museum of Art before it toured India.

Ramachandran worked constantly and was prolific in a number of mediums, especially painting, sculpting and drawing. Initially Ramachandran painted in an expressionist style, showing brutalized, dehumanized figures that reflected the hardship and horrors of urban life. The paintings were large, akin to murals, and comprised powerful figuration. By the mid-1980s however, Ramachandran's work had undergone a sea-change. Urban reality was no longer a preoccupation. A tribal community in Rajasthan, with its vibrant ethos, gripped his imagination. Simultaneously, the colours and forms of the murals in the Kerala temples began to influence his modes of expression. Myths became a great resource for him. The first in this new style was Yayati (1986), a retelling of the story from the Indian epic, Mahabharata. It was conceived as the inner shrine of a Kerala temple, with thirteen bronze sculptures surrounded on three sides by painted murals.

In 2005 Ramachandran was awarded the Padma Bhushan.

In October 2025 the A. Ramachandran Museum was inaugurated at the Sree Narayana Guru Cultural Complex in Kollam, Kerala.

== Personal life and death ==
Ramachandran lived and worked in New Delhi. In 1967 he married artist Tan Yuan Chameli, daughter of Tan Yun-Shan. Their two children were raised and educated in New Delhi. Ramachandran was diagnosed with a tubercular infection of the right eye in 1984, and he experienced vision impairment for the rest of his career. Ramachandran died on 10 February 2024, at the age of 89.

== Work ==
In 1963 Ramachandran participated in a group showing in New Delhi. Subsequently he was offered a contract to work as an artist for the Kumar Gallery. In 1966 Ramachandran’s first solo exhibition was held there. From 1967 through 1970 there were four more solo exhibitions. During those and subsequent years his works were featured in numerous group exhibitions in India, and in some abroad. In 1969 he was commissioned to create a mural for the Gandhi Centenary. Later that year one of his paintings was included in the portfolio of Contemporary Paintings by eminent artists released by Lalit Kala Akademi. He participated in Triennale I (1968), II (1971) and III (1975). In 1972 he participated in the twenty-five years of Indian art exhibition. In 1969 and 1973 he received a National Award for painting from the Ministry of Culture, Government of India. In 1973 he illustrated This India by Sheila Dhar, published by the Government of India to celebrate the 25th anniversary of India’s independence. In 1975 and again in 1977 a one-man show of his works was held in New Delhi.

In 1977 Ramachandran was commissioned to do a mural and sculpture by the Maurya Sheraton Hotel, New Delhi. The resulting work was Vision of War. The mural was 12 by 5 feet, the sculpture (of Asoka) was 6 feet tall, bronze and zinc plates mounted on mirror. That year he participated in "Pictorial Space: A Point of View on Contemporary Indian Art" exhibition. In 1978 a retrospective exhibition showcasing thirteen years of his work in New Delhi was organised by the Kumar Gallery. In 1979 his works were featured in the Silver Jubilee Exhibition of Sculptures in New Delhi, as well as in exhibitions in Bombay, Madras and Calcutta. Ramachandran created a limited-edition portfolio of etchings inspired by the Urdu writings of Pakistani writer Saadat Hasan Manto, exhibited at the Prithvi Theatre, Mumbai.

In 1980 Ramachandran participated in the Silver Jubilee exhibition of miniature paintings in New Delhi, Bombay, Madras and Calcutta. In 1981 he created a series of miniature paintings in tempera on Japanese gold boards, and held "Puppet Theatre", an exhibition of paintings and drawings based on a novel by Anwar Sajjad, at the Dhoomimal Gallery in New Delhi. Also in 1981 he illustrated writings of Anwar Sajjad and other Urdu writers for a Shaoor publication. He participated in the "Indian Painting Today" exhibition in Mumbai and at "Asian Art" in Dhaka, Bangladesh.

Ramachandran designed six sets of commemorative stamps for the Department of Post and Telegraph of the Government of India. They marked the Silver Jubilee of the Bureau of Indian Standards (1972), the Indian Philatelic exhibition (1973), the centenary of the Universal Postal Union (1974), the fiftieth anniversary of Mahatma Gandhi’s Dandi March (1980), New Delhi's hosting of the Asian Games (1982), and the centenary of the discovery of the bacterium that causes tuberculosis (1982).

In 1982 Ramachandran participated in the "Contemporary Indian Art" exhibition in London, and the "India, Myth and Reality" show that followed. That year he created Modern Indian Painting for the exhibition that accompanied the visit of the Prime Minister of India to Washington DC. He participated in the inaugural exhibition of Bharat Bhavan, Bhopal, and in the "Indiche Kunst Heute" exhibition in Germany. In 1983 a retrospective exhibition of eighteen years of Ramachandran’s paintings, sculptures, drawings, miniatures and graphics was held at the Jehangir Art Gallery in Bombay. His works were featured in the "India in Print" show in Amsterdam, and in the "Asian Art" exhibition in Dhaka. In 1984 he created "Water Bodies", a set of eight ceramic pieces. From 1984-86 Ramachandran worked on Yayati, a three-panel mural (60 feet by 8 feet) with 13 bronze sculptures, a retelling of the story in the epic Mahabharata, that was exhibited at the Shridharani Gallery in New Delhi in 1986. In 2002 Yayati was exhibited again, at Art Heritage in New Delhi.

In 1985-87 Ramachandran participated in the International Festival of Arts in Cagnes-sur-Mer, France, the "Contemporary Indian Painting" exhibition at the Frankfurt Book Fair, the Havana Biennale in Cuba, and the Coup de Cœur exhibition in Geneva. In 1989 he participated in "Nature", an exhibition in New Delhi commemorating the birth centenary of Pandit Jawaharlal Nehru. In 1989-91 his works featured in the exhibitions "Art for Cry", "Art Mosaic" and "Award Winners of the National Exhibitions of Art, 1955-1990".

In 1991, "Urvashi, Pururavas and the Lotus Pond", an exhibition of Ramachandran's paintings, watercolours, drawings and sculptures, was held at the Shridharani Gallery, New Delhi. He participated in the "Masters" exhibition at Jehangir Art Gallery, Mumbai. Also that year he co-organized "From an Artist’s Collection", a selection of his 19th-century miniature paintings and drawings held at CMC Gallery in New Delhi. In 1993 he and Rupika Chawla co-organised the exhibition that reassessed Raja Ravi Varma's role in Indian art.

Also in 1993, Ramachandran participated in the "Wound" exhibition in New Delhi, Bombay and at the CIMA Gallery in Calcutta. In 1994 he participated in the exhibition "Review 1930-1993: From the NGMA Collection" at the National Gallery of Modern Art in New Delhi. In 1994 Ramachandran was commissioned by the Government of India to create the Rajiv Gandhi Memorial. In 1994-95 he participated in "Reality in Search of Myth", an exhibition held in Calcutta, Bangalore, Madras, Bombay and New Delhi. In 1995 he participated in the inaugural exhibition of the Art Today Gallery in New Delhi. In 1995 and 1999 his paintings were featured in the Christie’s exhibitions and auctions of Indian art in London.

In 1996 "The Mythical Traveller, Journeys into the Unknown" solo show of Ramachandran's works was held at the ARKS Gallery in London. That year he participated in the "Chamatkara: Myth and Magic in Indian Art" exhibition at Whitley’s Art Gallery in London, and in the "Contemporary Indian Painters, 1996" show in New Delhi and Mumbai.

In 1997, "The Lotus Pond at Obeshwar", an exhibition of Ramachandran paintings and watercolours, was held at Sistas’ Art Gallery in Bangalore. That year he participated in the "Colours of Independence" exhibition organised by CIMA in New Delhi and Calcutta; in the "Major Trends of Indian Art: 50th Anniversary of Indian Independence" exhibition in New Delhi; in the "Contemporary Indian Art: Rediscovering the Roots" exhibition presented by the Lalit Kala Akademi in Lima, Peru; in the "Indian Contemporary Art: Post-Independence" exhibition in New Delhi; and in the "Intuitive Logic" show organised by HEART in New Delhi and Bombay.

In 1998 the "Icons of the Raw Earth" exhibition of Ramachandran works was held in New Delhi (bronze sculptures and drawings at the Shridharani Gallery, paintings and watercolours at Art Today). A solo exhibition of his drawings and paintings in the medium of Chinese ink on rice paper was held at Gallerie Ganesha in New Delhi. In 1999 he participated in the "Watermark: The Watercolour Show" in Mumbai. In 2000 he participated in the "Celebration of Human Image" exhibition in New Delhi.

In 2001 "Imagined Territory", a solo show of Ramachandran's paintings, drawings, and sculptures, was held in New Delhi. In 2002, his Yayati murals and sculptures were exhibited at Art Heritage, sixteen years after their first showing.

In 2003, after almost a decade of effort, the immense Rajiv Gandhi Memorial in Sri Perumbudur, near Chennai, was completed. Ramachandran designed the bas-relief sculpture, which measures 125 feet by almost 20 feet, Subbaiah Sthapathy and his team of traditional artisans carved it. Also in 2003 Ramachandran's works were part of the "Celebration of Colour" exhibition in Mumbai and New Delhi, and he participated in the "Pictorial Transformations: Treasures from the Collection of the National Gallery of Modern Art" show in New Delhi. In 2003-04 the National Gallery of Modern Art held a retrospective of Ramachandran’s works in New Delhi.

In 2006 a major exhibition of Ramachandran’s paintings, drawings, watercolours and sculptures was held in Kolkata, and another solo show was held in New Delhi. In 2007 "Face to Face", an exhibition of his watercolours and oil head studies, was held at the Guild Gallery in New York. He participated in "From the Everyday to the Imagined: An Exhibition of Indian Art" in Singapore; in "Inverting/Inventing Traditions" in London; and in "Indian Art" II and III in London.

In 2008 a solo show of Ramachandran paintings, sculptures, watercolours and drawings was held at Grosvenor Vadehra Gallery, London. That same year an exhibit of his works was held in Mumbai, and he participated in "From the Everyday to the Imagined: An Exhibition of Indian Art" in Seoul, South Korea. With Pramod Chandra and Sonia Rhie Mace, he organized "Rhythms of India: The Art of Nandalal Bose" in San Diego, US. In 2009 "Bahurupi", a display of his works from 2005 to 2009, was held in New Delhi. In 2010 he participated in "The Modern Art of India: The Ethos of Modernity" in China. In 2013 Ramachandran participated in "Rewriting the Landscape: India and China", an exhibition of works by important artists from those countries held at the National Museum of Modern and Contemporary Art in Seoul, South Korea.

In 2014 a retrospective exhibition of about two thousand Ramachandran drawings, sketches and studies was held at Rabindra Bhavan, New Delhi. In 2016 the National Gallery of Modern Art in Bengaluru hosted a retrospective of his paintings, sculptures, watercolours, drawings and graphics. Also that year "Earthen Pot: Image Poems", a display featuring 21 coloured drawings, was held in New Delhi. In 2017-18 Ramachandran’s painting Homage to the Setting Sun was displayed in the Indian department of the Cleveland Museum of Art, alongside classical Indian sculptures. In 2018 "Changing Moods of the Lotus Pond and Insignificant Incarnations", a two-part exhibition of his recent works, was held in New Delhi.

In 2019 "Mahatma and the Lotus Pond", an exhibition of Ramachandran’s paintings, sculptures, watercolours and drawings, was held in Kochi. That year a retrospective of his fifty years of art creations was exhibited at the National Gallery of Modern Art in Mumbai. In 2021 two shows of his drawings, "A Lifetime of Lines" and "Gandhi: Loneliness of the Great", and a two-part exhibition of recent oil paintings, "Subaltern Nayika and the Lotus Pond", were held in New Delhi. In 2022 "Songs of Reclamation: The Art of A. Ramachandran", an exhibition featuring works in different mediums and scales, took place in Kolkata. In 2023 "A. Ramachandran: A Retrospective of Sculptures", was held in New Delhi.

As of 2024 there had been at least thirty-two solo exhibitions of Ramachandran's paintings, sculptures, watercolours, graphics and drawings in major Indian cities, most frequently New Delhi, Kolkata, Mumbai, Chennai, Bhopal and Bangalore. Outside India there have been exhibitions of his works held in Singapore (2007), New York (2007), London (2008 and 2026), and Seoul (2008 and 2013). In addition his works have been featured with other Indian artists' in exhibitions in the United States, Japan, Brazil, Venezuela, Canada, France, Bulgaria, Poland, Yugoslavia, Germany, Bangladesh, England, the Netherlands, Cuba, Switzerland, China, Australia and Peru.

== Children's Books ==
Ramachandran, often in collaboration with his wife, the artist Chameli, wrote and illustrated approximately fifty picture books for children. In addition to his own books he illustrated the works of others that were published in Japan, Britain and the United States. Under UNESCO auspices he visited Bangladesh (1983), South Korea (1988) and Papua New Guinea (1996) to promote and advance children's picture books. He received the Noma Concours Award in 1978 and 1980.

Children's books written and illustrated by Ramachandran were particularly well received in Japan. He visited Japan a number of times between 1972 and 1992 as a guest of publishers. In 1986 he was a keynote speaker at international conferences in Tokyo and Ōita on books for young people. Some original illustrations from his books are on permanent display at the Museum of Children's Books in Miyazaki, Japan.

In 1972 six children’s picture books written and illustrated by Ramachandran and his wife, Chameli, were published by Thomson Press, India. In 1973 Fukuinkan Shoten of Japan published Hanuman, written and illustrated by Ramachandran. In 1975 Ramachandran visited that country at the invitation of the Japan Foundation and met a number of renowned artists and illustrators of children’s books. Later that year Song of Circles, written and illustrated by Ramachandran and translated by poet Shuntaro Tanikawa, was published.

In 1983, with Chameli, he wrote and illustrated Jivya and the Tiger God. It was published by Fukutake Shoten, Japan, with artist Devraj Dakoji helping to prepare the illustrations using the intaglio etching process. Ramachandran illustrated Hitopadesha, translated by Francis G. Hutchins, published in 1985 by Amartya Press, USA. Ramachandran illustrated Planet Surprise, written by Shinji Tajima, published in Japan in 1988.

In 1989 Ramachandran's Land of Romol, originally published in Japan in 1976, was re-published by Mantra Publishing in London as The Flute in the Himalayas. It was printed in six languages: Bengali, English, Gujarati, Hindi, Punjabi and Urdu. In 1992 it was re-released in Japan as a CD by the Labo Teaching Information Centre, in collaboration with Fukuinkan Shoten publishers. An exhibition of the work's original illustrations was held in Tokyo and Hiroshima.

In 1992 Ramachandran wrote and illustrated The Golden City, published by Sanyu-Sha, Japan. In 2005 Gaudi’s Ocean: The Story of a Great Sea Turtle, written by Shinji Tajima and illustrated by Ramachandran, was published by Dindigul Bell, Japan. In 2007 Ten Woodcutters, written and illustrated by Ramachandran in 1979, was published by Kodansha Publishers, Japan. It received the Japanese Government Award for Welfare and Culture for Children. That year and again in 2009 an exhibition of original illustrations of Ramachandran's picture books was held at the Kizo Museum in Miyazaki, Japan.

== Publications ==
In 2003, the National Gallery of Modern Art in New Delhi organized a major exhibition of Ramachandran's work. A comprehensive two-volume book A. Ramachandran: A Retrospective, by R. Siva Kumar, documenting and analyzing the works, was released simultaneously.

In 2014 a retrospective of Ramachandran's drawings, sketches and studies was held at Rabindra Bhavan, New Delhi. Accompanying the event, a two-volume book, A. Ramachandran: Life and Art in Lines, edited by R. Siva Kumar, was published.

Ramachandran was the author of an extensive study on Kerala temple murals (Painted Abode of Gods: Mural Traditions of Kerala – 2006). In 2012 Ramachandran wrote Ram Kinkar: The Man and the Artist (on Ramkinkar Baij), published by the National Gallery of Modern Art, New Delhi. He has also written many articles in English which have been translated into other languages, including Japanese and his mother tongue, Malayalam. Ramachandran has written several books in Malayalam, and for six months in 2002 penned a weekly column on art and art education for the Malayala Manorama.

In 2010 a collection of Ramachandran's articles, Aannottam (Male Gaze), translated by P. Sudhakaran, was published by Kairali Books, Kerala. In 2019 Sudhakaran's translations of two Ramachandran writings, his extended autobiographical essay, "Jeevarekhakal" (LifeLine Drawings), and his 2014 work on Ram Kinkar, were published in Kerala. In 2020 The Lotus Pond: A. Ramachandran on Art and Artists, a selection of the artist's writings compiled by Vinod Bhardwaj, was released by Copper Coin Publishing.

== Awards/Posts ==
- 1969: National Award for Painting, Ministry of Culture, Government of India
- 1973: National Award for Painting, Ministry of Culture, Government of India
- 1976: Elected to General Council of Lalit Kala Akademi as an eminent artist
- 1978: Noma Concours Award, Asia/Pacific Cultural Centre, UNESCO
- 1978: Appointed a commissioner with two others for the fourth Indian Triennale. Resigned when artists they selected for event were rejected
- 1980: Noma Concours Award, Asia/Pacific Cultural Centre, UNESCO
- 1991: Parishad Samman from Sahitya Kala Parishad, New Delhi
- 1991: Appointed Chairperson, Kerala Lalithakala Akademi
- 1993: Appointed Visitor’s (President of India) Nominee for appointments at Visva-Bharati University, Santiniketan
- 1994: Raja Ravi Varma Puraskaram, Government of Kerala
- 1998: Appointed Trustee-Member of the Indira Gandhi National Centre for Arts (IGNCA), New Delhi. Reappointed 2004
- 2000: Gagan-Abani Puraskar from alma mater, Visva Bharati University, Santiniketan
- 2001: Manaviyam Award, Manaviyam Cultural Mission, Government of Kerala
- 2002: Elected a Fellow of the Lalit Kala Akademi
- 2003: Raja Ravi Varma Puraskaram, Government of Kerala
- 2005: Padma Bhushan, Government of India
- 2005: Professor Emeritus, Jamia Millia Islamia University
- 2008: Japanese Government Award for Welfare and Culture for Children, for book Ten Woodcutters
- 2013: Honorary Doctor of Letters, Mahatma Gandhi University, Kottayam
- 2018: Kalidas Samman, Government of Madhya Pradesh
- 2020: Lifetime Achievement Award, India Today

== Selected books and documentaries on A. Ramachandran ==
- Ramachandran: Art of the Muralist, Rupika Chawla, A Kala Yatra /Sista's Publication, 1994
- Ramachandran, Icons of the Raw Earth, Rupika Chawla, A Kala Yatra Publication, 1998
- The Art of A Ramachandran, Ella Dutta, Pocket Art Series, Roli Books, 2000
- Ramachandrante Kala (in Malayalam), P. Surendran, Kala Yatra Publication, 2001. Won the Kerala Lalita Kala Akademi's first award for art criticism. Second edition published in 2024
- A. Ramachandran: A Retrospective, R. Siva Kumar, National Gallery of Modern Art and Vadehra Art Gallery, Vols. I & II, 2003
- World of the Lotus Pond, documentary feature by K. Vikram Singh, 2004
- A. Ramachandran: Life and Art in Lines, R. Siva Kumar, Vadehra Art Gallery and Lalit Kala Akademi, Vols. I & II, 2014
- A. Ramachandran (in Hindi), Vinod Bhardwaj, Rabindranath Tagore University, 2022
- Ramachandran, documentary by Vinod Bhardwaj, 2022
- Rajasthan mein A. Ramachandran: Lalit Sharma key camerey sey (in Hindi), Vinod Bhardwaj, Copper Coin publishers, 2023. It includes photographs by Lalit Sharma of the artist on sketching excursions to Bhil villages near Udaipur
- Sculptures of A. Ramachandran, documentary by Vinod Bhardwaj, 2023
