= Pigcasso =

South African pig painter (2016–2024)

- Species: Pig
- Sex: Female
- Born: April 2016; Cape Winelands District Municipality, South Africa
- Died: March 2024 (aged 7); Franschhoek, South Africa
- Occupation: Animal artist (painter)
- Years active: 2016–2024
- Owner: Joanne Lefson
- Weight: 700 kg (1500 lb)
- Named after: Pablo Picasso

Pigcasso (April 2016 – March 2024) was a 700-kilogram (1,500 lb) pig from South Africa, best known for being the first non-human artist to be given her own art exhibition, and for holding the record for most expensive artwork by an animal ever sold. Swatch used one of her paintings in its 2019 limited-edition Flying Pig timepiece.

== Life ==
=== Early life ===
Pigcasso was a female pig (Sus domesticus) born in April 2016 (Note: Some sources suggest Pigcasso was born in March 2016.) on an industrialised pig farm in the Winelands region of the Western Cape, South Africa. The following month, she was rescued along with her sister Rosie from a slaughterhouse by Joanne Lefson and taken to Farm Sanctuary SA in Franschhoek, a nonprofit animal sanctuary she founded that year. Lefson is a former professional golfer who briefly dated John Denver and traveled the world with her dog Oscar.

=== Art career ===
When Pigcasso began chewing and destroying everything in Lefson's stall besides some paint brushes, she used clicker training and positive reinforcement techniques to teach the pig to hold the brush in her mouth and apply paint to paper mounted on an easel placed before her. Pigcasso began her painting career in October 2016, which were sold to raise funds for Lefson's sanctuary. Each of Pigcasso's works were signed by dipping her nose-tip into beetroot ink and touching it onto the canvas.

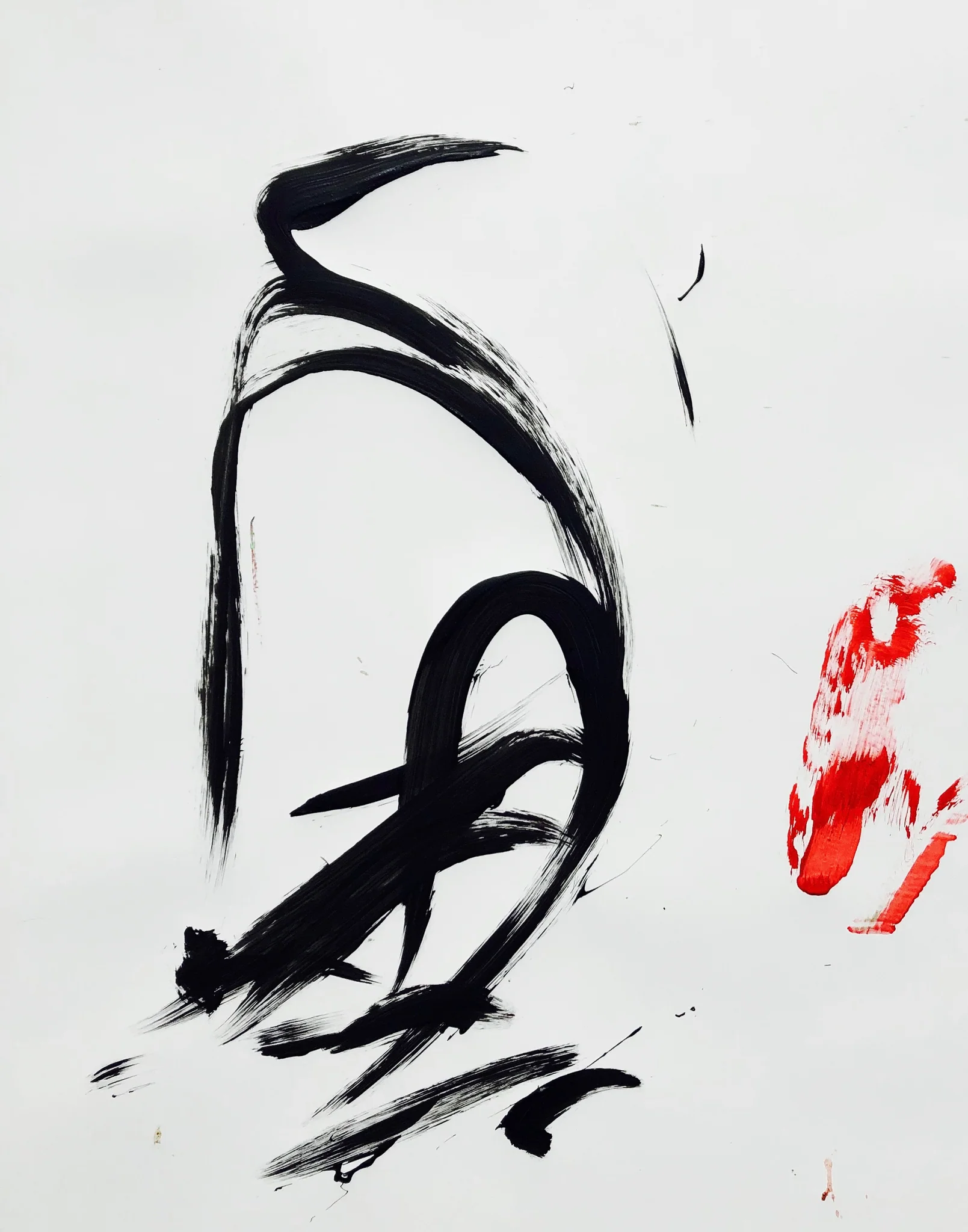
Penguin (2019)

Pigcasso and Lefson were the first non-human/human collaboration to have held an art exhibition together, Oink, which took place at the V&A Waterfront in Cape Town in 2018. Subsequently, Pigcasso's works were displayed in art exhibitions from multiple countries including the Netherlands, Germany, the UK and China. Pigcasso's artworks have been described as abstract expressionism and have sold for millions of rand to collectors around the world. Three of her most famous pieces are Penguin, Snowman, and Mouse, each of which sold for $5,000 in 2021. A painting of Prince Harry that was sold to a Spanish buyer for £2,350 in 2021 also received global notoriety, because of its subject. Works by Pigcasso have been held by Jane Goodall, Rafael Nadal, Ed Westwick, and George Clooney. On 13 December 2021, a work by Pigcasso sold for £20,000, a record price for an artwork created by an animal. The 1.6 m × 2.6 m (5.2 ft × 8.5 ft) canvas, titled Wild and Free, was purchased by German art collector Peter Esser, eclipsing the £14,000 American collector Howard Hong paid for a painting by Congo the chimpanzee. By the time of her death, Lefson had sold over $1 million worth of Pigcasso's paintings, with proceeds going towards the upkeep of the sanctuary where she lived.

The relationship between Pigcasso and Lefson has been noted for igniting debate around the definition of art and animal creativity, while also drawing attention to the living conditions of farm animals around the world. Lefson stated that her aim is to educate the public about the devastating effects of animal husbandry on the welfare of animals and the environment in order to inspire a kinder, more sustainable world.

=== Media ===
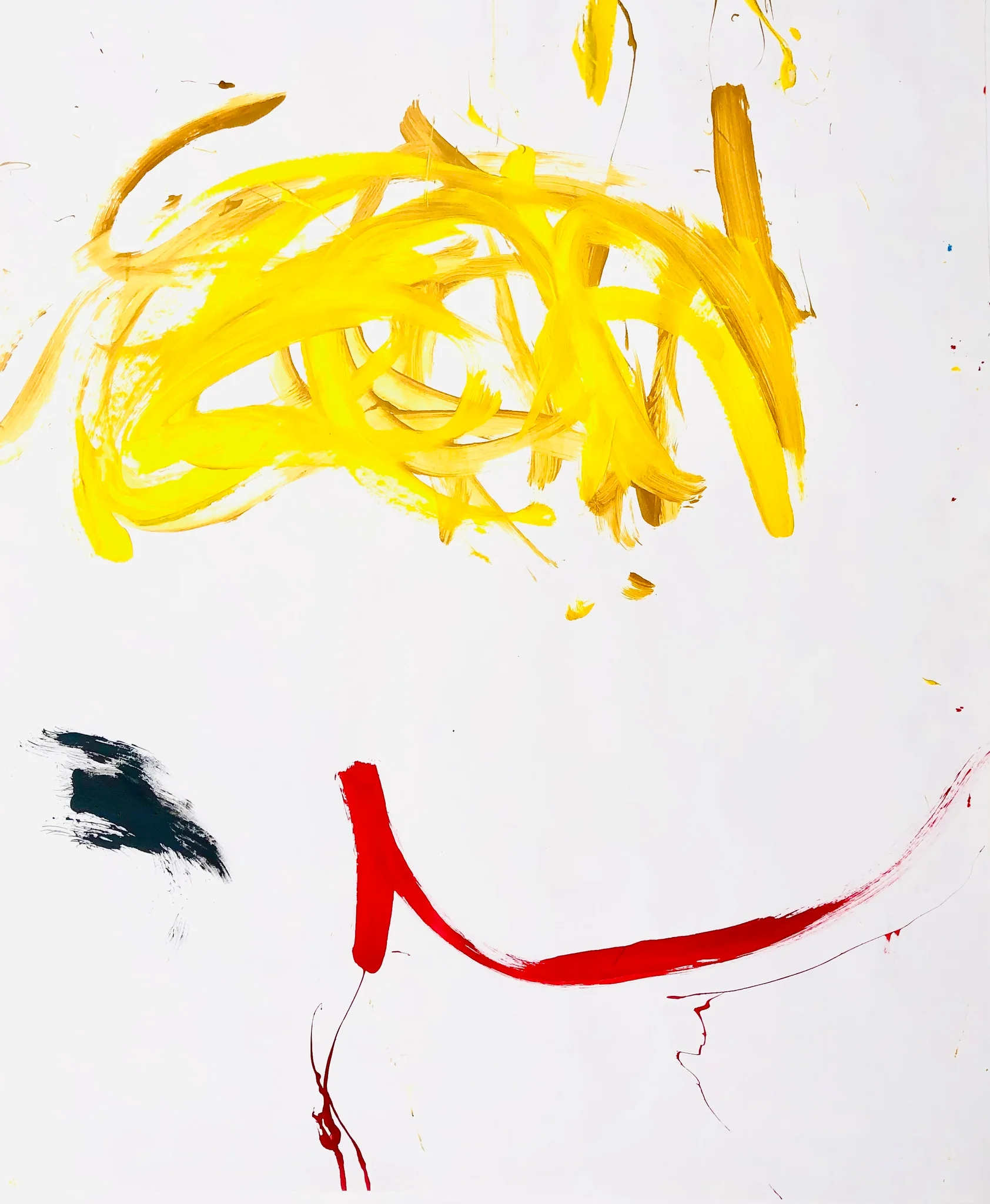
Barbie FKA Boris (2021)

The watchmaker Swatch commissioned an artwork of Pigcasso's for a 2019 watch called Flying Pig. She was also featured in the 60th anniversary advertisement of the Nissan Skyline (2017), and in 2020, a "Pigcasso" range of wine, produced from the grapes that grow at the farm sanctuary where she lived, was launched.

Over the course of her life, Pigcasso was featured on various global media channels. Her exploits were covered on Saturday Night Live, ABC, NBC, CBS, CNN, National Geographic, Sky News, and the BBC. Pigcasso also appeared live on The Jeremy Vine Show in 2020 and in publications such as The Times newspaper and Der Spiegel. In August 2023, a book about Pigcasso’s life was released in London, titled Pigcasso. The Pig That Saved a Sanctuary, which includes a foreword by Jane Goodall.

A feature-length documentary chronicling Pigcasso’s journey from a piglet rescued from slaughter to becoming the world’s first painting pig premiered at the 2025 Durban International Film Festival as an official selection. The film is directed by award-winning South African filmmaker Stefan Enslin.

=== Illness and death ===
Pigcasso had chronic rheumatoid arthritis, which calcified her spine. Her condition deteriorated rapidly in September 2023 and by October her hind legs were nearly non-functional. On 6 March 2024, Lefson announced that Pigcasso had died. Among Pigcasso's many admirers, Jane Goodall was present to pay her respects the day after she died. Goodall flew out to the sanctuary after hearing about the pig's condition, but arrived one day too late, with Pigcasso passing away before the two had a chance to formally meet. The next day, Goodall shared a tribute for the pig at a gala hosted by the sanctuary, raising R300,000 (or USD16,062) for her non-profit organisation.
