= Siena: The Rise of Painting, 1300–1350 =

2024–2025 art exhibition

Siena: The Rise of Painting, 1300–1350, is an exhibition of Sienese painting displayed at the New York Metropolitan Museum of Art (2024–2025) and London National Gallery (2025).

== Exhibition ==
The exhibition will run at the New York Metropolitan Museum of Art from October 13, 2024, to January 26, 2025, before showing at the London National Gallery from March 8 to June 22, 2025.
