= Melvin Way =

American folk artist (1954–2024)

- Born: January 3, 1954; Ruffin, South Carolina, U.S
- Died: February 4, 2024 (aged 70); Smoaks, South Carolina, U.S.
- Other name: Melvin Milky Way

Melvin Way (January 3, 1954 – February 4, 2024) was an American folk artist.

His works are held in the collections of the American Folk Art Museum, American Visionary Art Museum, Centre Pompidou, Collection de l’Art Brut, Museum of Modern Art, and the Smithsonian American Art Museum.

== Early life ==
Melvin Way was born on January 3, 1954, in Ruffin, South Carolina. As a child he lived both there and in Brooklyn. He moved to New York City permanently in the 1970s to attend R.C.A. Technical School in midtown Manhattan, where he learned the skills to work as a machinist. While there, he also played bass for local bands.

== Art career ==
By 1989, Way lived at Keener Men’s Shelter on Wards Island. The shelter was run by Hospital Audiences International, which offered art workshops to residents with disabilities. There, Way met artist Andrew Castrucci, who ran art workshops for the shelter's residents. Castrucci recognized Way's talent and became a lifelong friend and supportive figure.

Way's first art pieces were intricate drawings made with ballpoint pens on found paper. His works also included text, mathematical equations, and chemical formulas. He often carried his works and works in progress in his pockets, using scotch tape to protect their surfaces.

By the early 1990s, Way began exhibiting work at Outsider artist fairs.

Way was represented by the Andrew Edlin Gallery.

== Personal life and death ==
Way was African-American. He became homeless in his 20s, after a schizophrenia diagnosis and drug use.

Way died in Smoaks, South Carolina due to complications of a stroke on February 4, 2024, at the age of 70.

== Selected exhibitions ==
- 2015: Melvin Way: Gaga City; Christian Berst Art Brut, Manhattan
- 2018: Melvin Way: The Cocaine Files Dossier (1989-2017); Andrew Edlin Gallery, New York City
