= James Magee (artist) =

American artist (1945–2024)

James Robert Magee (June 3, 1945 – September 14, 2024) was an American visual artist from Fremont, Michigan. Prior to his death, he was based in El Paso, Texas, where he developed most of his artistic career. His main artistic focus was The Hill of James Magee, an art installation located in the Chihuahuan Desert, one hour and twenty minutes outside of El Paso.

== Early life ==
Born in Fremont, Michigan on June 3, 1945, James Magee attended Alma College in Alma, Michigan, where he majored in history and minored in French and graduated in 1968. In 1971, he obtained a Juris Doctor degree from the University of Pennsylvania Law School. Mr. Magee spent the immediate two years of his post-college life living in Paris as an assistant to the American sculptor Caroline Lee and her partner, the Serbian sculptor Radivoje Knežević. He then lived in New York for ten years, where he worked diverse jobs such as cab driver, union welder and assistant to Tommy Koh, the Singapore Ambassador to the United Nations. This last job allowed him to travel to Geneva, where he wrote structural analysis for the UN Law of the Sea Conference.

During this time in New York, Mr. Magee began performing his poetry in the piers at the end of Christopher Street. This particular experience in the city, and the overall gay scene in the 1970s, were one of the inspirations for The Hill and the pieces contained therein, as well as their poetic titles.

He moved to El Paso, Texas, in 1981, and in 1982, he began acquiring 2000 acres of land in the desert outside of the city, where he began construction of a complex of buildings referred to later as The Hill.

== Artistic career ==
Although he engaged in many artistic disciplines, including performance and writing, Mr. Magee avoided calling himself an artist. He was, however, intimately involved in the artistic activity of his dear friend, the painter Annabel Livermore, whom various writers have described as his alter ego, a relationship referred to by The New York Times as "a tough act to follow." In fact, James Magee and Annabel Livermore were the same person, even though Magee would refer to Livermore in the third person.

According to Kerry Doyle, director of the Rubin Center at the University of Texas at El Paso, in "Letters to Goya", Ms. Livermore, a retired librarian from the Midwest, "took up painting later in her life to great success and whose work has been exhibited in museums across the United States and collected by both individuals and institutions."

Magee was also a published poet and a noted performer of his poetry, which often serves as "Titles" to specific works of sculpture, including artwork at The Hill. Some of these titles run as long as sixty lines and serve function of both poems and performances. These titles were created over the decades, and were, according to Kerry Doyle, "read aloud/performed by the artist as a complementary practice, again finding their home in a middle place, something between spoken word poetry and performance art". He has performed his poetry in various venues such as the Crowley Theatre in Marfa, 14 Pews in Houston, Yale University, and The Poetry Project at Saint Mark's Church in-the-Bowery in New York City.

== The Hill of James Magee ==
The Hill of James Magee is an art installation located in the Chihuahuan Desert, one hour and twenty minutes outside of El Paso, Texas. According to the philosopher Rudolph Weingartner, the complex "sits in a gently rolling landscape with mesmerizing views of snow-capped mountains and limitless West Texas skies, on a rising above the rocky landscape of the desert."

To get to The Hill, one must drive through the desert, "harsh, gently hilly, unremitting bright in the day, black at night, silent but for the wind and the occasional car or truck or perhaps the shriek of a mouse caught by a hawk", as Richard Bretell has written.

It is almost impossible to find the site unless guided by Mr. Magee.

== Critical reception ==
Richard Brettell, professor and art historian at the University of Texas at Dallas, referred to James Magee as "America's greatest living unknown artist" and argues that "Art historians who know it well are a varied and fascinating group, and included (to name only five) the late Walter Hopps, Ruth Fine, Edward Lucie-Smith, Kerry Brougher, and Jonathan Katz. Each of them felt that they had been on a kind of pilgrimage — and, like all faithful pilgrims, each has returned."

In 2016, the Smithsonian Archive of American Artists began acquiring material focusing on The Hill and Magee's artistic career. According to the Smithsonian's website, the collection includes "correspondence, photographs, writings, printed material, drawings, a CD of Magee's "titles" or poems, and audio visual material including audio cassettes and a reel-to-reel audio recording".

== Later life and death ==
Magee died from colon and prostate cancer in Fremont, on September 14, 2024, at the age of 79.
