= Rafig Nasirov =

Azerbaijani painter, architect and film set designer (1947–2024)

- Rafiq Nəsirov
- Born: 27 May 1947; Sabirabad, Azerbaijan SSR, USSR
- Died: 29 November 2024 (aged 77)
- Occupation: Painter
- Awards: Honored Artist of Azerbaijan

Rafig Alish oghlu Nasirov (Azerbaijani: Rafiq Əliş oğlu Nəsirov, 27 May 1947 – 29 November 2024) was an Azerbaijani painter, architect, and film set designer.

Nasirov was an "Honored Artist of Azerbaijan" (2000) and People's Artist (2007), Personal pensioner of the President of the Republic of Azerbaijan (2017).

== Life and career ==
Rafiq Nasirov was born on 27 May 1947, in the city of Sabirabad. In 1961, he began studying at the Faculty of Architecture of the Polytechnic Technical College. After graduating from technical school in 1964, he entered the Faculty of Architecture of Azerbaijan Polytechnic Institute.

From 1969 he worked as an architect in the Azerbaijanfilm film studio named after J. Jabbarli, and from 1980 he was responsible for the department of decorative devices, and since the same year he worked as a set designer. During these years, he designed more than 40 feature films.

Nasirov died on 29 November 2024, at the age of 77.

== Awards ==
- Honored Artist of Azerbaijan – 18 December 2000
- Humay Award – 2003
- People's Artist of Azerbaijan – 1 August 2007
- Personal Pension of the President of the Republic of Azerbaijan – 31 July 2017
