= Noma Concours for Picture Book Illustrations =

The Noma Concours for Picture Book Illustrations (Japanese: 野間国際絵本原画コンクール) was organised by Asia/Pacific Cultural Centre for UNESCO (ACCU) supported by the Noma International Book Development Fund from 1978 to 2008. It was an annual competition, ending in 2008.

The prize was named after Shoichi Noma, the fourth president of the Japanese family-run publishing house Kodansha Ltd. At the 1963 Frankfurt Book Fair, he gave a speech entitled "Cultural Exchange in Publishing", in which he said “In order to advance and sustain world peace, it is most important to develop international mutual understanding by means of cross-cultural interchange through publishing.” In this spirit, several Noma Awards were set up: the Noma Award for Publishing in Africa, established in 1980; the Noma Literary Prize, also established in 1980; and the Noma Award for the Translation of Japanese Literature, established in 1980 to commemorate Kodansha’s 80th anniversary.

The aim of the competition was to discover up-and-coming illustrators, graphic designers and artists in Asia (except Japan), the Pacific, Africa, Arab States, and Latin America & the Caribbean, and to provide an opportunity at which they could present their works to offer incentives for their creative activities. Prizewinning works were displayed in exhibitions such as the International Library of Children's Literature in Ueno, Tokyo, and the Biennial of Illustration Bratislava in Slovakia.

== The 16th Noma Concours (2008) ==
Grand Prize

- Nadi & Xiao Lan by Wen Hsu (Costa Rica)

Second Prize

- The Princess by Fereshteh Najafi (Iran)
- An Hour that Is Neither Day nor Night by Alaeldin Elgizouli Naeim (Sudan)

Runners Up

- Puppet of Rag and Paper by Vinka Grbic Segura (Chile)
- The Girl and the Jungle by Edi Sarwono (Indonesia)
- Yusuf and Zulaikha by Leila Fathizadeh (Iran)
- Boots by Parastou Khodaparast Haghi (Iran)
- The Spelled City by Parisa Arta (Iran)
- Wolves and Humans by Saba Maasoumian (Iran)
- Strange Interview by Kim Joo-Kyung (Republic of Korea)
- The Wall by Park Soo-Hyun (Republic of Korea)
- Pumla and the Chickens by Shelley Johnson (illustrator) (South Africa)
- The Princess with the Binocular by Ta Huy Long (Vietnam)

Encouragement Prize

- Vovó by Claudio Martins (Brazil)
- Many Indigenous Stories about the Origin of the Universe and Other *Things by Mauricio Negro (Brazil)
- The Great Deluge by Pradyumna Kumar (India)
- Zahhak by Alireza Joday (Iran)
- The Singer Wolf by Atefeh Malekijoo (Iran)
- The Princess who Liked to Eat Apples by Azita Arta (Iran)
- Sara, Apple Jam & River by Hoda Hadadi (Iran)
- I Received Your Letter Right Now by Maryam Mouliyai (Iran)
- The Hero's Trick by Narges Mohammadi (illustrator) (Iran)
- The Disloyal Friend by Rashin Kheyrieh (Iran)
- Sansarinaga and the Beautiful Toy Buffalo by Jainal Amambing (Malaysia)
- The Alebrije Origin by Diana Tiznado Palmieri (Mexico)
- The Shoes Story by Rosario Román Alonso (Mexico)
- Naku, Nakuu, Nakuuu! by Sergio T. Bumatay III (Philippines)
- Lost and Found by Cho Seoung-Hyon (Republic of Korea)
- The Baby Black Cloud by Ji Yee-Jung (Republic of Korea)
- My Grandpa Is a Taxi Driver Delivering Happiness by Kim Hyo-Jin (Republic of Korea)
- To Catch a Puhul Thief by Ladduwa Hettige Asanga (Sri Lanka)
- Descendants-Mahouts-Elephants: The Story of Thai Elephant Part 2 by Pallop Wangborn (Thailand)
- Founding of Sfax by Raouf Karray (Tunisia)

== The 15th Noma Concours (2007) ==
Grand Prize

- How the Firefly Got Its Light by Pradyumna Kumar (India)

Second Prize

- The Princess Who Couldn't Laugh by Narges Mohammadi (illustrator) (Iran)
- The Last Day I Lived in a Long House by Jainal Amambing (Malaysia)

Runners Up

- Tap, Tap, Tap by Afra Nobahar (Iran)
- The Fox by Amir Shaabanipour (Iran)
- Love Stories by Atyeh Bozorg Sohrabi (Iran)
- Lili Lili Hozak by Mojtaba Ossyany (Iran)
- Land Below the Wind by Awang Fadilah Bin Ali Hussein (Malaysia)
- My Home Is My Pet by Jose Miguel Tejido (Philippines)
- The Flying Birds by Kim Joo-Kyung (Republic of Korea)
- A Book That Nobody Has Opened by Oh Jung-Taek (Republic of Korea)
- Strange Dream by Mazin Alaeldin Elgizouli (Sudan)
- The Story of the Thai Elephant by Pallop Wangborn (Thailand)

Encouragement Prize

- The Red Cricket by Ana Milena Torres Hernández (Colombia)
- Don Cat by Marco Javier Chamorro Aldas (Ecuador)
- Think Twice by Mamadú Candé (Guinea-Bissau)
- The Old Man Who Could Make Trees Flourishing with Flowers by Agustinus Hari Santosa (Indonesia)
- The Land of Water-lilies by Ali Boozari (Iran)
- The Love Journey of the Pilgrim by Ali Hashemi Shahraki (Iran)
- The Angel and the Moon by Ali Namvar (Iran)
- Queen of Ants and Her Princesses by Azadeh Madani (Iran)
- Mitra by Banafsheh Erfaniyan (Iran)
- Whose House Is This? by Hassan Amekan (Iran)
- The Red Ladybird by Marjan Vafaeian (Iran)
- Our Earth, Our Heart by Reza Lavasani (Iran)
- The Trip of a Butterfly by Morteza Zahedi (Iran)
- Forest Dream by Nasrin Fallahpour (Iran)
- The Road by Negin Ehtesabian (Iran)
- The Owl and the Jaybird by Nooshin Safakhoo (Iran)
- The Dancing Technique by Tito Muatha Mutua (Kenya)
- Animal Farm by Yoo Jun-Jae (Republic of Korea)
- The Vatu Bird by Manoranjana Herath Bandara (Sri Lanka)
- This Is God's Creation by Loujaina Al-Assil (Syria)

== The 14th Noma Concours (2006) ==
Grand Prize

- My Home by Bolormaa Baasansuren

Second Prize

- God of Thunder by Cen Long
- The Race by Salah Eldin Ibrahim Adam

== The 13th Noma Concours (2002) ==
Grand Prize

- I Have a House by Claudia Legnazzi

Second Prize

- The Son Who Caught the Tiger by Park Chul Min
- Sun Canary, Moon Canary! by Piet Grobler

== The 12th Noma Concours (2000) ==
Grand Prize

- The Girl of the Wish Garden by Nasrin Khosravi

Second Prize

- The Wonder Sparrow by Jainal Amambing
- Mrs. Colour by Lee Hye Kyung

== The 11th Noma Concours (1998) ==
Grand Prize

- Majed and His Friends by Hussein Gamaan (Sudan)

Second Prize

- The Elephant in a Dark Room by Feeroozeh Golmohammadi (Iran)
- Thin Soldier by Ferdinand R. Doctolero (Philippines)

== The 10th Noma Concours (1996) ==
Grand Prize

- The Real Elephant by Mohd. Yusof bin Ismail (Malaysia)

Second Prize

- Here I Am! by Piet Grobler (South Africa)
- The Owner of the Light by Irene Savino (Venezuela)

== The 9th Noma Concours (1994) ==
Grand Prize

- How the Creatures Chose the Colours by Seif Eddeen L'owta (Sudan)

Second Prize

- How Shimba and His Herd Rescued the Forest by Lazaro Enriquez Reyes (Cuba)
- The Crescent Moon, Poems by Rabindranath Tagore by Reza Lavasani (Iran)

== The 8th Noma Concours (1992) ==
Grand Prize

- The Ugly Ducking by Park Sung-Woan (Republic of Korea)

Second Prize

- The Strife over the Magic Snail by Fabricio V. Broeck (Mexico)
- The Guessing Boys by Munkhjin Tsultemin (Mongolia)

== The 7th Noma Concours (1990) ==
Grand Prize

- Animals Have Many Faces by Enrique Martinez (Cuba)

Second Prize

- Cindelaras by M.Salim (Indonesia)
- The Song of the Trees by Mahmoud Gahalla (Sudan)

== The 6th Noma Concours (1988) ==
Grand Prize

- When Nazha Created a Tremendous Uproar in the Sea by Yu Dawu (China)

Second Prize

- The Tortoise and the Elephant by Ademora Adekola (Nigeria)
- Thai Sweets by Krirkbura Yomnak (Thailand)

== The 5th Noma Concours (1986) ==
Grand Prize

- The Dinosaur of the Desert by Kang Woo-Hyun (Republic of Korea)

Second Prize

- The Amazed City by Eduardo Muñoz Bachs (Cuba)
- The Flower Fairy by Xu Lele (China)

== The 4th Noma Concours (1984) ==
Grand Prize

- Mr. Fox by Gavin Bishop (New Zealand)

Second Prize

- Games by Seif Eddeen Lowta (Sudan)
- Chitku by Mrinal Mitra (India)

== The 3rd Noma Concours (1982) ==
Grand Prize

- A Plane and A Viola by Gian Calvi (Brazil)

Second Prize

- The Nine-Coloured Deer by Feng Jiannan (China)
- The Dream of Being Great by Luis Cabrera Hernandez (Cuba)

== The 2nd Noma Concours (1980) ==
Grand Prize

- Ancient Chinese Fables by Zhang Shi-ming (China)

Second Prize

- One Day by Jagdish Joshi (India)
- Momo by Rui de Oliveira (Brazil)

== The 1st Noma Concours (1978) ==
Grand Prize

- If the Animals Had Coloured Faces by Nikzad Nojoumi (Iran)
- The Hero of Champions by Ali-Akbar Sadeghi (Iran)

Second Prize

- Chen Sheng and Wu Kuang by Tai Tun-pang (China)
- Uniforms by Mickey Patel (India)
- The Land of Ramol by A. Ramachandran (India)
- What Did the Bird Say? by Bahman Dadkha (Iran)
- Children of the Forest by Abdulahi Mohd Eltaieb (Sudan)
