= The Hill of James Magee =

Art installation in El Paso, Texas

Coordinates: 31°46′2″N 105°27′37″W

The Hill of James Magee, also referred to as Jim Magee's Hill, James Magee's Hill, The Magee Hill, or simply The Hill, is an art installation located in Chihuahuan Desert, one hour and twenty minutes outside of El Paso, Texas.

== Background ==
James Magee (1945–2024) drew on his experience performing his poetry in the piers at the end of Christopher Street in New York City, and the overall gay scene in the 1970s, when conceiving The Hill, and the pieces contained therein, as well as their titles, began to take shape during this period.

He moved to El Paso, Texas, in 1981, and in 1982 he began acquiring 2000 acres of land in the desert outside of El Paso where he would begin construction of a complex of buildings referred to later as The Hill.

Magee was also a poet; his poetry often serves as titles to specific works of sculpture, including artwork at The Hill.

== Location ==
The Hill, located in the Chihuahuan Desert, is a “relatively short drive” from El Paso, Texas. The complex “sits in a gently rolling landscape with mesmerizing views of snow-capped mountains and limitless West Texas skies”, on a rising above the rocky landscape of the desert.

To get to The Hill, one must drive through the desert, “harsh, gently hilly, unremitting bright in the day, black at night, silent but for the wind and the occasional car or truck or perhaps the shriek of a mouse caught by a hawk”, as Richard Bretell put it.

It was almost impossible to find the site unless one was guided to it by Magee.

== Architecture & Building Interiors ==
The complex of stone buildings consists of four identical structures with flat roofs, each building measuring forty feet long, twenty feet wide, and seventeen feet tall. All buildings are precisely aligned with the cardinal points, forming a compass, and contains two “17-foot-tall, hand-made, rust-steel doors, which open with a screech and clang”.

The east and west buildings face each other, as do the north and south buildings, all of which sit upon raised stoned walkways and pedestals that form a cross, measuring 187 feet from door to door. The construction site, in its entirety, encompasses 52,000 square feet. The buildings were made using rough-cut local shale rock ranging in color from yellow to peach.

According to Magee, construction of The Hill began with “no architect, no blueprints, the entire construction was laid out with me pacing and using a string and a transom”. It took approximately 250 eight-ton truckloads of stone to create The Hill, and the whole project was built by hand by the artist and a few aides that come and go.

Each of the four buildings of The Hill contain tryptic produced by the artist as well. As Bob Ostertag writes, “the art [within the buildings] defies description. Giant works of many tons each. Steel and iron triptychs on huge ball bearings. Studies in rust and decay and debris. Acid and honey. Beeswax and burnt rubber, Paprika and cold-rolled steel. Barbed wire and pig bone.”

There is no electricity in the art installation, so all light in the buildings is natural light coming in through skylights. According to Brettell, “light defines the interiors each day, regardless of visitors. The works, in other words, are lit not for the viewers but part of a natural cycle; when we enter each building, we know that its interior is beautifully illuminated whether or not we are there."

== Critical reception ==
The Hill has been recognized as one of the most important contemporary works of art in America by various art historians and critics. Richard Brettell argues that “art historians who know it [The Hill] well are a varied and fascinating group, and included (to name only five) the late Walter Hopps, Ruth Fine, Edward Lucie-Smith, Kerry Brougher, and Jonathan Katz. Each of them felt that they had been on a kind of pilgrimage — and, like all faithful pilgrims, each has returned.”

In fact, Walter Hopps praised The Hill of James Magee as a “…magnificent achievement comparable in quality to Smithson’s Spiral Jetty, Heizer’s Complex I and Complex II, Turrell’s Roden Crater and De Maria’s Lighting Field.”

Willard Spiegelman from the Wall Street Journal calls The Hill a “masterwork… impressive, indeed extraordinary… a map of the imagination," and Pamela Petro writes “… an extremely American work… reducing articulate art historians to murmuring wonder… a work capable of making adults weep and begetting terror… whose meaning is too abstract to grasp — a sacred space that extends particularly straight to the imagination.”

In 2016, the Smithsonian Archive of American Art acquired all archives focusing on The Hill and his artistic career. The collection includes “correspondence, photographs, writings, printed material, drawings, a CD of Magee's "titles" or poems, and audio visual material including audio cassettes and a reel-to-reel audio recording”.
