= Statue of Elizabeth II, Oakham =

Statue in Rutland, England

Statue of Elizabeth II
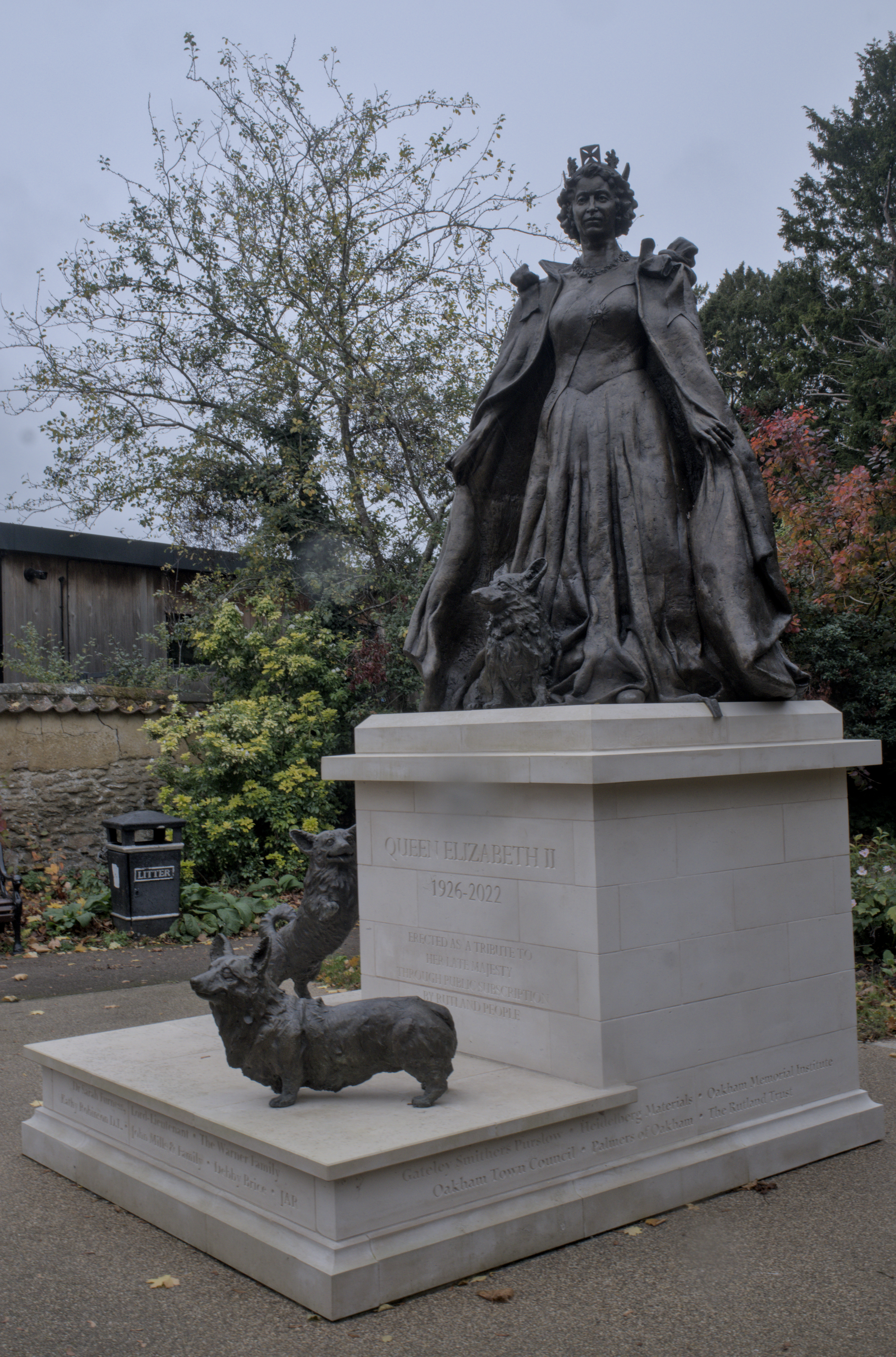
- Interactive map of Statue of Elizabeth II
- Location: Oakham, Rutland, England
- Coordinates: 52.669102°N 0.725403°W
- Designer: Hywel Pratley
- Type: Memorial
- Material: Bronze
- Opening date: 21 April 2024
- Dedicated to: Elizabeth II

A statue of Queen Elizabeth II by Hywel Pratley stands in Oakham, the county town of Rutland in the East Midlands of England. It was unveiled on 21 April 2024, which would have been the Queen's 98th birthday. The 7ft (2.1m) tall sculpture was commissioned by the Lord Lieutenant of Rutland and was funded via donations from businesses and members of the public, at a cost of £125,000. It is the first memorial to Elizabeth II to have been unveiled after her death in September 2022. The statue portrays the Queen in Garter robes and sash wearing the George IV State Diadem, with one royal corgi at her feet and another two on the plinth. Inscribed beneath it are the words "Queen Elizabeth II, 1926–2022. Erected as a tribute to her late Majesty through public subscription by Rutland people". The statue was unveiled by the MP Alicia Kearns in the presence of 400 people and nearly 50 corgis.
