= Hywel Pratley =

British sculptor

- Born: 1972
- Occupation: Sculptor
- Website: www.hywelpratley.com

Hywel Brân Pratley (born 1972) is a British sculptor.

Pratley began his working life as an English teacher, at Hurlingham and Chelsea Secondary School, then studied sculpture at Florence Academy of Art from 2004 to 2007.

His public works include a monument to Joseph Williamson at Sir Joseph Williamson's Mathematical School, a monument to the tenth century philosopher Al-Farabi in Almaty, Kazakhstan, and a statue of Queen Elizabeth II with corgis, in Oakham, Rutland. The latter is a 7 feet (2.1 m) tall bronze, commissioned by the Lord-Lieutenant of Rutland, Sarah Furness. It was unveiled by Alicia Kearns MP and blessed by Debbie Sellin, the Bishop of Peterborough, on 21 April 2024. A monument to Gilbert Stanley Thomas was unveiled at Cardiff University in March 2025.

Pratley was the featured artist in the fourth episode of the fourth series of Extraordinary Portraits, when he sculpted former paratrooper and round-Britain charity walker Christian Lewis.

He is a member of the Royal Society of Sculptors, and of the Society of Portrait Sculptors. He has also worked as a puppet sculptor for Spitting Image.
