= Pramod Chandra =

American art historian

Pramod Chandra (November 20, 1930 – February 19, 2016) was an Indian-born American art historian, curator and the George P. Bickford Professor of Indian and South Asian Art at Harvard University from 1980 until 2004. In 1985, Chandra curated the exhibition The Sculpture of India: 3000BC-1300AD at the National Gallery of Art, Washington D.C.

== Biography ==
Chandra was born in Varanasi, India, and attended Elphinstone College in Mumbai. His father was the museum curator and Indologist, Moti Chandra. After Elphinstone, Chandra obtained a Bachelor of Science degree from the School of Foreign Service, Georgetown University. He then returned to India and joined the Department of Art and Archaeology at the Prince of Wales Museum (now Chattrapathi Shivaji Vastu Sanghralaya) and secured a PhD from the University of Bombay (now Mumbai) in 1964. Chandra then moved to the United States to join University of Chicago, where he became a professor in 1971. He remained there until 1980, when he was appointed the George P. Bickford Professor of Indian and South Asian Art at Harvard University. He retired from the position in 2004.

== Bibliography ==
- Chandra, Pramod (1983). On the Study of Indian Art. Harvard University Press. ISBN 978-0674732377.
- Chandra, Pramod (1999). The Sculpture of India: 3000BC-1300AD. Harvard University Press. ISBN 978-0674795907.
