= 1120s in art =

- 1110s
- 1120s in art
- 1130s

Art timeline

The decade of the 1120s in art involved some significant events.

== Works ==
- 1120: Attributed to Huang Zongdao, Stag Hunt was painted.
- 1121: Unknown artist sculpts Prince Shōtoku in Hōryū-ji
- 1124: Li Tang paints Wind in the Pines Amid Ten Thousand Valleys

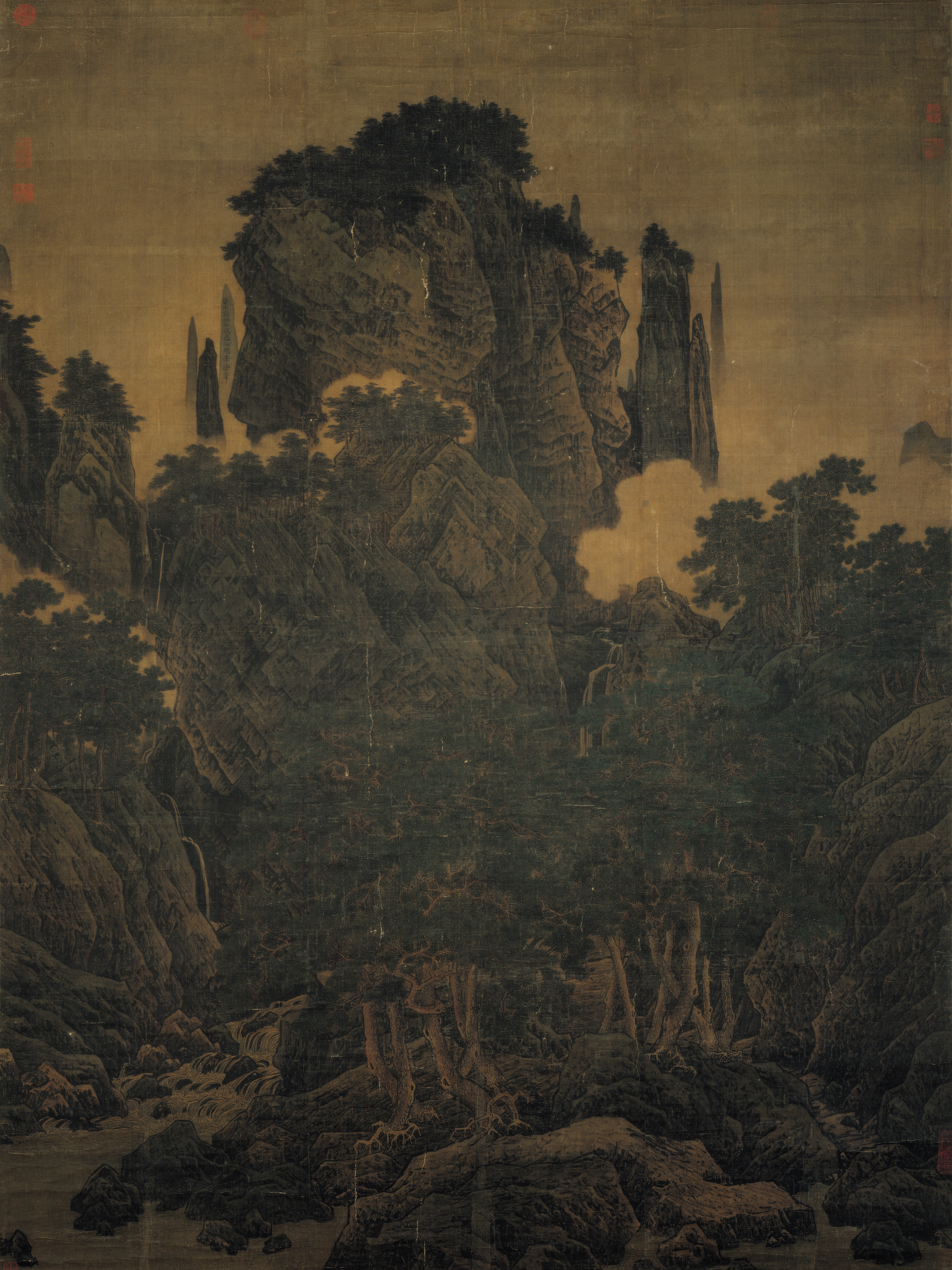
Li Tang, Wind in the Pines Amid Ten Thousand Valleys, c. 1124

== Births ==
- 1127: Lin Tinggui – Chinese painter of the Southern Song dynasty (died 1189)
- 1120: Zhao Boju – Chinese landscape and flower painter of the Southern Song dynasty (died 1182)

== Deaths ==
- 1126: Cai Jing – Chinese government official and calligrapher (born 1047)
- 1120: Fujiwara no Sadazane – Japanese calligrapher during the Heian period (born 1076)
