= 1070s in art =

List of years in art	(table)
- … 1060; 1061; 1062; 1063; 1064; 1065; 1066; 1067; 1068; 1069; 1070; 1071; 1072; 1073; 1074; 1075; 1076; 1077; 1078; 1079; 1080 …
- Art; Archaeology; Architecture; Literature; Music; Philosophy; Science; +...

- 1060s
- 1070s in art
- 1080s
Other topics in 1070s:

The decade of the 1070s in art involved some significant events.

== Events ==
- 1070's: Bayeux Tapestry (embroidery) is completed in England, possibly to unveil at the dedication of Bayeux Cathedral in 1077.

== Works ==
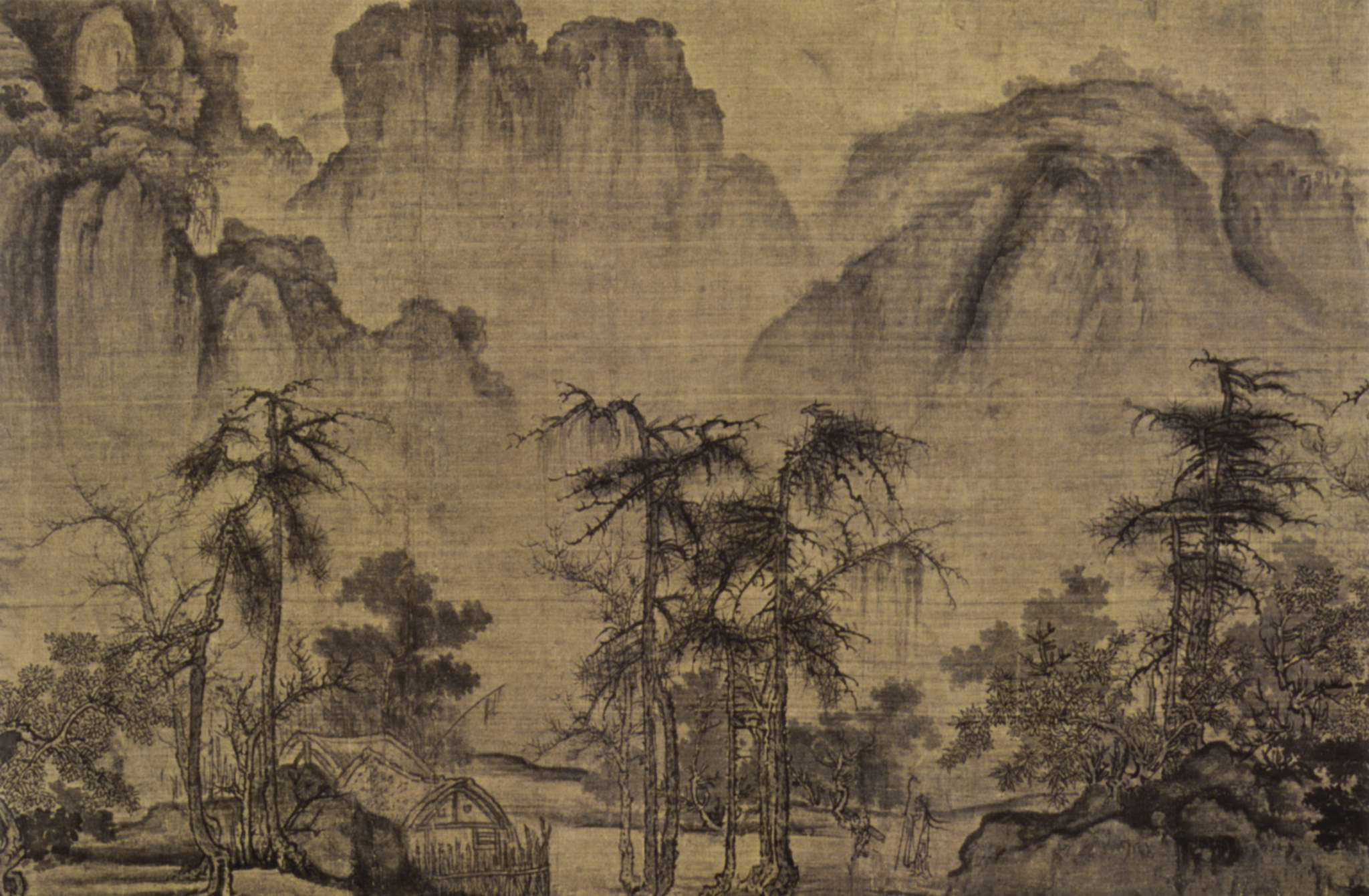
Guo Xi, Autumn in the River Valley, c. 1072

- 1072: Guo Xi paints Early Spring and Autumn in the River Valley
- 1078
  - Unknown artist sculpts Bishamonten statue in Hōryū-ji
  - Tympanum of Santiago de Compostela Cathedral in Galicia (Spain) sculpted

== Births ==
- 1073: Ibn al-Tilmīdh, Syriac Christian physician, pharmacist, poet, musician and calligrapher (died 1165)
- 1076: Fujiwara no Sadazane, Japanese calligrapher during the Heian period (died 1120)

== Deaths ==
- 1079: Wen Tong, Chinese Northern Song painter famous for his ink bamboo paintings (born 1019)
