= 1090s in art =

- 1080s
- 1090s in art
- 1100s

Art timeline

The decade of the 1090s in art involved some significant events.

== Works ==
- 1093–1097: The illuminated manuscript Stavelot Bible is completed.

== Births ==
- 1096: Wang Ximeng – Chinese court painter of the Northern Song period (died 1119)
- 1098: Yang Buzhi – Chinese master of ink paintings of plum blossoms in the Song dynasty (died 1167)
- 1098: Hildegard of Bingen – German writer, composer, philosopher, Christian mystic, Benedictine abbess, visionary, polymath, poet, and producer of miniature Illuminations (died 1179)

== Deaths ==
- 1090: Guo Xi – Chinese landscape painter who lived during the Northern Song dynasty (born 1020)
