= 1050s in art =

- 1040s
- 1050s in art
- 1060s

Art timeline

The decade of the 1050s in art involved some significant events.

== Events ==
- 1050: End of the Macedonian art period of Byzantine art

== Births ==
- c.1050: Li Tang – Chinese landscape painter (died 1130)
- 1051: Mi Fu – Chinese painter of misty landscapes, poet, and calligrapher during the Song dynasty (died 1107)

== Deaths ==
- 1057: Jōchō – Japanese sculptor of the Heian period (b. unknown)
- 1051/1053: Xu Daoning – Chinese painter of the Song dynasty (born 970)
