= 1060s in art =

- 1050s
- 1060s in art
- 1070s

Art timeline

The decade of the 1060s in art involved some significant events.

== Paintings ==
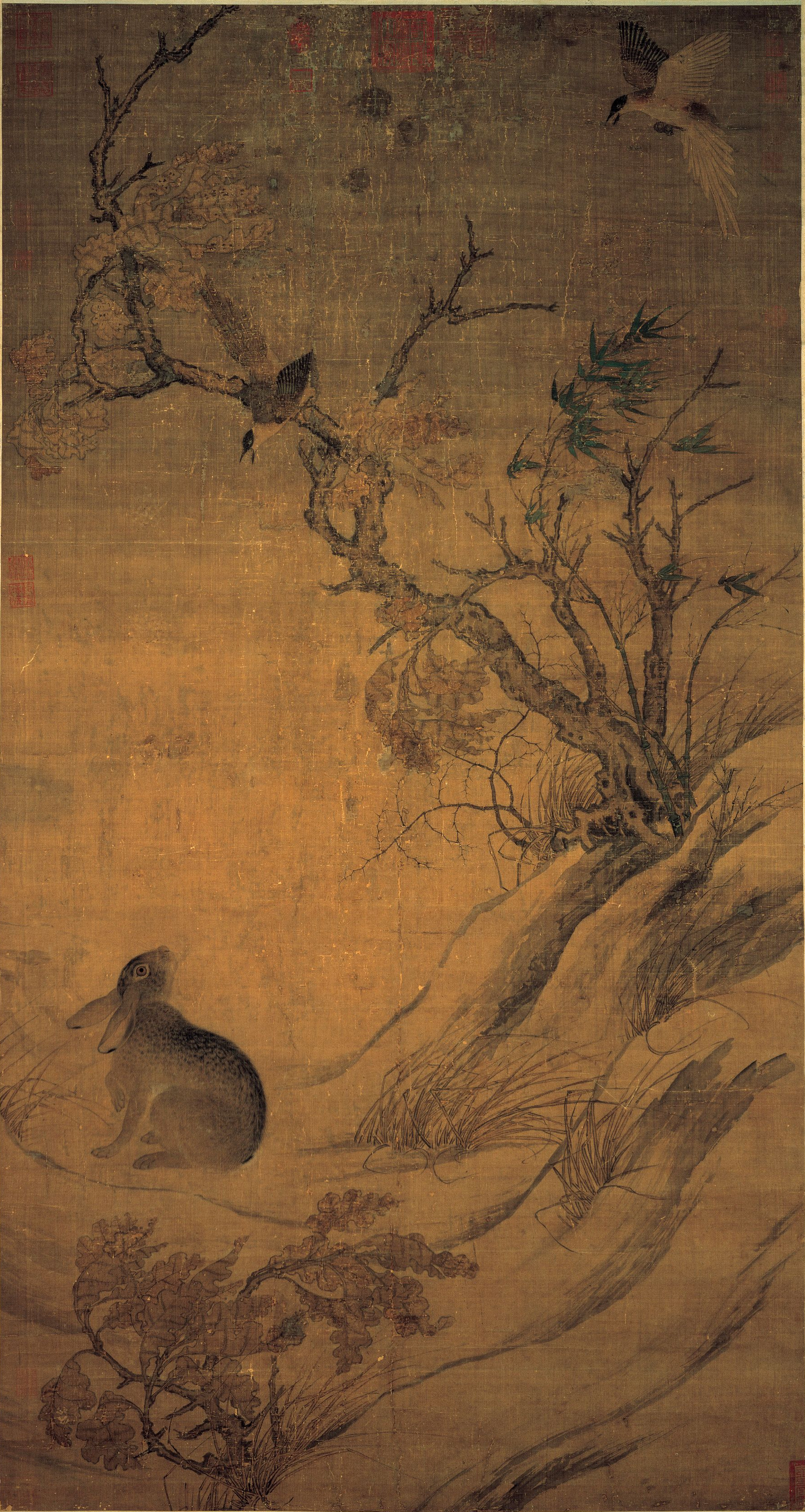
Cui Bai, "Double Happiness" or "Two Jays and a Hare", c. 1061

- 1061: Cui Bai paints "Double Happiness", also known as "Two Jays and a Hare"

== Deaths ==
- 1064: Yi Yuanji – Chinese Northern Song painter famous for his realistic paintings of animals (born 1000)

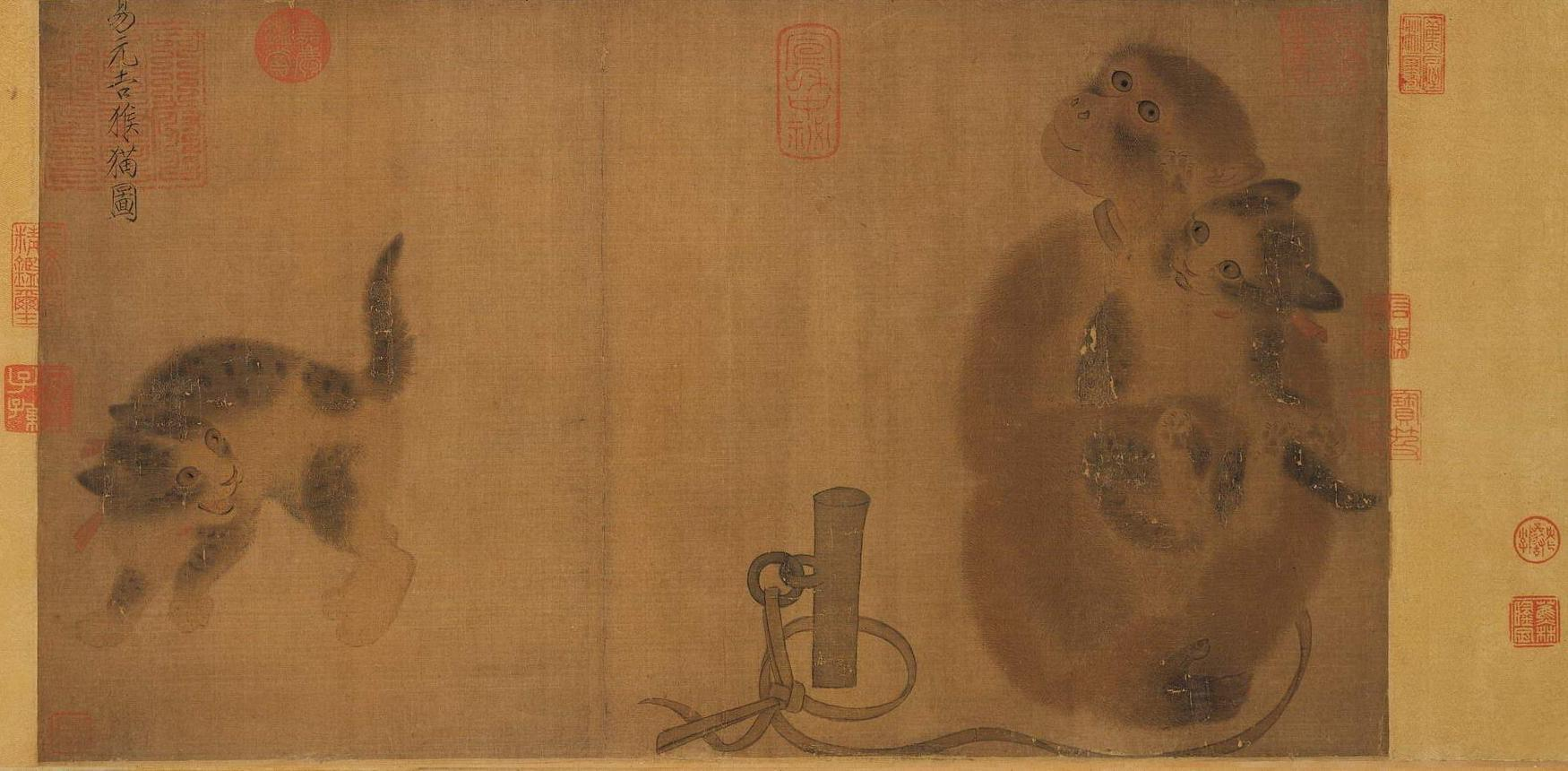
Monkey and Cats (猴貓圖) by Yi Yuanji
