= 1080s in art =

List of years in art	(table)
- … 1070; 1071; 1072; 1073; 1074; 1075; 1076; 1077; 1078; 1079; 1080; 1081; 1082; 1083; 1084; 1085; 1086; 1087; 1088; 1089; 1090 …
- Art; Archaeology; Architecture; Literature; Music; Philosophy; Science; +...

- 1070s
- 1080s in art
- 1090s
Other topics in 1080s:

The decade of the 1080s in art involved some significant events.

== Events ==
- c. 1080–1100: The Master of Daphni makes the mosaic of Christ Pantocrator in the central dome of the katholikon at Daphni Monastery in Greece
- 1081: Komnenian dynasty begins the Comnenian Age of Byzantine art

== Paintings ==
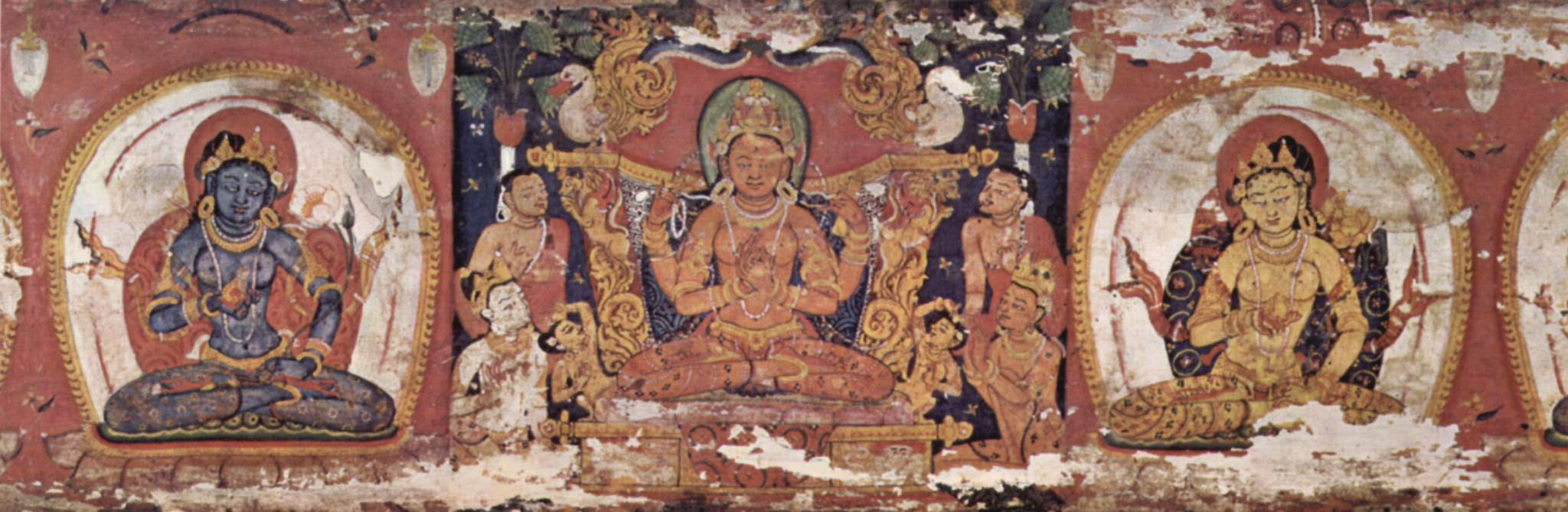
Unknown Indian painter, Completion of the Wisdom

- 1080: Unknown Indian painter – Completion of the Wisdom

== Births ==
- 1085: Zhang Zeduan – Chinese painter during the transitional period from the Northern Song to the Southern Song dynasty (died 1145)
- 1082: Emperor Huizong of Song – Chinese emperor of the Song dynasty who was also a skilled poet, painter, calligrapher, and musician (died 1135)
