= Zhang Zeduan =

Chinese painter of the Song Dynasty

- Traditional Chinese: 張擇端
- Simplified Chinese: 张择端
Transcriptions
Standard Mandarin
- Hanyu Pinyin: Zhāng Zéduān
- Bopomofo: ㄓㄤ ㄗㄜˊ ㄉㄨㄢ
- Wade–Giles: Chang^{1} Tse^{2}-tuan^{1}
- Yale Romanization: Zhāng Zé-Dwān
- IPA: [ʈʂáŋ.tsɤ̌.twán]
Yue: Cantonese
- Yale Romanization: Jēung Jaahkdyūn
- Jyutping: zoeng1 zaak6 dyun1
- IPA: [tsœŋ˥.tsak̚˨.tyn˥]

Courtesy name
- Chinese: 正道
Transcriptions
Standard Mandarin
- Hanyu Pinyin: Zhèngdào
- Bopomofo: ㄓㄥˋ ㄉㄠˋ
- Wade–Giles: Cheng^{4}-tao^{4}
- Yale Romanization: Jèng-dàu
- IPA: [ʈʂə̂ŋ.tâʊ]
Yue: Cantonese
- Yale Romanization: Jingdouh
- Jyutping: zing3 dou6
- IPA: [tsɪŋ˧.tɔw˨]

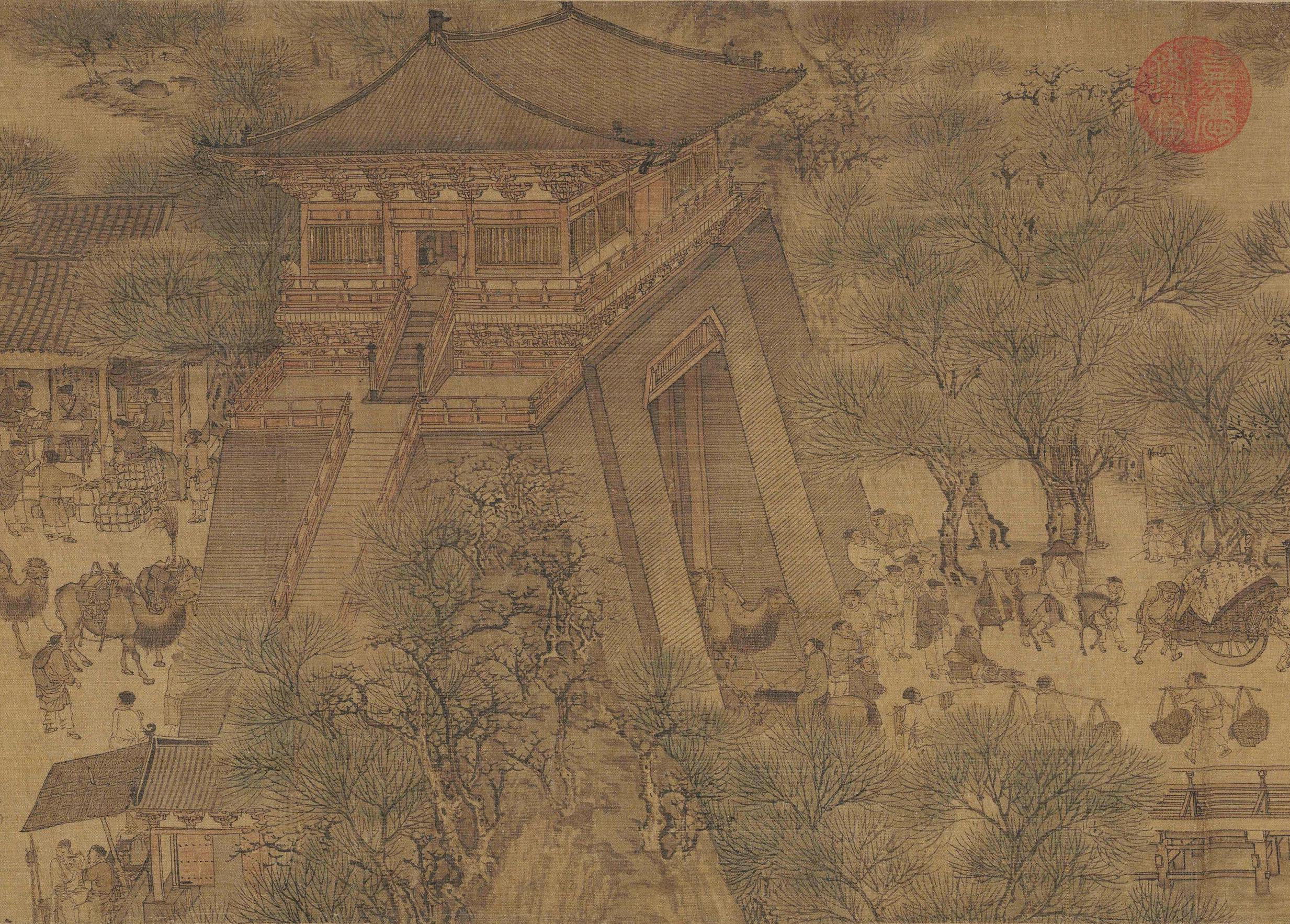
Detail of the original Along the River During the Qingming Festival by Zhang Zeduan, early 12th century

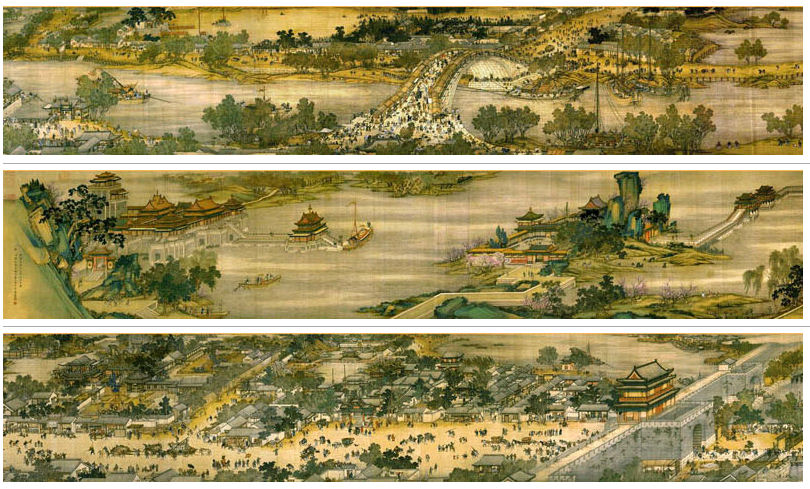
Details of the painting Along the River During the Qingming Festival, the 18th century remake.

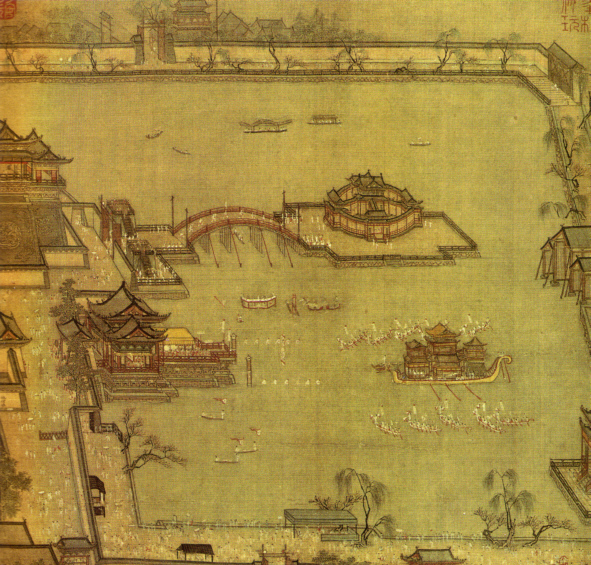
Games in the Jinming Pool

Zhang Zeduan (simplified Chinese: 张择端; traditional Chinese: 張擇端; pinyin: Zhāng Zéduān; Wade–Giles: Chang Tse-tuan; 1085–1145), courtesy name Zhengdao (Chinese: 正道), was a Chinese painter of the Song dynasty. He lived during the transitional period from the Northern Song to the Southern Song, and was instrumental in the early history of the Chinese landscape art style known as shan shui. He is known for painting Along the River During the Qingming Festival.

== See also ==
- Chinese art
- Chinese painting
- Shan shui
- Lin Tinggui
- Zhou Jichang
- Culture of the Song Dynasty
