= Old Trees, Level Distance =

Song dynasty handscroll on silk painting by Guo Xi

- Chinese: 樹色平遠圖 (Pinyin: Shù sè píng yuǎn tú)
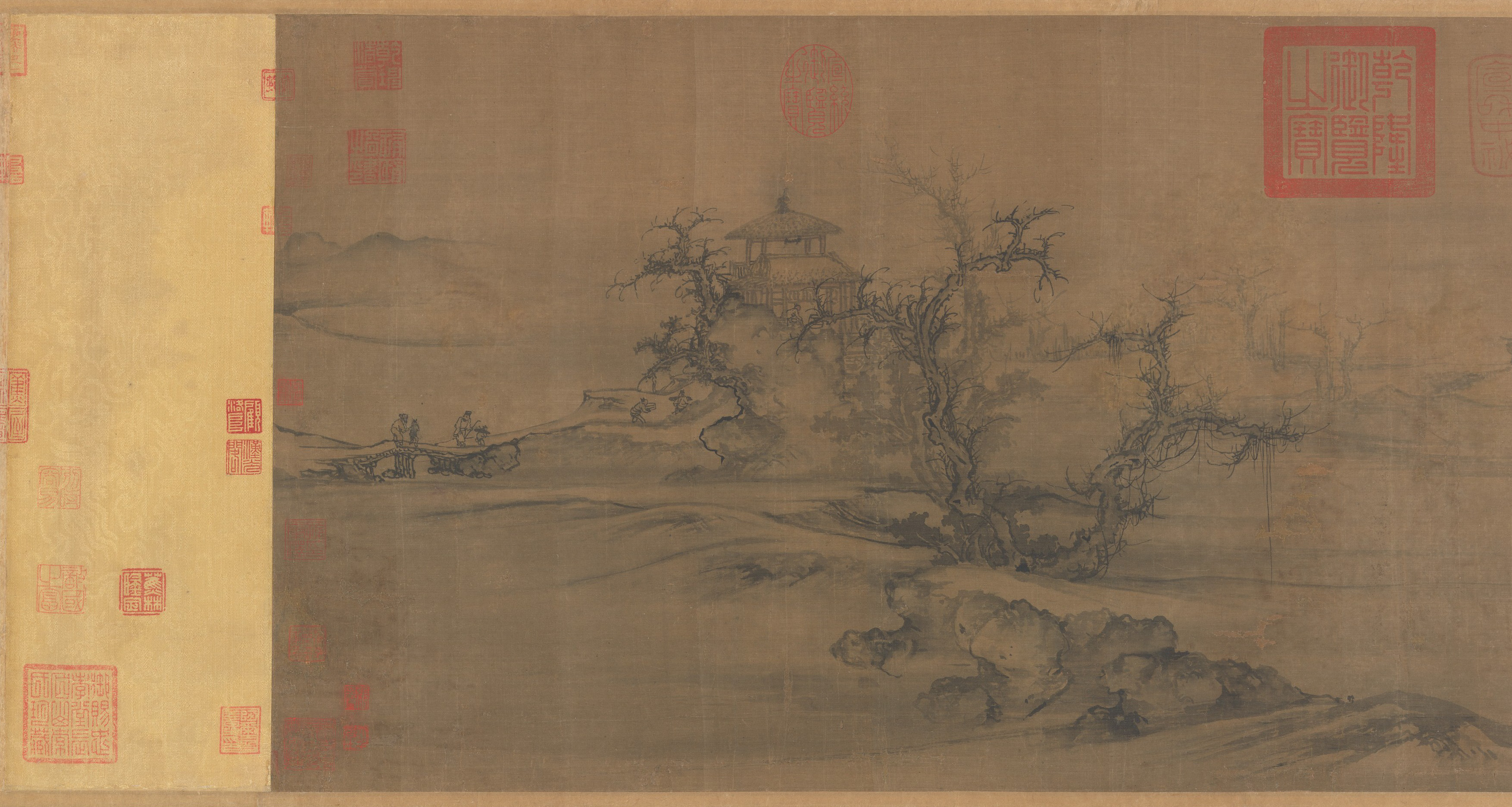
- Artist: Guo Xi
- Year: 1080
- Medium: Handscroll on silk
- Dimensions: 37.5 cm × 853.8 cm (14.8 in × 336.1 in)
- Location: Metropolitan Museum of Art, New York City, New York
- Accession: 1981.276

Old Trees, Level Distance (Traditional Chinese: 樹色平遠圖; Pinyin: Shù sè píng yuǎn tú) is a Song dynasty handscroll on silk painting by Guo Xi. Completed in 1080, it is also a considered a prominent example of the "Northern Song" style of Chinese landscapes to which this piece has often been studied alongside that of Early Spring, current housed in the National Palace Museum. It has since then been housed by the Metropolitan Museum of Art upon acquisition in 1981.

== Description ==
The handscroll itself measures 104.4 cm, but the overall length with annotations by subsequent collections, many of them Imperial, measured well over 853.8 cm.

Darkened with age, the painting depicts two fishing boats on a chilly autumn, two withered trees with hanging vines, in a wide river valley. Beyond the river in the mountains blurred to depict mist, depicts two woodcutters and a donkey on a trek towards home, fading into the distance.

At the end of the scroll (read from right to left) a rustic pavilion overlooks the river, with two old men walking their way, accompanied by five servant boys attending and setting up a picnic. With a range of lighting, shading and spacing of the scene, the depiction of the fishermen, the woodcutters, and the picnickers are self-contained but are also depicted as part of a whole scene bustling with life.

The old men on the left side of the painting with consultation of the colophons of the paintings has been interpreted to depict a scene from the later end of Guo's life, depicting a farewell from a friend, likely Wen Yanbo, as recorded by poet Su Shi, as described by a commentary by Yen Yaohuan from the 14th century.

Compared with the painting Early Spring, the emphasis of distance, shading and lighting, utilizes dimension and texture are scene in both paintings.

Guo Xi utilizes in his paintings three types of distances: High Distance, a perspective from looking from bottom-up to the mountain, Level Distance, the foreground of the mountain, and Deep Distance, the distance background beyond the mountains.

== Provenance ==
The painting has gone centuries of ownership and viewership amongst the Imperial dynasties along with prominent artists as indicated by seals and colophons that annotate the original work.

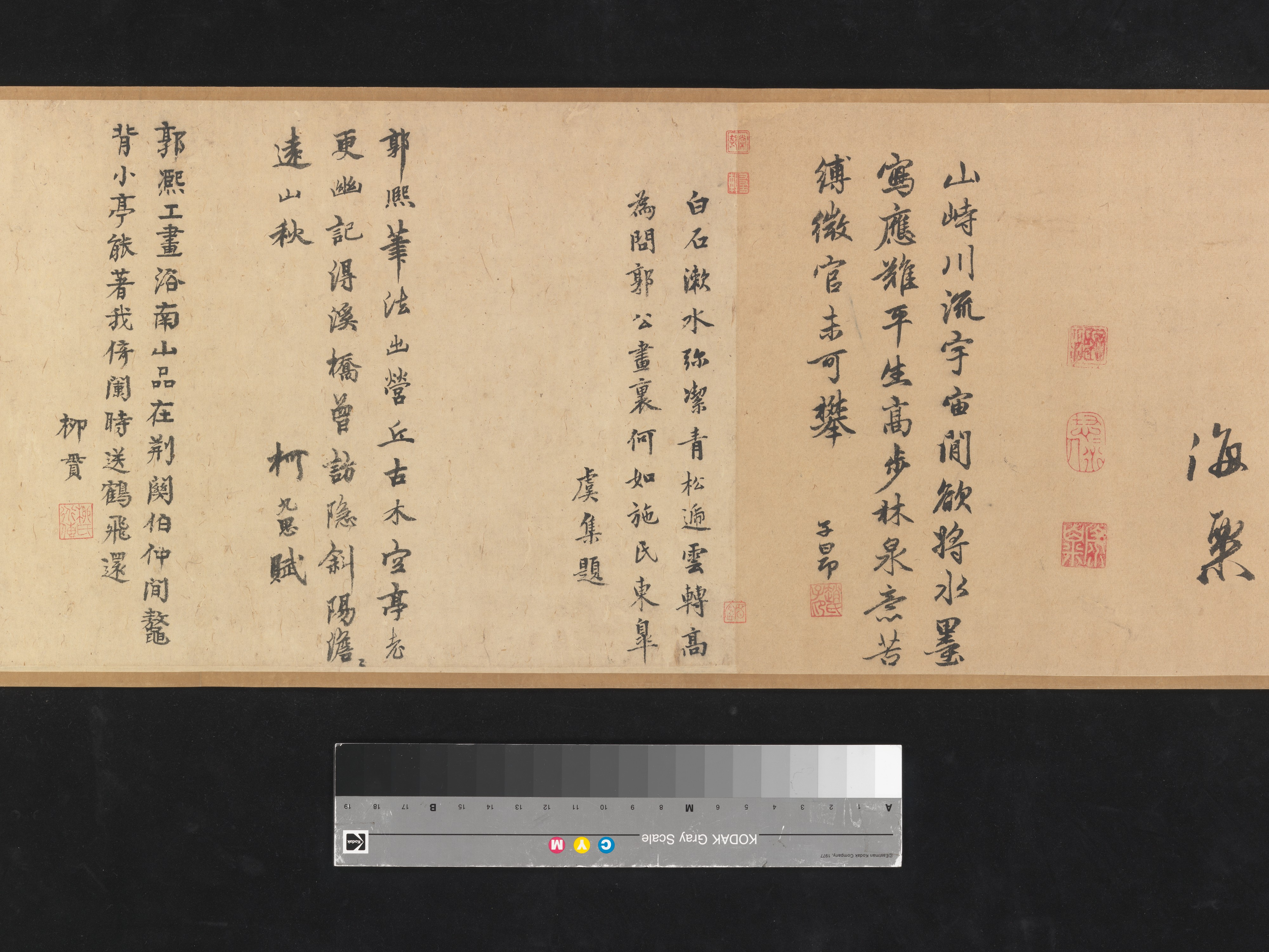
Colophone in the scroll, featuring an annotation by Zhao Mengfu.

The earliest owner was Emperor Huizong, with his seal the Xuanhe zhongbi (宣和中秘), indicating ownership in the palace libraries, but was subsequently withdrawn. In the subsequent decades, Zhao Mengfu viewed the work during the 13th to 14th century in Yuan-era Beijing (or Dadu). It was also appraised by the court of Tugh Temur, who like Huizong, was a prominent sponsor and appraiser of the arts via the Kuizhangge (Star of the Literature Pavilion).

After a century and a half of private ownership after leaving the Song court, the painting remained in private collections up til acquisition by the Qing Dynasty imperial collections with the seals of Qianlong, Jiaqing, and Xuantong.

After leaving the Qing Court, it was subsequently owned by Zhang Daqian, then subsequently "Gu Luofu", or John M. Crawford Jr. (1913–1988), a trustee of the Metropolitan Museum of Art, who bequeathed the painting to the museum.
