= 1020s in art =

- 1010s
- 1020s in art
- 1030s

Art timeline

The decade of the 1020s in art involved some significant events.

== Births ==
- 1020: Guo Xi – Chinese landscape painter who lived during the Northern Song dynasty (died 1090)

== Deaths ==
- 1028: Lin Bu - Chinese poet and calligrapher (born 967)
- 1027: Fujiwara no Yukinari - Japanese calligrapher (shodoka) during the Heian period (born 972)
- 1022: Ibn al-Bawwab – Arabic calligrapher and illuminator (b. unknown)
