= 1100s in art =

List of years in art	(table)
- … 1090; 1091; 1092; 1093; 1094; 1095; 1096; 1097; 1098; 1099; 1100; 1101; 1102; 1103; 1104; 1105; 1106; 1107; 1108; 1109; 1110 …
- Art; Archaeology; Architecture; Literature; Music; Philosophy; Science; +...

- 1090s
- 1100s in art
- 1110s
Other topics in 1100s:

The decade of the 1100s in art involved some significant events.

== Events ==
- c.1104: Production of Jingdezhen porcelain in China begins.

== Paintings ==
Master of Daphni, Midwives Bathing the New-born Christ

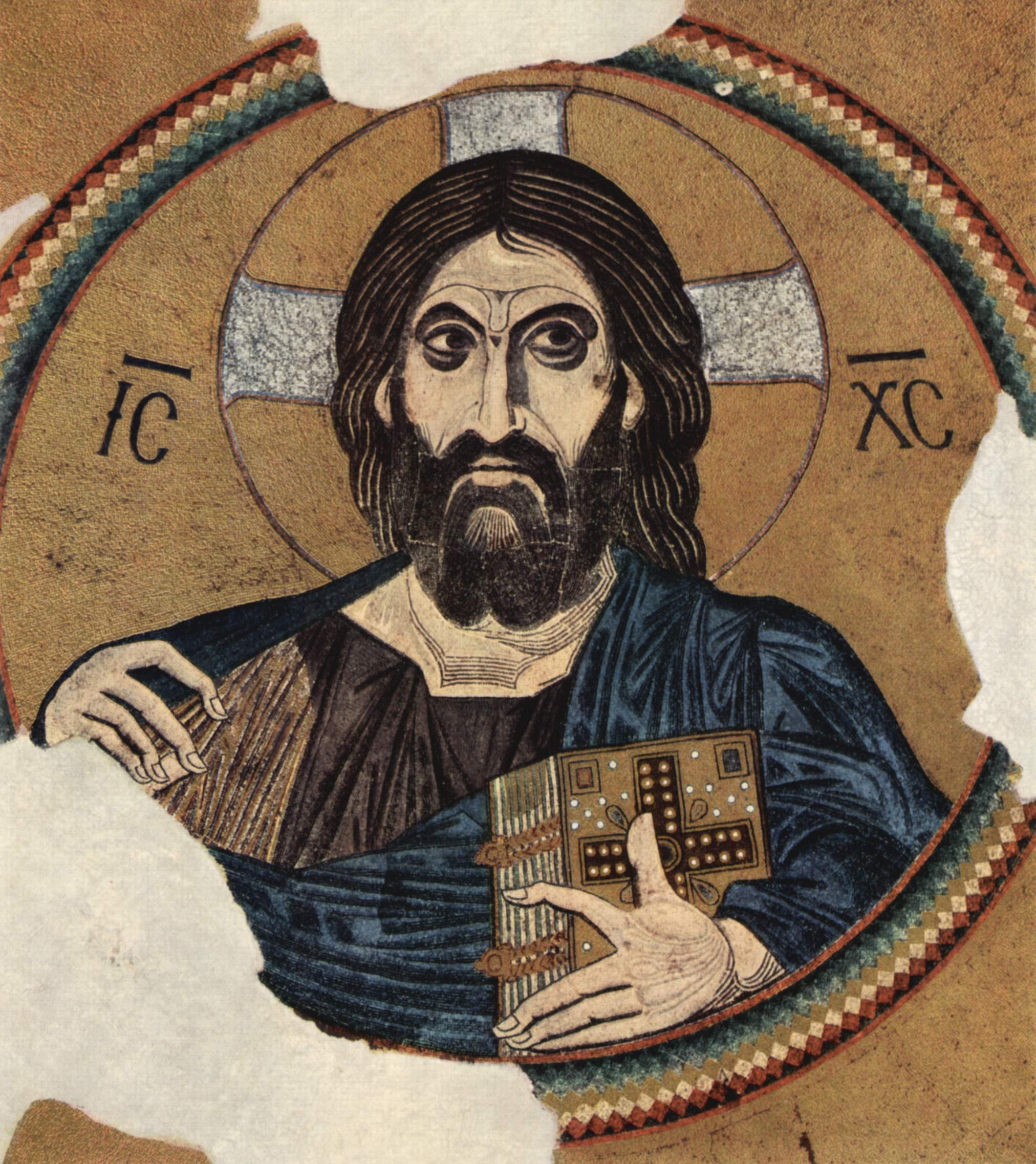
Master of Daphni, Christ Pantocrator

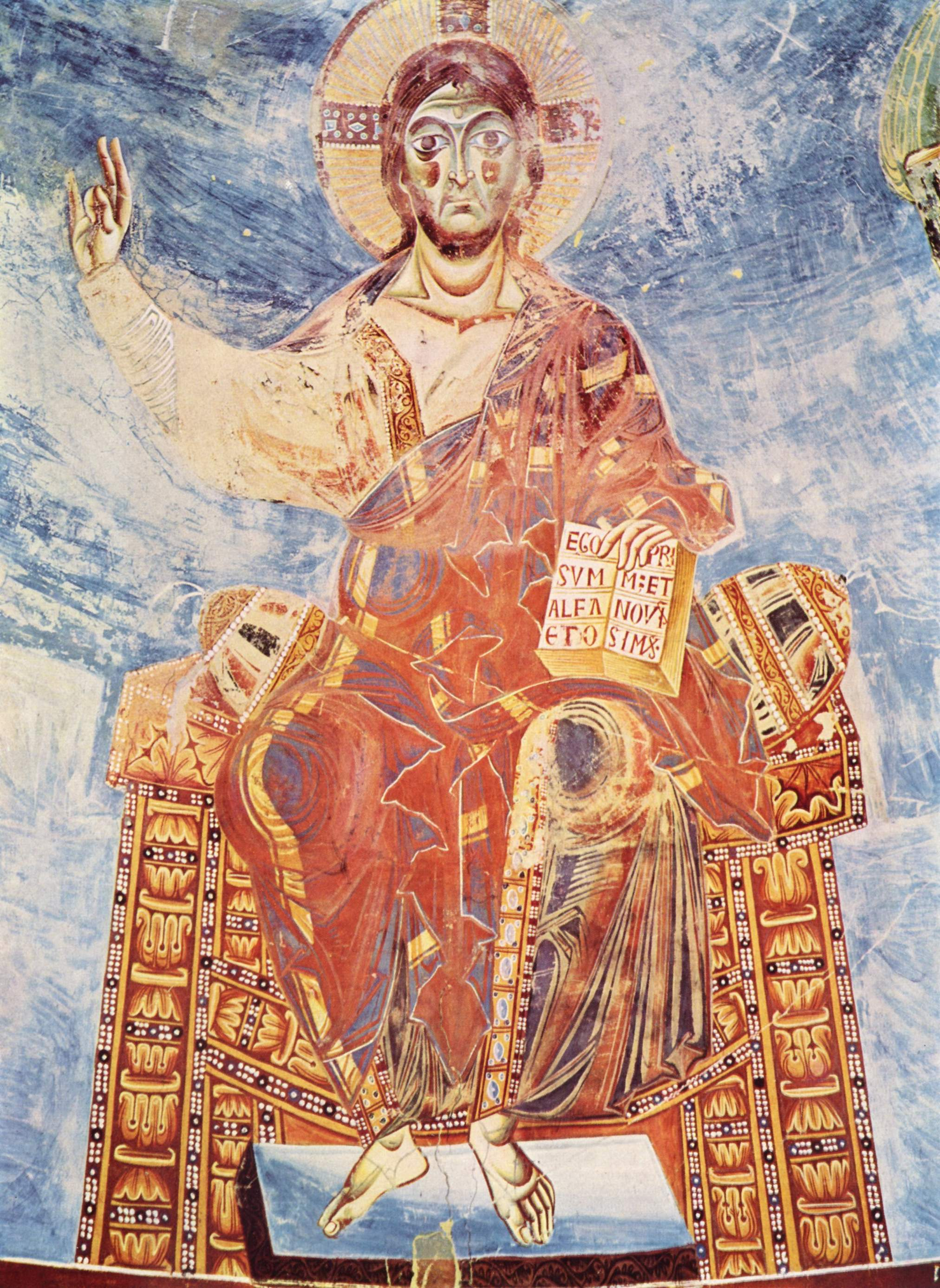
Byzantine Master, Christ Pantocrator

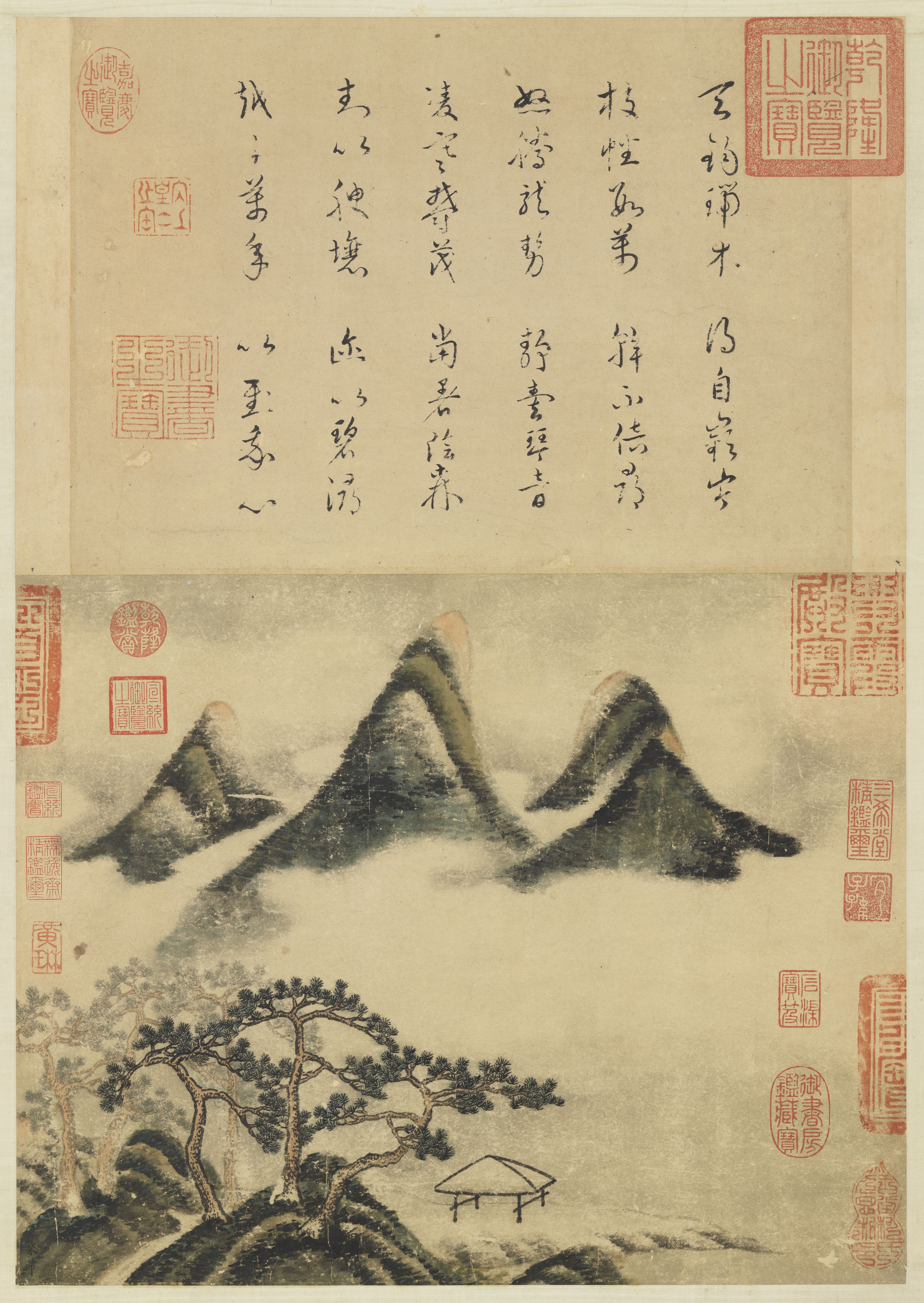
Mi Fu, Mountains and Pines in Spring (part)

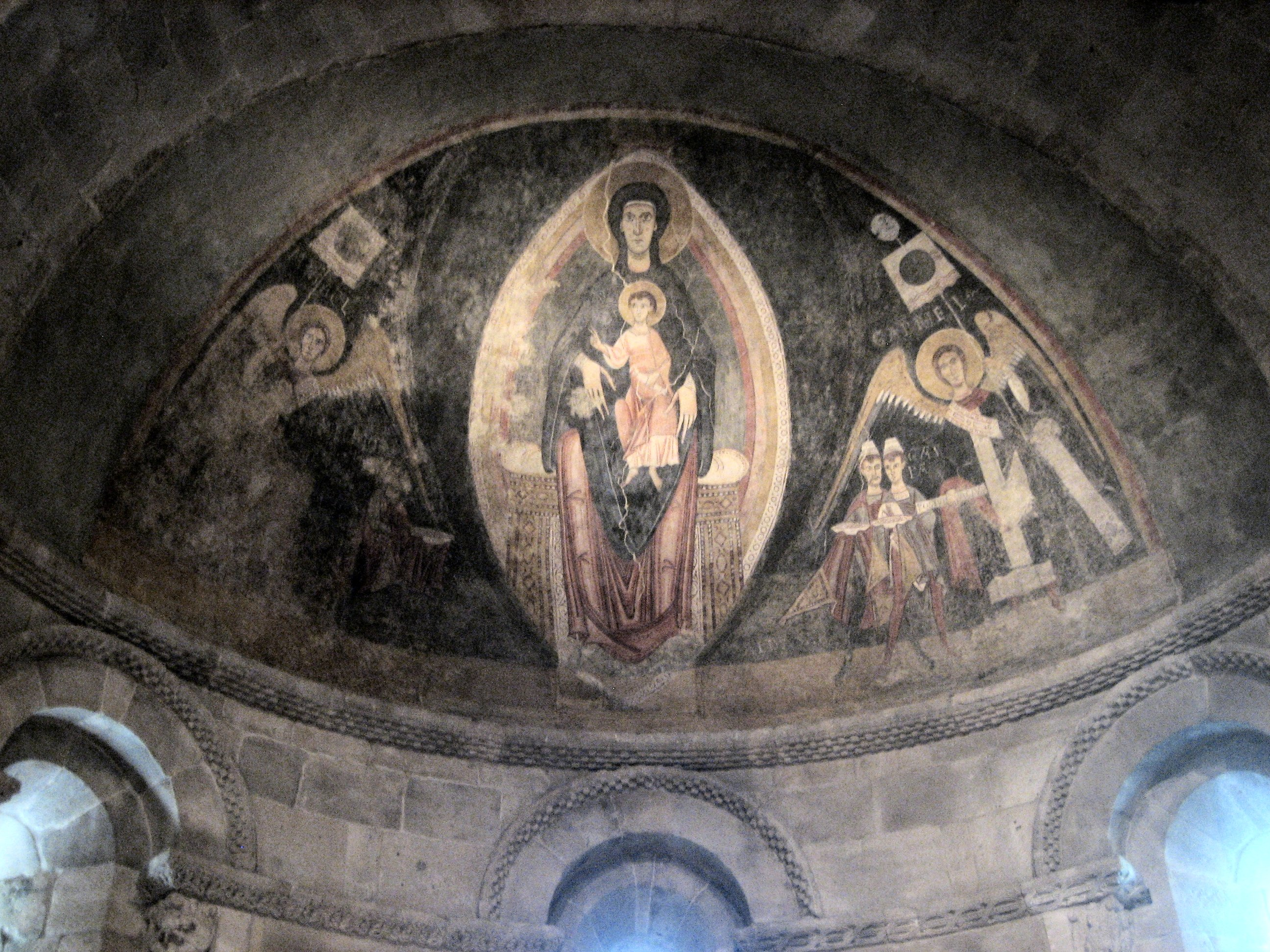
Master of Pedret, The Virgin and Child in Majesty and the Adoration of the Magi
- c.1100: The Master of Daphni completes the mosaics Midwives Bathing the New-born Christ and Christ Pantocrator in the katholikon at Daphni Monastery in Greece
- 1100: The Byzantine Master completes Christ Pantocrator in the church of Saint Michael the Archangel in the abbey of Sant'Angelo in Formis, Capua
- 1100: Mi Fu paints Mountains and Pines in Spring
- 1100: The Master of Pedret completes the Romanesque fresco The Virgin and Child in Majesty and the Adoration of the Magi in the apse of the Church of Saint Joan at Tredos in Catalonia (now in The Cloisters, New York City)

== Births ==
- 1103: Yue Fei - Chinese military general and calligrapher (died 1142)
- 1100: Li Di – Chinese imperial court painter (died 1197)

== Deaths ==
- 1107: Mi Fu – Chinese painter of misty landscapes, poet, and calligrapher during the Song Dynasty (born 1051)
- 1106: Li Gonglin – Chinese painter and civil officer in the Northern Song Dynasty (born 1049)
- 1105: Huang Tingjian – Chinese calligrapher, painter, and poet, one of the Four masters of the Song Dynasty (born 1045)
- 1101: Su Shi – Chinese artist of poetry, prose, calligraphy and painting (born 1037)
