= 1040s in art =

List of years in art	(table)
- … 1030; 1031; 1032; 1033; 1034; 1035; 1036; 1037; 1038; 1039; 1040; 1041; 1042; 1043; 1044; 1045; 1046; 1047; 1048; 1049; 1050 …
- Art; Archaeology; Architecture; Literature; Music; Philosophy; Science; +...

- 1030s
- 1040s in art
- 1050s
Other topics in 1040s:

The decade of the 1040s in art involved some significant events.

== Paintings ==
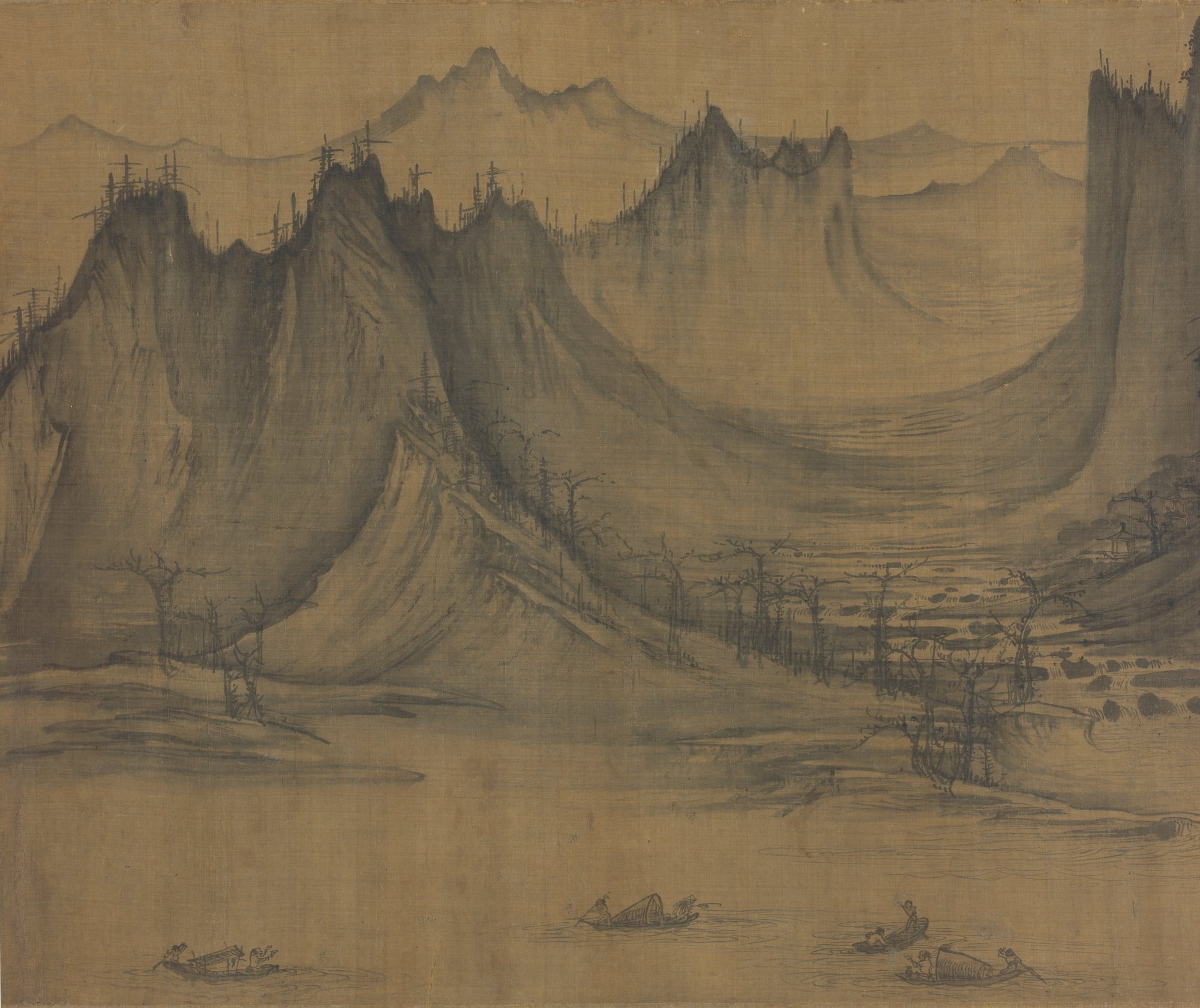
Xu Daoning, Fishermen's Evening Song

- Xu Daoning paints Fishermen's Evening Song 1049

== Births ==
- 1045: Huang Tingjian – Chinese calligrapher, painter, and poet, one of the Four Masters of the Song Dynasty (died 1105)
- 1047: Cai Jing – Chinese government official and calligrapher (died 1126)
- 1049: Li Gonglin – Chinese painter and civil officer in the Northern Song dynasty (died 1106)
