= 1010s in art =

List of years in art	(table)
- … 1000; 1001; 1002; 1003; 1004; 1005; 1006; 1007; 1008; 1009; 1010; 1011; 1012; 1013; 1014; 1015; 1016; 1017; 1018; 1019; 1020 …
- Art; Archaeology; Architecture; Literature; Music; Philosophy; Science; +...

- 1000s
- 1010s in art
- 1020s
Other topics in 1010s:

The decade of the 1010s involved some significant events in art.

== Works ==
- c.1015: Bernward Doors (cast bronze)

== Births ==
- 1019: Wen Tong – Chinese Northern Song painter famous for his ink bamboo paintings (died 1079)
- 1012: Cai Xiang – Chinese calligrapher, scholar, and poet (died 1067)
