= 1110s in art =

- 1100s
- 1110s in art
- 1120s

Art timeline

The decade of the 1110s in art involved some significant events.

== Works ==
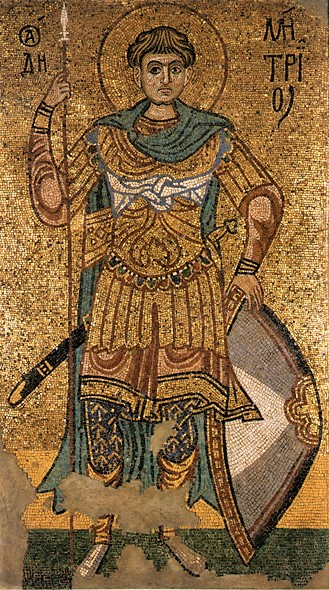
Unknown, Saint Demetrius of Thessaloniki, c. 1113

- 1110: Wiligelmo completes the Adam and Eve marble relief sculpture on Modena Cathedral
- 1113
  - Unknown artist completes a mosaic of Saint Demetrius of Thessaloniki for St. Michael's Golden-Domed Monastery in Kiev
  - Unknown artist(s) completes the Gloucester Candlestick
  - Wang Ximeng (aged 18) completes painting the scroll A Thousand Li of Rivers and Mountains
- 1118: Unknown artist completes the baptismal font at St Bartholomew's Church, Liège

== Deaths ==
- 1112 Benedict of Cagliari - Benedictine Bishop of Dolia, Sardinia
- 1119: Wang Ximeng - Chinese court painter of the Northern Song period (born 1096)

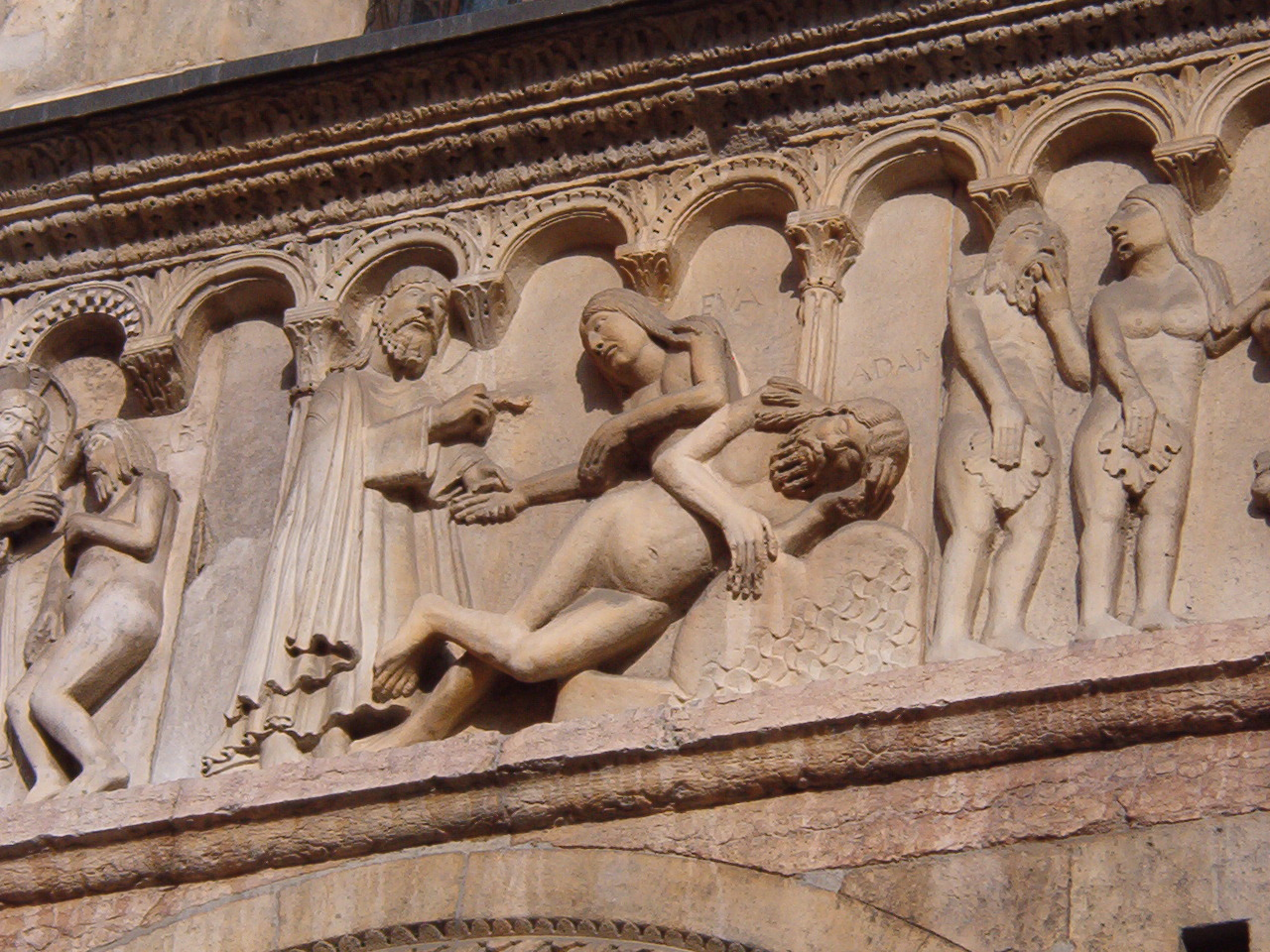
Wiligelmo, Adam and Eve, c. 1110
