= 1000s in art =

List of years in art	(table)
- … 990; 991; 992; 993; 994; 995; 996; 997; 998; 999; 1000; 1001; 1002; 1003; 1004; 1005; 1006; 1007; 1008; 1009; 1010 …
- Art; Archaeology; Architecture; Literature; Music; Philosophy; Science; +...

- 1000s in art
- 1010s
Other topics in 1000s:

The decade of the 1000s involved some significant events in art.

== Births ==
- 1000: Yi Yuanji – Chinese Northern Song painter famous for his realistic paintings of animals (died 1064)
