= 1030s in art =

- 1020s
- 1030s in art
- 1040s

Art timeline

The decade of the 1030s in art involved some significant events.

== Births ==
- 1037: Su Shi – Chinese artist of poetry, prose, calligraphy and painting (died 1101)
