= Zhou Jichang =

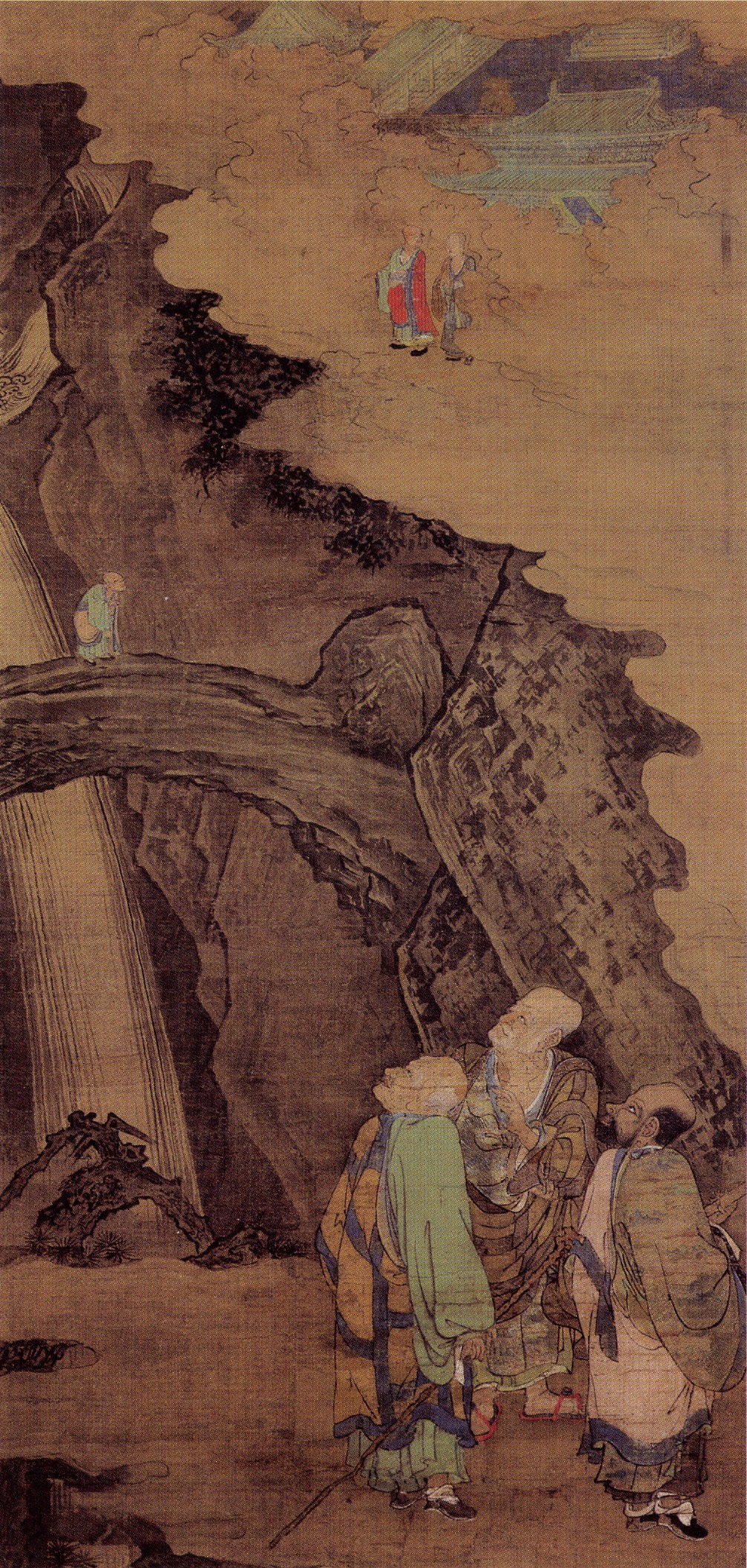
Chen Chun, Rock Bridge at Tiantai Mountain, Freer Gallery of Art, 1178

Zhou Jichang (Chinese: 周季常; pinyin: Zhōu Jìcháng; Wade–Giles: Chou Chi-ch'ang, Japanese: Shuu Kijou) (active in the late twelfth century) was a Chinese painter of the Song Dynasty (960 – 1279 AD). His artwork prominently featured central themes of Chinese Buddhism and Buddhist folklore.

His contemporary and associate Lin Tinggui collaborated with him on the completion of the artistic project known as the Five Hundred Luohan in 1178 AD.

In the United States, his artwork is housed in the Smithsonian's Freer Gallery of Art in Washington D.C., and the Museum of Fine Arts, Boston. Many of his other works are also located at Daitoku-ji Temple in Kyoto, Japan.

His most famous painting is Rock Bridge at Tiantai Mountain.

== See also ==
- Chinese painting
- List of Chinese painters
- Mahayana
- Guoqing Temple
- Song Dynasty
- Tiantai
- Lin Tinggui
- Zhiyi
