= Yang Buzhi =

Yang Buzhi (1098–1167) was born in Qingjiang (modern Huai'an), Jiangxi Province, in China.

He is regarded as a master of ink paintings of plum blossoms in the Song dynasty, and developed techniques which influenced later painters. He "resolved the depiction of flowering plum into a linear system built from brushstrokes and structures adapted from calligraphy".

Four Stages of Blossoming Plum, circa 1165, is the only surviving work that can be attributed to him with certainty.
