= Cui Bai =

Chinese painter

崔白（Cui Bai）
- Born: 11th century (Song Dynasty)
- Occupation: painter

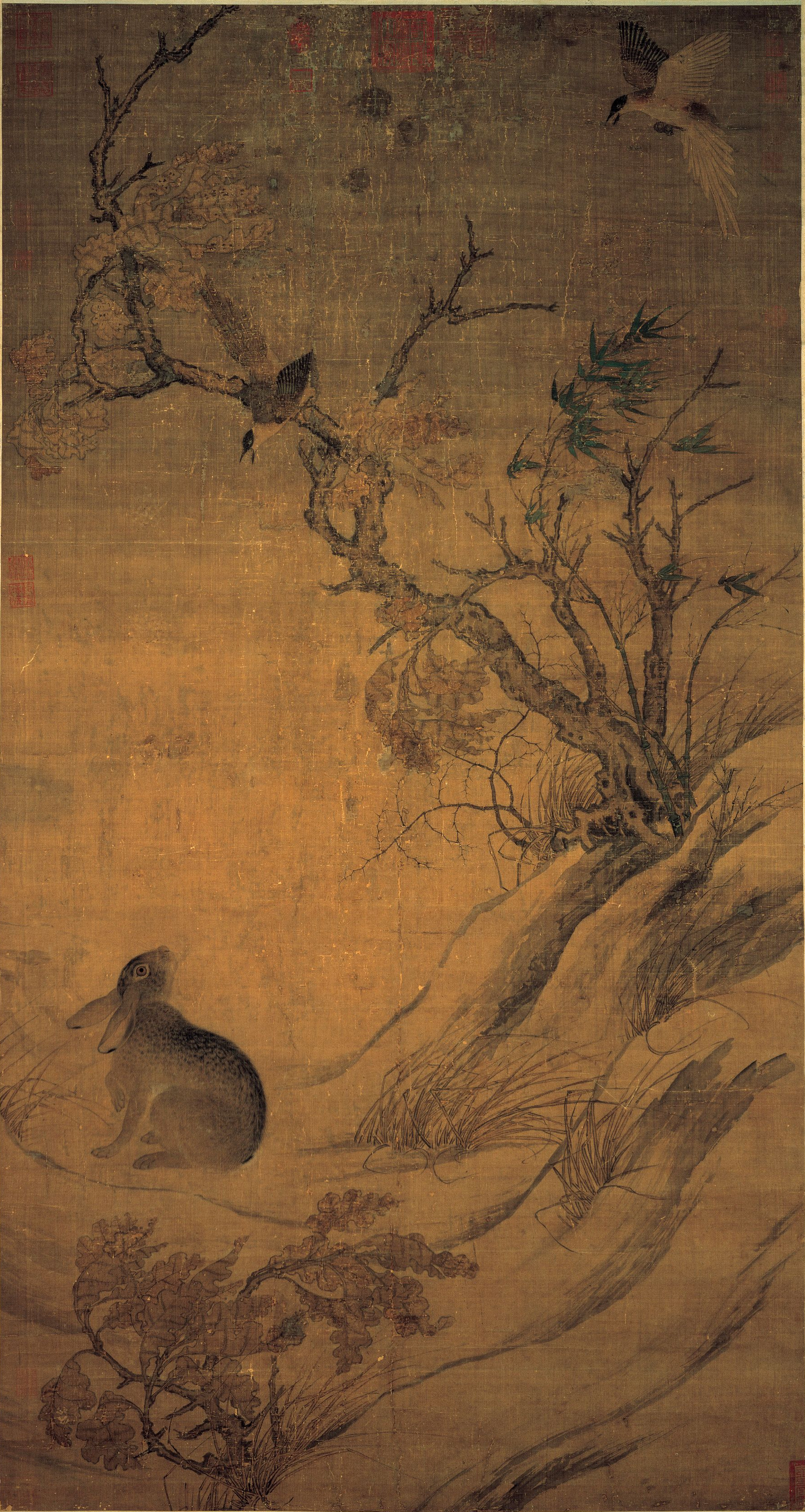
Magpies and Hare

Cui Bai (Chinese: 崔白; pinyin: Cuī Bái; Wade–Giles: Ts'ui Po, also known as Cui Bo, style name Zixi (子西)) (fl. 1050–1080) was a prominent Chinese painter of the Northern Song Dynasty (960–1279). A native of Anhui Province, Cui was best known for paintings of animals and plants. At some point during his life, he traveled to the capital of Kaifeng to seek employment as a court artist, and was accepted by Emperor Shenzong of Song, who admired his works. He became a renowned artist of Shenzong's court, but gained an awkward reputation for his often eccentric behavior.

Cui Bai is today known for two paintings depicting magpies and sparrows respectively. Magpies and Hare, also known as "Double Happiness", because "two magpies" in Mandarin Chinese is pronounced the same as "two happinesses", is held in the National Palace Museum, Taipei. The painting would have been meant as a gift to someone to congratulate them in some way, most likely for a wedding. Wintery Sparrow, a large handscroll, is kept in the Palace Museum in Beijing.

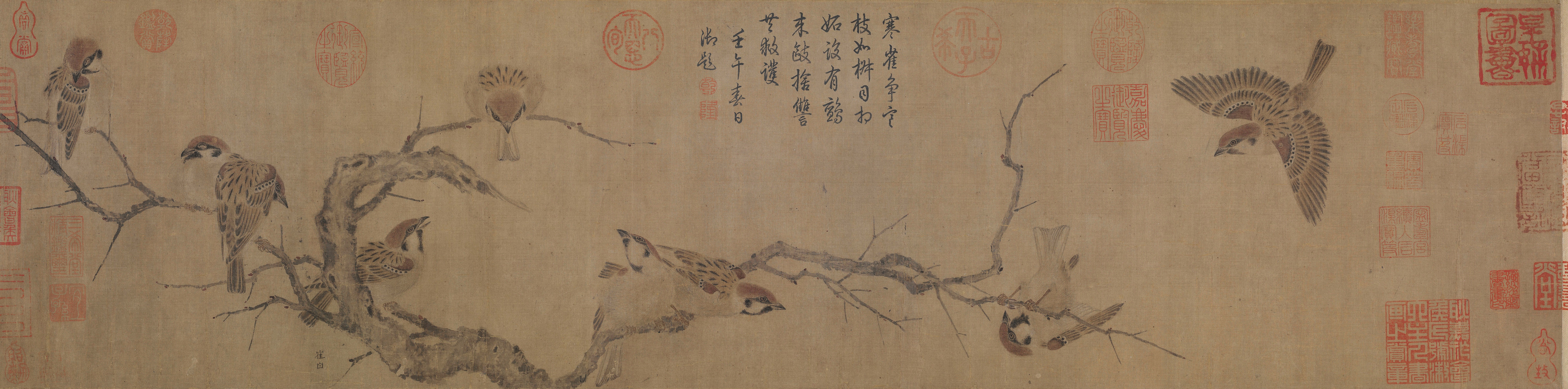
Wintery Sparrow

== See also ==
- Culture of the Song Dynasty
