= Early Spring (painting) =

Chinese artwork

- Traditional Chinese: 早春圖
- Simplified Chinese: 早春图
Transcriptions
Standard Mandarin
- Hanyu Pinyin: zǎo chūn tú

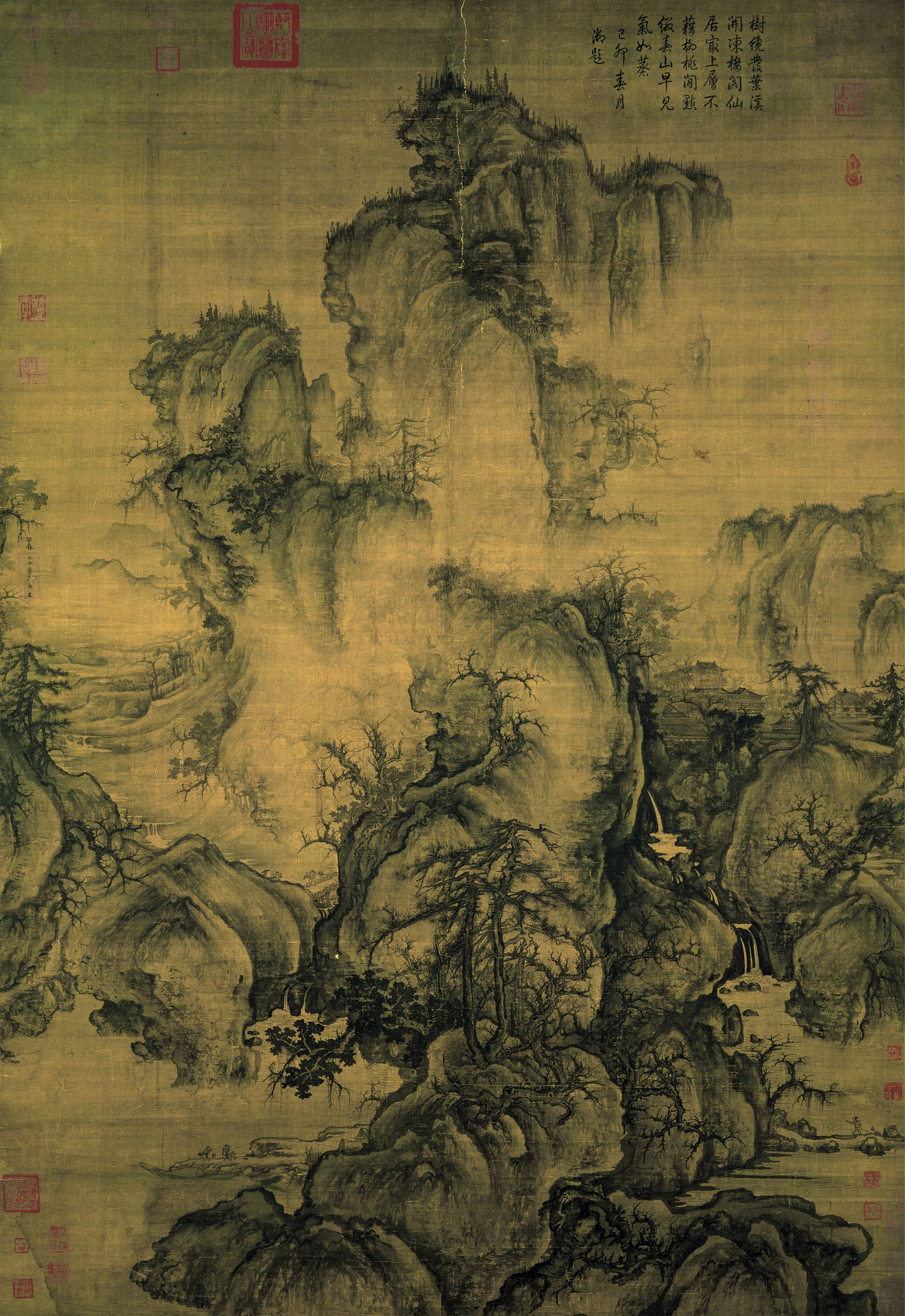
Early Spring

Early Spring is a hanging scroll painting by Guo Xi. Completed in 1072, it is one of the most famous works of Chinese art from the Song dynasty. The work demonstrates his innovative techniques for producing multiple perspectives which he called "the angle of totality." The painting is a type of scroll painting which is called a shan shui painting. The poem in the upper right corner was added in 1759 by the Qianlong Emperor. It reads:

Chinese	Pinyin	English
樹纔發葉溪開凍	shù cái fā yè xī kāidòng	The trees are just beginning to sprout leaves; the frozen brook begins to melt.
樓閣仙居最上層	lóugé xiānjū zuì shàngcéng	A building is placed on the highest ground, where the immortals reside.
不藉柳桃閒點綴	bù jiè liǔ táo jiàn diǎnzhuì	There is nothing between the willow and peach trees to clutter up the scene.
春山早見氣如蒸	chūnshān zǎo jiàn qì rú zhēng	Steam-like mist can be seen early in the morning on the springtime mountain.
己卯春月	jǐ mǎo chūnyuè	(Year of) Yin Earth Rabbit (1759)
御題	yùtí	Composed by the royal hand (of the Qianlong Emperor)

== See also ==
- Culture of the Song dynasty
