= Lin Tinggui =

Chinese name
- Chinese: 林庭珪
Transcriptions
Standard Mandarin
- Hanyu Pinyin: Lín Tíngguī
- Bopomofo: ㄌㄧㄣˊ ㄊㄧㄥˊ ㄍㄨㄟ
- Wade–Giles: Lin^{2} T‘ing^{2}-kuei^{1}
- IPA: [lǐn tʰǐŋ.kwéɪ]
Yue: Cantonese
- Yale Romanization: Làhm Tìhnggwāi
- Jyutping: Lam^{4} Ting^{4}-gwai^{1}
- IPA: [lɐm˩ tʰɪŋ˩.kʷɐj˥]

Japanese name
- Kanji: 林 庭珪
- Kana: りん ていけい
Transcriptions
- Romanization: Rin Teikei

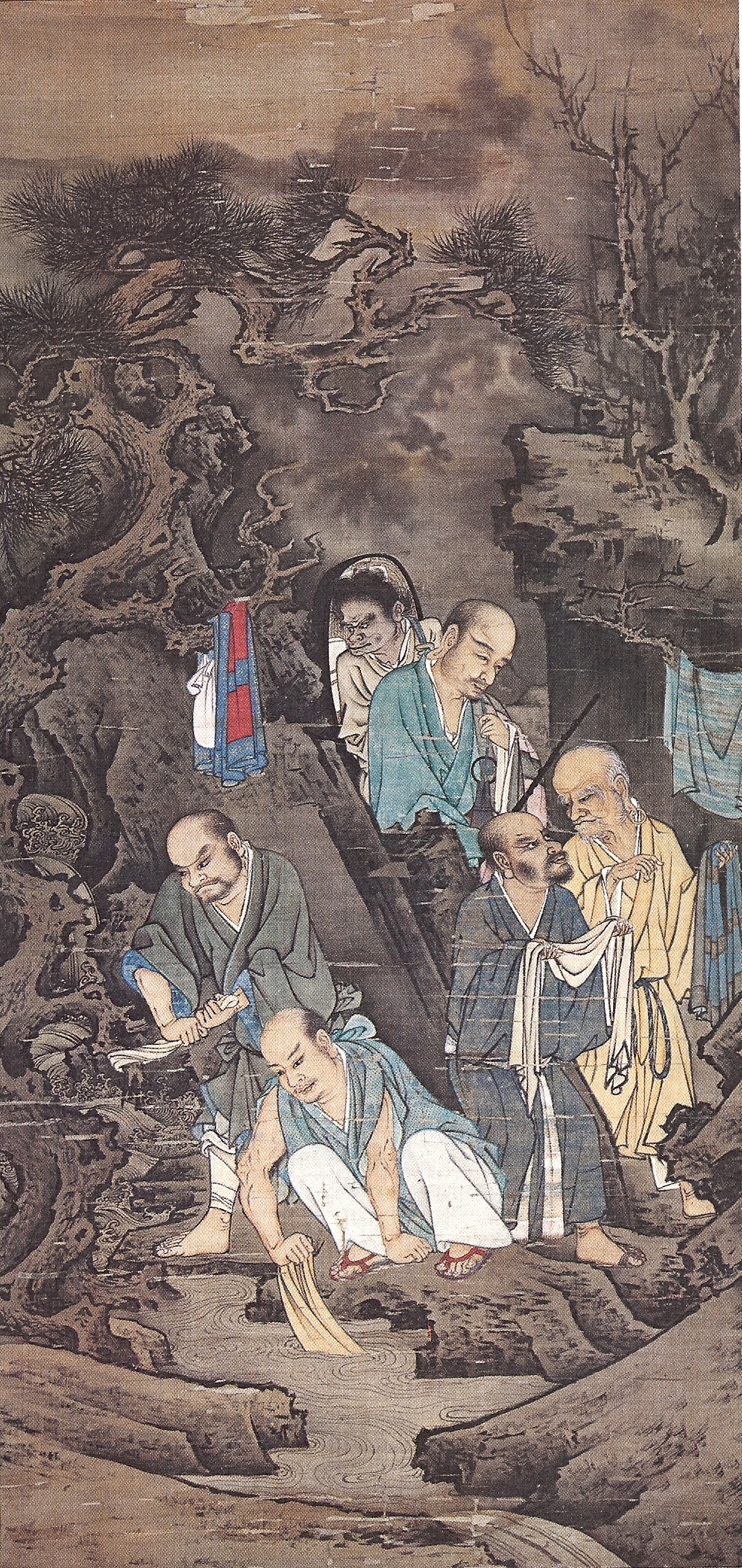
Luohan Laundering, by Lin Tinggui, 1178 AD

Lin Tinggui (Chinese: 林庭珪; pinyin: Lín Tíngguī; Wade–Giles: Lin T‘ing-kuei; fl. circa 1174–1189) (Japanese: Rin Teikei) was a Chinese painter of the Southern Song dynasty (1127–1279 AD). His artwork was greatly influenced by themes of Chinese Buddhism.

== The Five Hundred Luohan ==
Lin Tinggui is best known for taking part alongside Zhou Jichang (Japanese: Shuu Kijou) in the completion of the Five Hundred Luohan (Chinese: Wubai Luohan), a set of 100 paintings commissioned as a gift to a Buddhist temple in 1175 by a Chinese Buddhist abbot. This artistic project in honor of the luohan was completed three years later in 1178.

In Chinese Buddhist folklore, it was said that five hundred luohan (Buddhist saints) inhabited a peak beyond the stone bridge of Mount Tiantai located at Jiuhuashan, modern-day Qingyang County, Anhui province, China. This belief was either formed from an older Daoist belief that the site was home to immortals, or from knowledge of Buddhist legend from India, specifically the belief of five hundred arhats living on Mt. Buddhavanagiri near Rajagrha. It was this belief that provided the central theme of Lin Tinggui and Zhou Jichang's artwork.

== The Five Hundred Luohan outside of China ==
During the 13th century, the set of paintings completed by Lin Tinggui and Zhou Jichang were imported to Japan and wound up as the property of Jufuku-ji Temple in Kamakura, Kanagawa, Japan. Hand-painted copies of the scrolls were made in 1368 by the Japanese painter-priest Minchou (1351 - 1431 AD) for the Buddhist temples Engaku-ji and Toufuku-ji in Kamakura. The painting set was moved by the Hojo warrior family at a later date to Sounji, and in the 16th century they were taken from eastern Japan by the late Sengoku period warlord Toyotomi Hideyoshi as spoils of war. He placed this precious set of 100 paintings in the Hōkō-ji Temple, near Hamamatsu, Shizuoka, Japan. The painting set was then finally placed at the Rinzai Buddhist Daitoku-ji Temple in Kyoto, Japan, in its subtemple of Soken'in, which Hideyoshi had sponsored in honor of his predecessor, Oda Nobunaga. In 1894, the temple was in need of funds for repair, and so auctioned forty-four of the 100 painted scrolls in Boston. Ten of these paintings were sold by the Japanese during the exhibit (while the rest returned to Kyoto), while the painting Luohan Laundering by Lin Tinggui was given as a gift to the tour's American organizer. The latter then sold the painting in 1902 to Charles Lang Freer, and is now housed in the Freer Gallery of Art, part of the Smithsonian Museum in Washington, D.C.

In this famous painting of Lin Tinggui, Luohan Laundering (1178), five brightly colored Luohan and one attendant are seen washing their clothes and hanging them out to dry by a gushing stream moving through a dismally brown-shaded and thick-wooded landscape. On the lower right-hand corner of the painting, almost invisible to the naked eye, is a small signature penned in gold by Lin Tinggui. The Freer Gallery also has a painting from the set done by Zhou Jichang, called Rock Bridge at Tiantai Mountain.

Several other works in the Five Hundred Luohan set by Lin Tinggui and Zhou Jichang alike are at the Museum of Fine Arts, Boston.

== See also ==
- Culture of the Song dynasty
- Chinese painting
- List of Chinese painters
