= Mi Fu =

Chinese artist (1051–1107)

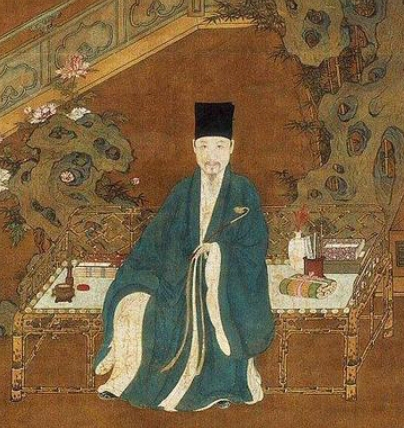
- Mi Fu as depicted in a 1107 painting by Chao Buzhi

Chinese name
- Chinese: 米芾
- Traditional Chinese: 米芾
- Simplified Chinese: 米芾
Transcriptions
Standard Mandarin
- Hanyu Pinyin: Mǐ Fú
- Wade–Giles: Mi Fu
Yue: Cantonese
- Jyutping: Mei^{5} Fat^{1}
Middle Chinese
- Middle Chinese: Miei^{B} Pjwǝt

Korean name
- Hangul: 미불
Transcriptions
- McCune–Reischauer: Mi Bul

Japanese name
- Hiragana: べいふつ
Transcriptions
- Romanization: Bei Futsu

Mi Fu (Chinese: 米芾; 1051–1107) was a Chinese painter, poet, calligrapher and art theorist of the early Song dynasty. Born in Taiyuan, he was known for his landscape painting technique, later referred to as "Mi Dots", which involved the use of broad, wet ink dots applied with a flat brush. Mi Fu's poetry was influenced by Li Bai, while his calligraphy drew inspiration from Wang Xizhi.

Mi Fu is commonly identified in art historical scholarship by art historians as one of the four major calligraphers of the Song Dynasty, along with Su Shi, Huang Tingjian and Cai Xiang. His major works include Zhang Jiming Tie (張季明帖), Li Taishi Tie (李太師帖), Zijin Yan Tie (紫金研帖) and Danmo Qiushan Shitie (淡墨秋山詩帖). Among these, Shu Su Tie (蜀素帖), also known as Nigu Shitie (擬古詩帖), is considered an example of running script calligraphy. Mi Fu described his calligraphy as "a collection of ancient characters", reflecting its roots in traditional styles; however, his work also incorporates elements that diverged from earlier conventions. His artistic style was later adopted and interpreted by his son, Mi Youren.

Beyond his artistic achievements, Mi Fu was also known for having a distinctive personality and meticulous approach to his practice.

== Biography ==
Some historical sources trace Mi Fu's ancestry to "Mi Xin", a Later Zhou and Early Song Dynasty general associated with the Kumo Xi, a tribe believed to have descended from the Xianbei. Some scholars suggest his family may have had distant Sogdian heritage. The surname "Mi" may have Sogdian origins, coinciding with a period when Sogdian merchants and settlers formed communities within China.

Mi Fu showed an early interest in arts and letters. His mother worked as a midwife and later as a wet nurse, looking after Emperor Shenzong. This connection led Mi Fu to spend part of his early life in the royal court.

He began his civil service career as a Reviser of Books in the imperial library. He then served in three posts outside the capital of Kaifeng, in Henan province. In 1103, he was appointed Doctor of Philosophy and served briefly as the Military Governor of Wuwei in Anhui province.

In 1104, he returned to the capital to serve as Professor of Painting and Calligraphy, and later Secretary to the Board of Rites. His final post was as Military Governor of Huaiyang.

Mi Fu collected old writings and paintings as his family wealth diminished. His collection grew in value, partly through inheritance. It was divided into two parts: one kept secret and shown only to a select few, and another displayed to guests.

In his later years, Mi Fu became fond of the Helin Temple (鶴林寺) on Mount Huaguo (花果山) in Jiangsu and requested to be buried at its gate. Although the temple no longer exists, his grave remains.

Mi Fu had five sons, of whom only two survived infancy, and eight daughters. His eldest son, Mi Youren, also became a Chinese artist.

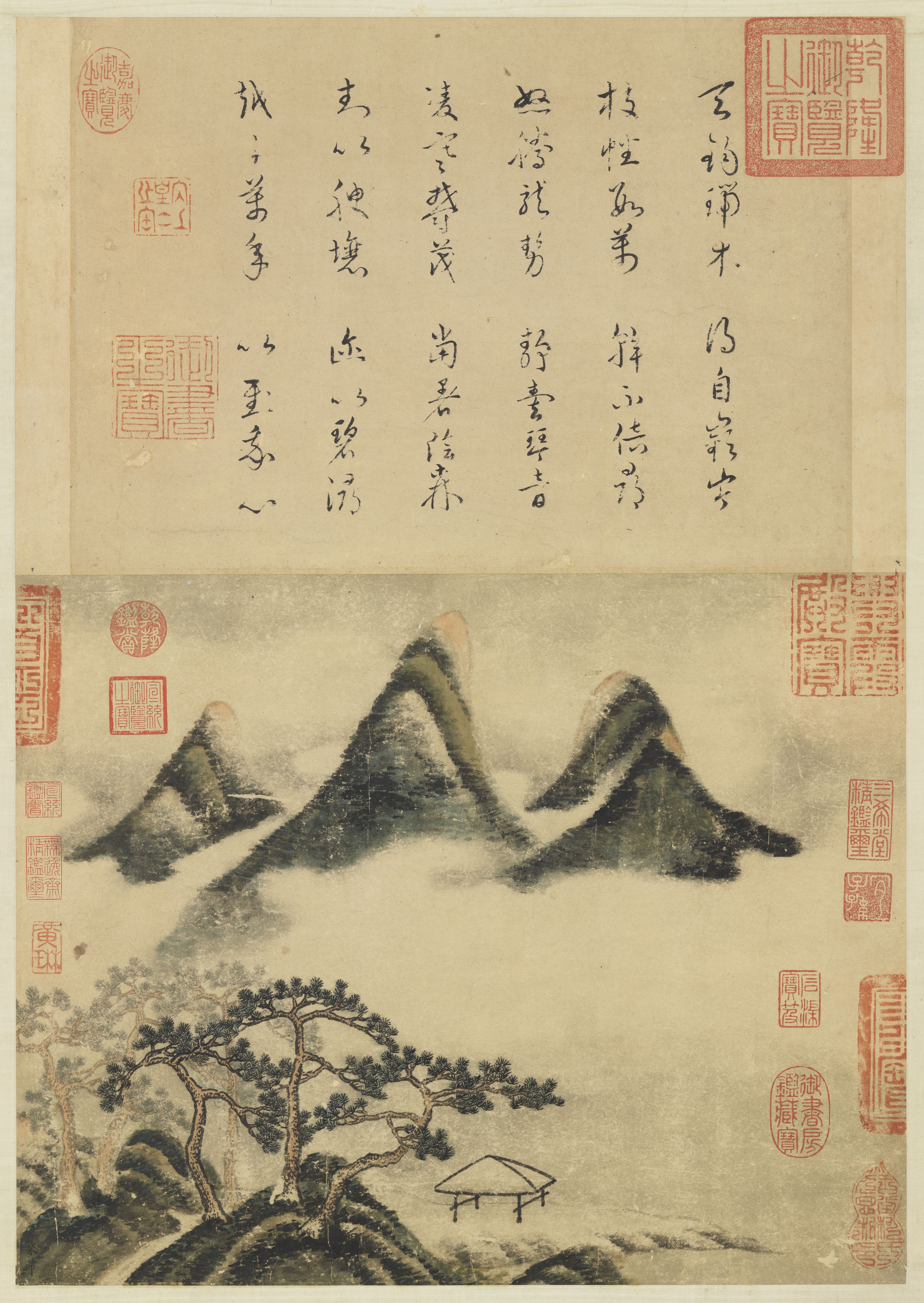
Mountains and Pines in Spring (detail), National Palace Museum (Taipei)

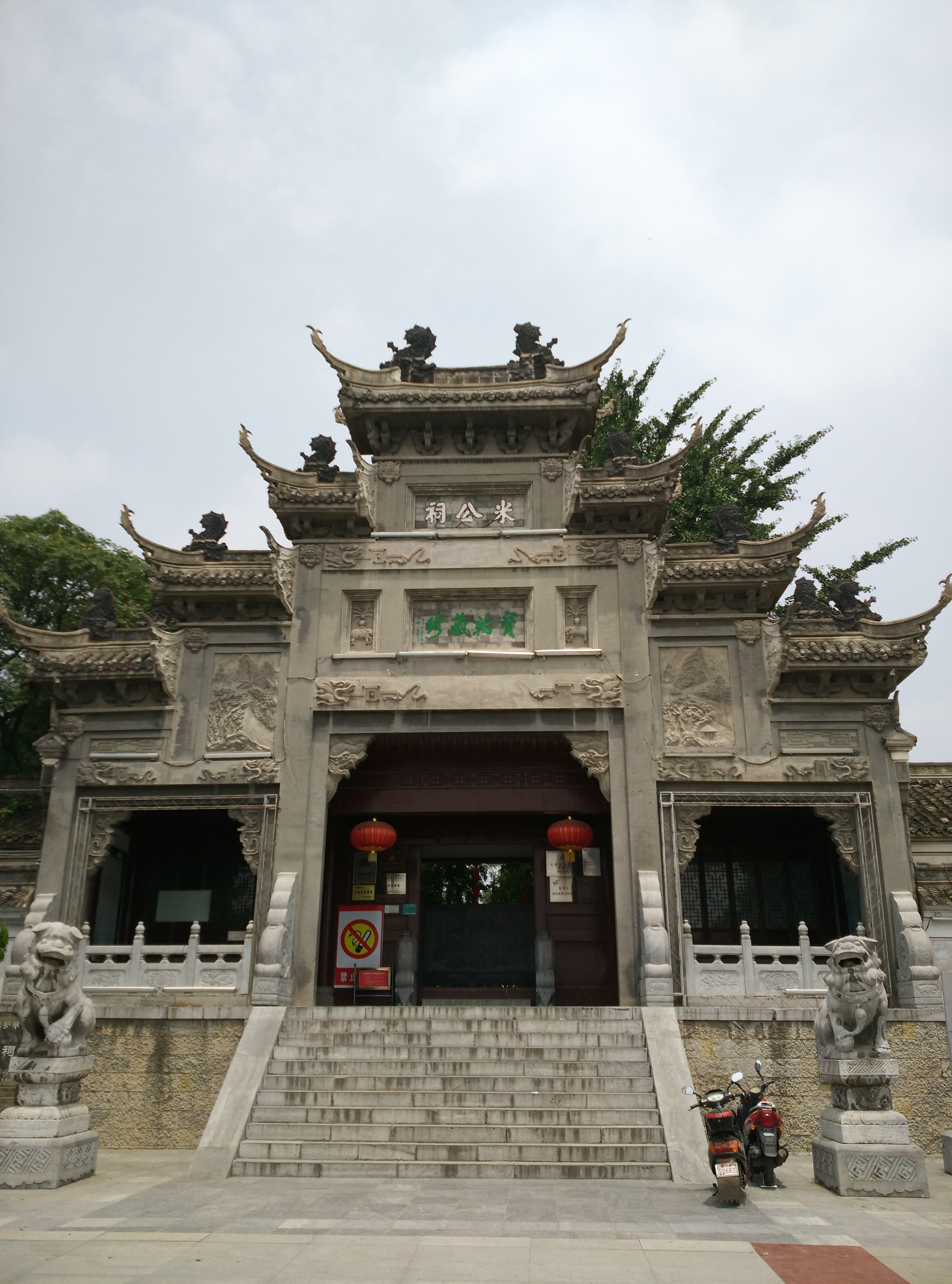
Mi Fu Memorial Temple in Xiangyang

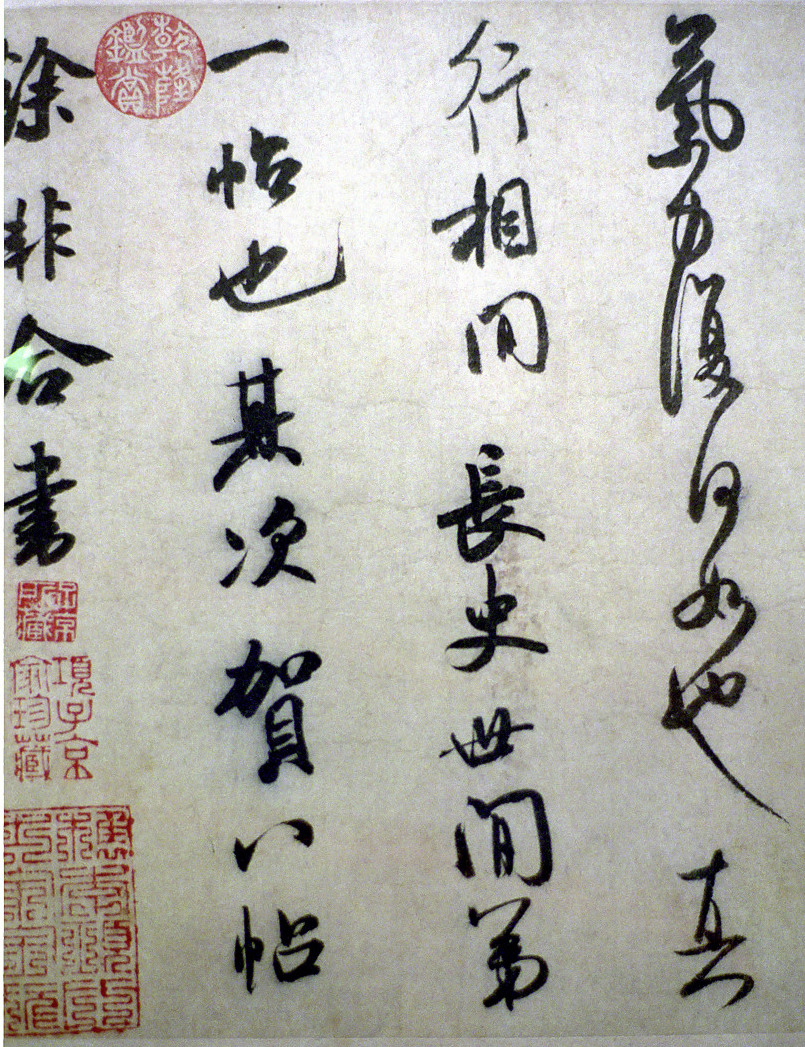
Calligraphy by Mi Fu, ink on paper, collection of the Tokyo National Museum

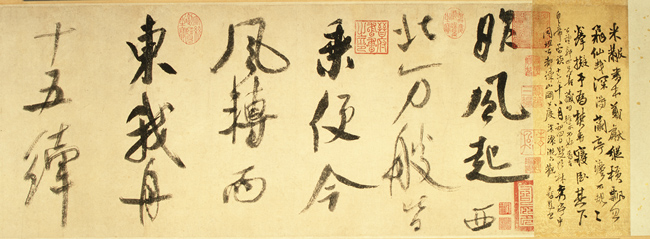
Poems in Wuzi's Boat (Part), ink on paper, private collection in New York

== Historical background ==
Mi Fu's views, which at times diverged from official opinion, are documented in his writings. His notes on painting and calligraphy are regarded by art historians as valuable sources of insight into Song dynasty aesthetics.

== Art ==
Mi Fu is often associated with the Southern School of landscape painting, though the extent of his direct contributions remains a subject of debate. While several works are attributed to him, some scholars question their authenticity. Although his involvement in landscape painting is recognized, Mi Fu is chiefly remembered for his calligraphy and his influence as an art critic and writer.

For Mi Fu, writing and calligraphy were closely associated with the composition of poetry and sketching. He believed that mental alertness for these activities was best attained through the enjoyment of wine. Su Shi admired Mi Fu, describing his brush as being like a sharp sword handled skillfully or a bow capable of shooting an arrow a thousand li.

Mi Fu's Huashi ("History of Painting") provides guidance on the proper methods for collecting, preserving, cleaning, and mounting paintings.

== See also ==
- Chinese art
- Chinese painting
- Culture of the Song dynasty
- History of Chinese art

== General references ==
- Barnhart, R. M. et al. (1997). Three Thousand years of Chinese Painting. New Haven, Conn.: Yale University Press. ISBN 0-300-07013-6. p. 373.
- Rhonda and Jeffrey Cooper (1997). Masterpieces of Chinese Art. Todtri Productions. ISBN 1-57717-060-1. p. 76.
- Xiao, Yanyi, "Mi Fu". Encyclopedia of China (Arts Edition), 1st ed.
