= Xu Daoning =

Chinese painter

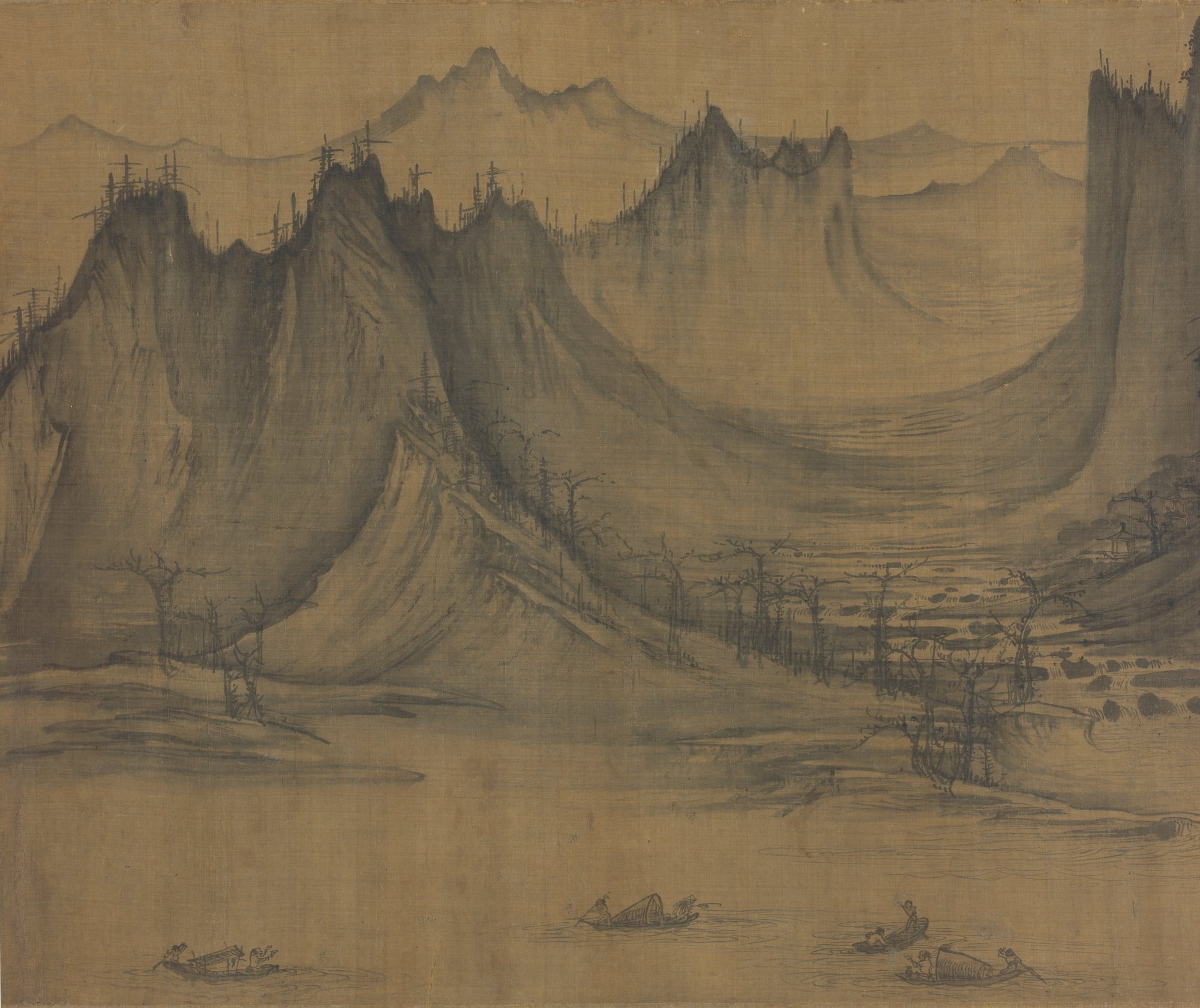
Fishermen's Evening Song (detail), one of Xu Daoning's most famous paintings, located in the Nelson-Atkins Museum in Kansas City, Missouri

Xu Daoning (simplified Chinese: 许道宁; traditional Chinese: 許道寧; pinyin: Xǔ Dàoníng; Wade–Giles: Hsü Tao-ning) (c. 970–1051/53) was a Chinese painter of the Northern Song Dynasty (960–1279) from Chang'an (now Xi'an) or Hejian (河间 now Hebei). He started out life by selling medicine prescriptions in Kaifeng. While selling prescriptions, he also began painting nature scenes in the style of Li Cheng. After gaining popularity he took up painting murals for Chinese nobles. His most notable work is Fishermen's Evening Song (ca. 1049).

== See also ==
- Culture of the Song Dynasty
