= Fujiwara no Sadazane =

Japanese calligrapher

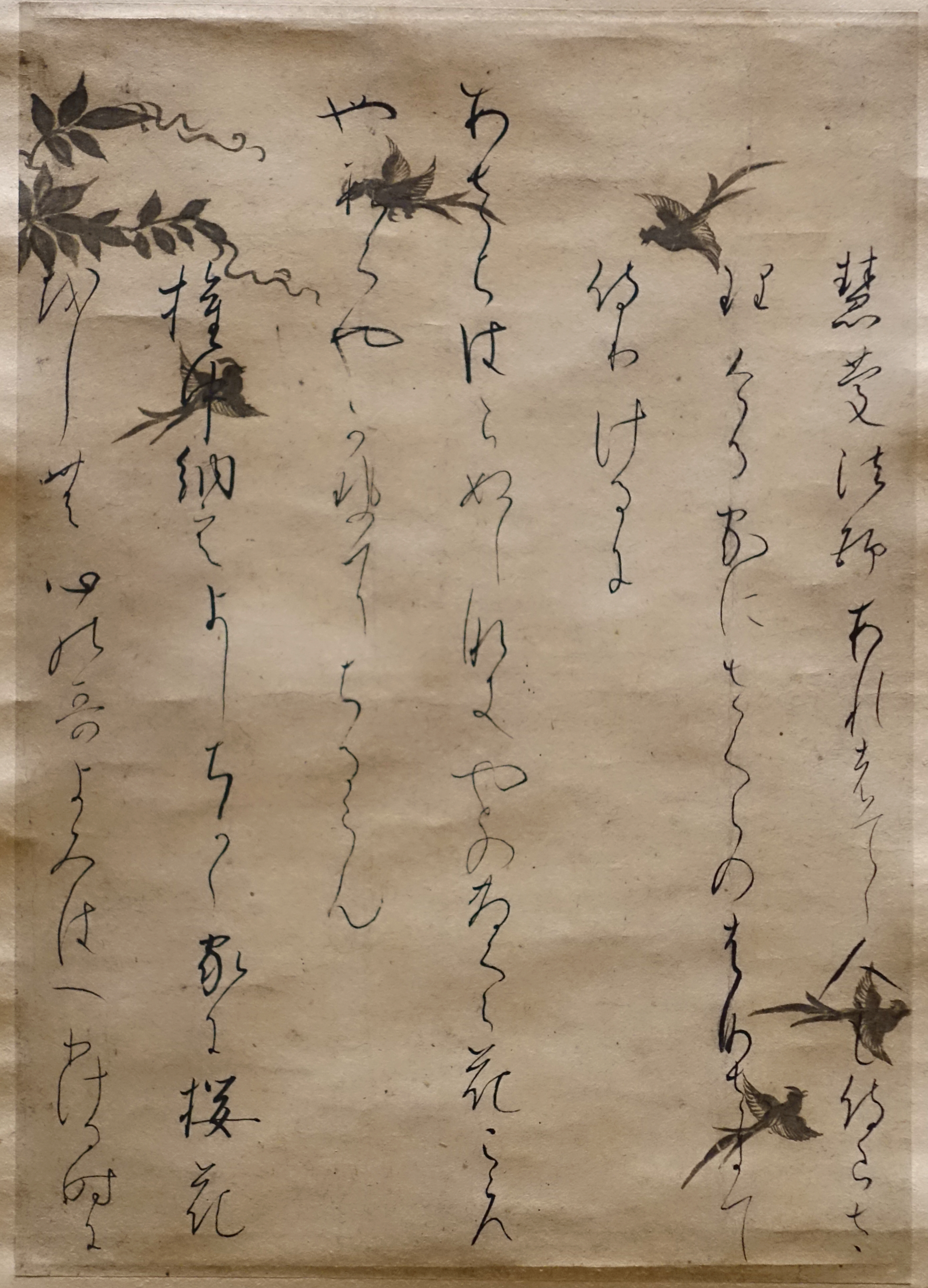
Shui sho poetry anthology segment by Fujiwara no Sadazane

Fujiwara no Sadazane (藤原定実; 1076-1120) was a Japanese calligrapher during the Heian period. He was the son of Fujiwara no Korefusa (藤原伊房; 1030-1096), the Provisional Middle Counselor (Gon Chūnagon). He was also a descendant of Fujiwara no Yukinari.

He held the court rank of Junior Fourth Rank, Upper Grade, and served as the Director of the Right Capital Office (Ukyō no Daibu). He was the fourth head of the Sesonji family.

== Biography ==
At the beginning of the Go-Sanjō era, he was awarded court rank. In 1077, during the reign of Emperor Shirakawa, he was appointed chamberlain. Around 1081, he was appointed Lesser General of the Left Division of Inner Palace Guards, a position he held until approximately 1086, he may have been relieved of the post upon his promotion to Junior Fourth Rank, Lower Grade.

In 1090, he was appointed Governor of Yamashiro Province, and in 1097 he was promoted to Junior Fourth Rank, Upper Grade. His career advancement was then adversely affected by the dismissal of his father, Refusa, who had risen to the rank of Provisional Middle Counselor but was removed from office in 1094, after being reprimanded for engaging in private trade. As a result, he received no further significant promotions thereafter. Sedanze subsequently served as governor of Yamashiro for nearly two decades.

He was active in calligraphic and literary pursuits. He served as the fair-copying calligrapher for a memorial submitted by the Minister of the Right, Fujiwara no Tadamichi, in 1102, as well as for the dedicatory prayer composed for the completion and consecration ceremony of Sonshō-ji Temple. In 1108, he is recorded as having written the shikishigata inscriptions for the folding screens used at the Daijosai ceremony of Emperor Toba.

== Lineage ==
Sadazane was the son of and

Sadazane's place in a Sesonji lineage of calligraphers provides a context for his life and work:

- Fujiwara no Yukinari (Kōzei)
- Fujiwara no Korefusa：A grandson of Fujiwara no Yukinari
- Fujiwara no Sadazane: A son of Fujiwara no Korefusa
- Fujiwara no Sadanobu (藤原定信; 1088-1156): A son of Fujiwara no Sadazane

== See also ==
- Shodo
- Calligraphy
