= Guo Xi =

Song Dynasty painter (1020–1090)

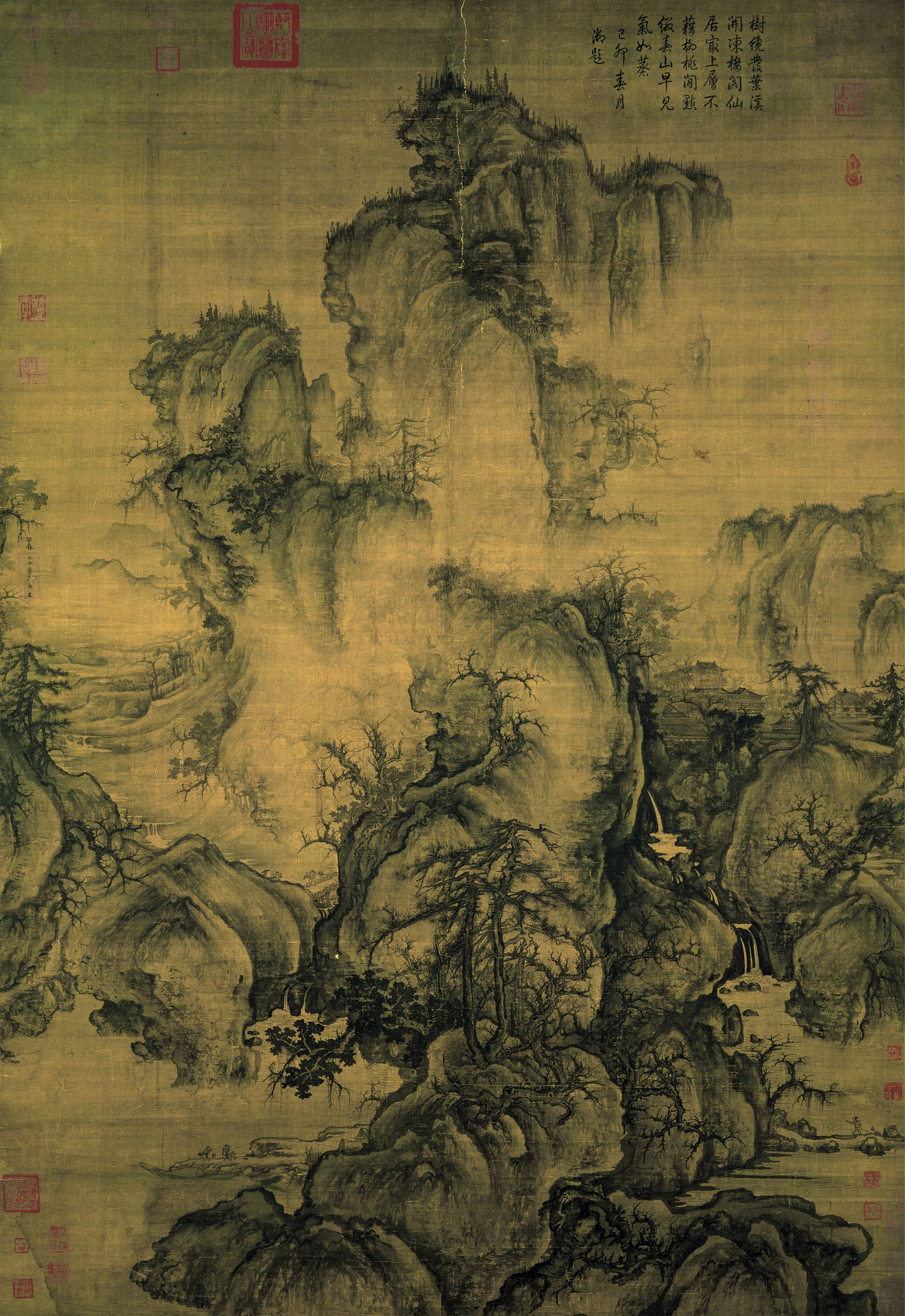
- Early Spring, signed and dated 1072. Hanging scroll, ink and color on silk 158.3x108.1. National Palace Museum, Taipei, Taiwan.
- Born: c. 1020
- Died: c. 1090
- Known for: Painting
- Movement: Northern Song

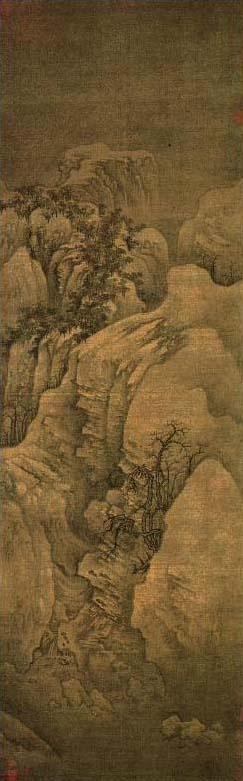
Snow Mountain by Guo Xi, collection of the Shanghai Museum. Guo was a representative painter of landscape painting in the Northern Song dynasty and has been well known for depicting mountains, rivers and forests in winter. This piece shows a scene of deep and serene mountain valley covered with snow and several old trees struggling to survive on precipitous cliffs. It is a masterpiece of Guo Xi by using light ink and magnificent composition to express his open and high artistic conception.

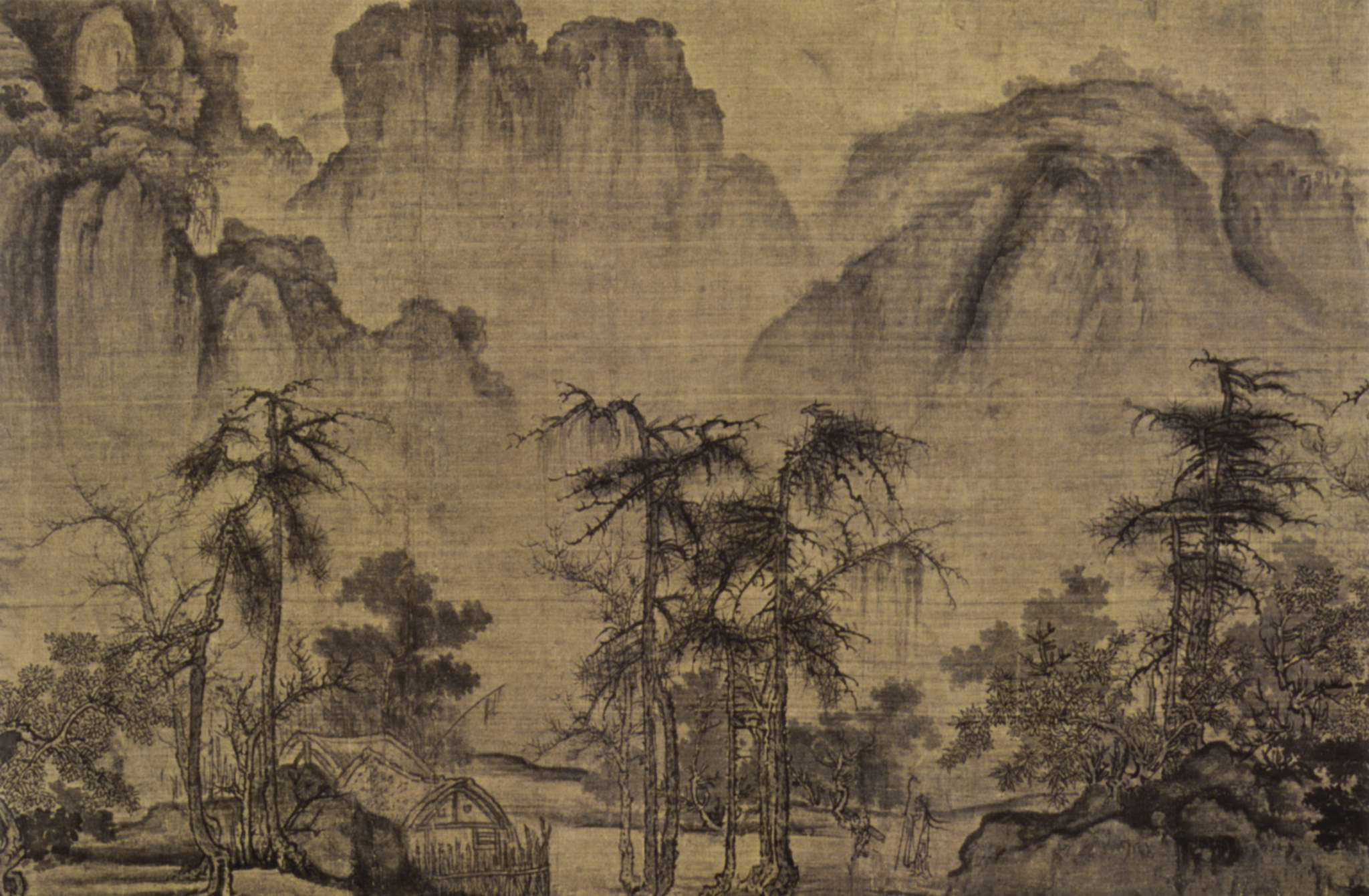
Autumn in the River Valley

Guo Xi (Chinese: 郭熙; pinyin: Guō Xī; Wade–Giles: Kuo Hsi) (c. 1020 – c. 1090) was a Chinese landscape painter from Henan Province who lived during the Northern Song dynasty. One text entitled "The Lofty Message of Forest and Streams" (Linquan Gaozhi 林泉高致) is attributed to him. The work covers a variety of themes centered on the appropriate way of painting a landscape. He was a court professional, a literatus, well-educated painter who developed an incredibly detailed system of idiomatic brushstrokes which became important for later painters. One of his most famous works is Early Spring, dated 1072. The work demonstrates his innovative techniques for producing multiple perspectives which he called "the angle of totality." This type of visual representation is also called "Floating Perspective", a technique which displaces the static eye of the viewer and highlights the differences between Chinese and Western modes of spatial representation.

The following is an excerpt from his treatise, "mountains and waters":

The clouds and the vapours of real landscapes are not the same at the four seasons. In spring they are light and diffused, in summer rich and dense, in autumn scattered and thin, in winter dark and solitary. When such effects can be seen in pictures, the clouds and vapours have an air of life. The mist around the mountains is not the same at the four seasons. The mountains in spring are light and seductive as if smiling: the mountains in summer have a blue-green colour which seems to be spread over them; the mountains in autumn are bright and tidy as if freshly painted; the mountains in winter are sad and tranquil as if sleeping.

Another painting that can be attributed to him is The Coming of Autumn. Both paintings capture the seasonal atmosphere and are regarded as important accomplishments of the Song Dynasty.

Guo Xi was often referred to as a "Northern Song master" when it came to painting. His work inspired many later artists and he even had landscapes dedicated to him. His lesser-known "Deep Valley" scroll painting depicts a serene mountain valley covered with snow and several trees struggling to survive on precipitous cliffs. The ink washes and amorphous brush strokes are employed to model surfaces that suggest the veiling effects of the atmosphere. One of Guo Xi's techniques was to layer ink washes to build up forms and his "Deep Valley" is a masterpiece of the use of light ink and magnificent composition.

His son later described how Guo Xi approached his work: "On days when he was going to paint, he would seat himself at a clean table, by a bright window, burning incense to right and left. He would choose the finest brushes, the most exquisite ink; wash his hands, and clean the ink-stone, as though he were expecting a visitor of rank. He waited until his mind was calm and undisturbed, and then began."

== See also ==
- Chinese art
- Chinese painting
- Culture of the Song dynasty
- History of Chinese art
- Old Trees, Level Distance - a painting by Guo Xi currently in the Metropolitan Museum of Art
