= Culture of the Song dynasty =

Aspect of Chinese history

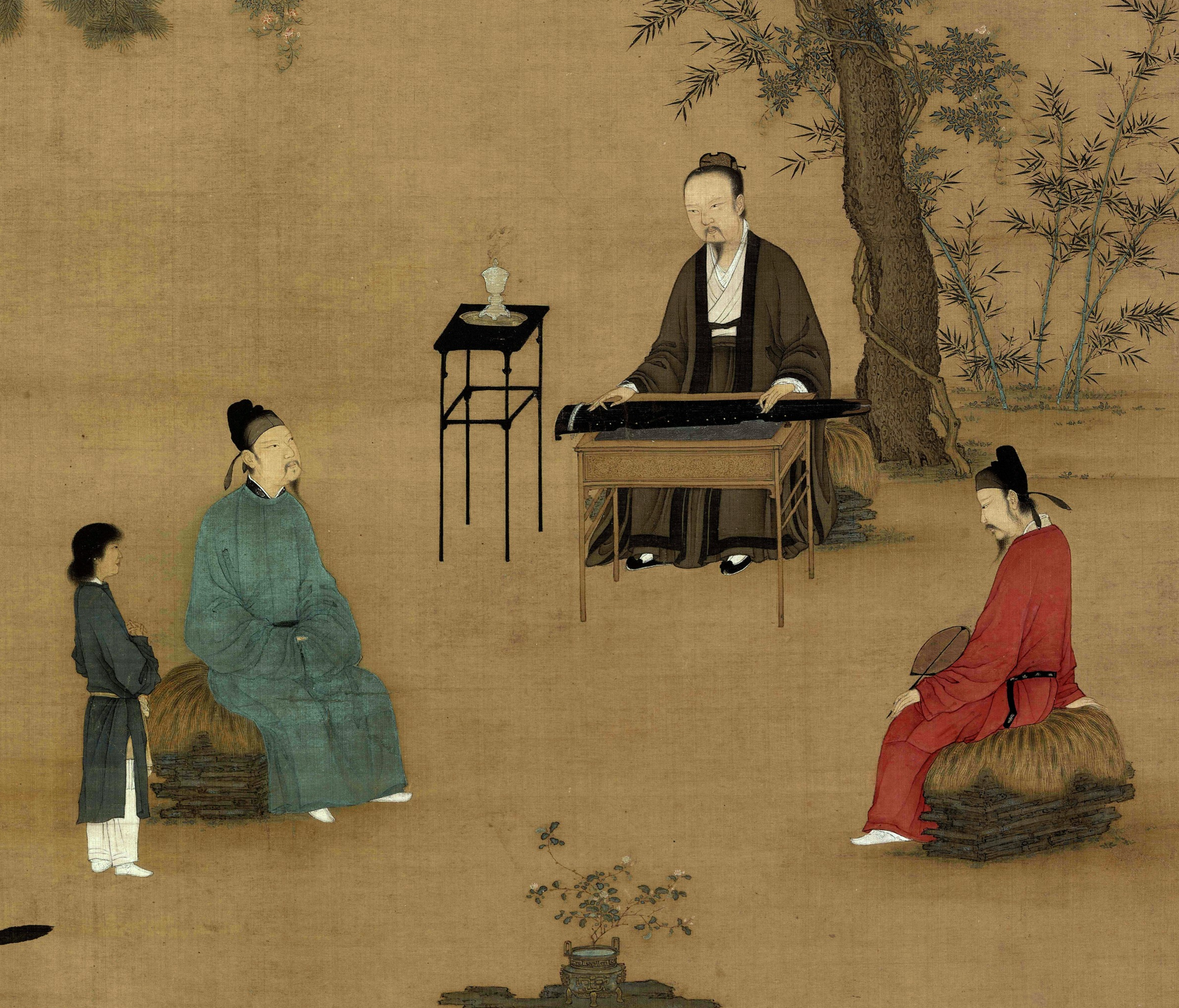
Song Dynasty officials listening to guqin.

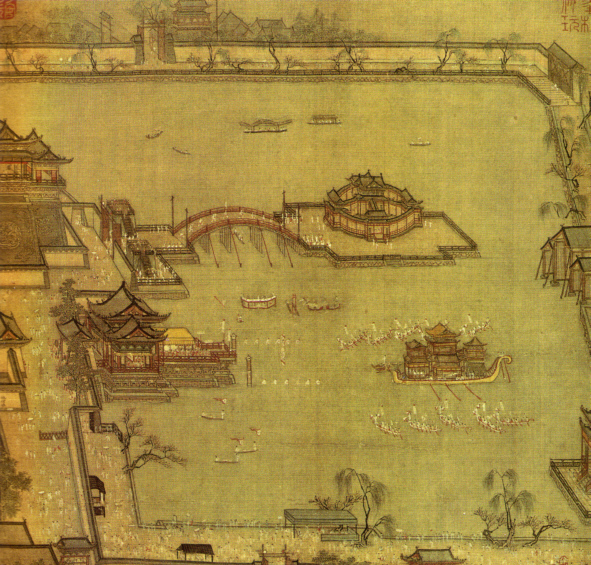
Games in the Jinming Pool, by Zhang Zeduan, a painting depicting the imperial gardens of Kaifeng, Northern Song.

The Song dynasty (960–1279 AD) was a culturally rich and sophisticated age for China. It saw great advancements in the visual arts, music, literature, and philosophy. Officials of the ruling bureaucracy, who underwent a strict and extensive examination process, reached new heights of education in Chinese society, while general Chinese culture was enhanced by widespread printing, growing literacy, and various arts.

Appreciation of art among the gentry class flourished during the Song dynasty, especially in regard to paintings, which was an art practiced by many. Trends in painting styles amongst the gentry notably shifted from the Northern (960–1127) to Southern Song (1127–1279) periods, influenced in part by the gradual embrace of the Neo-Confucian political ideology at court.

People in urban areas enjoyed theatrical drama on stage, restaurants that catered to a variety of regional cooking, lavish clothing and apparel sold in the markets, while both urban and rural people engaged in seasonal festivities and religious holidays.

== Visual arts ==
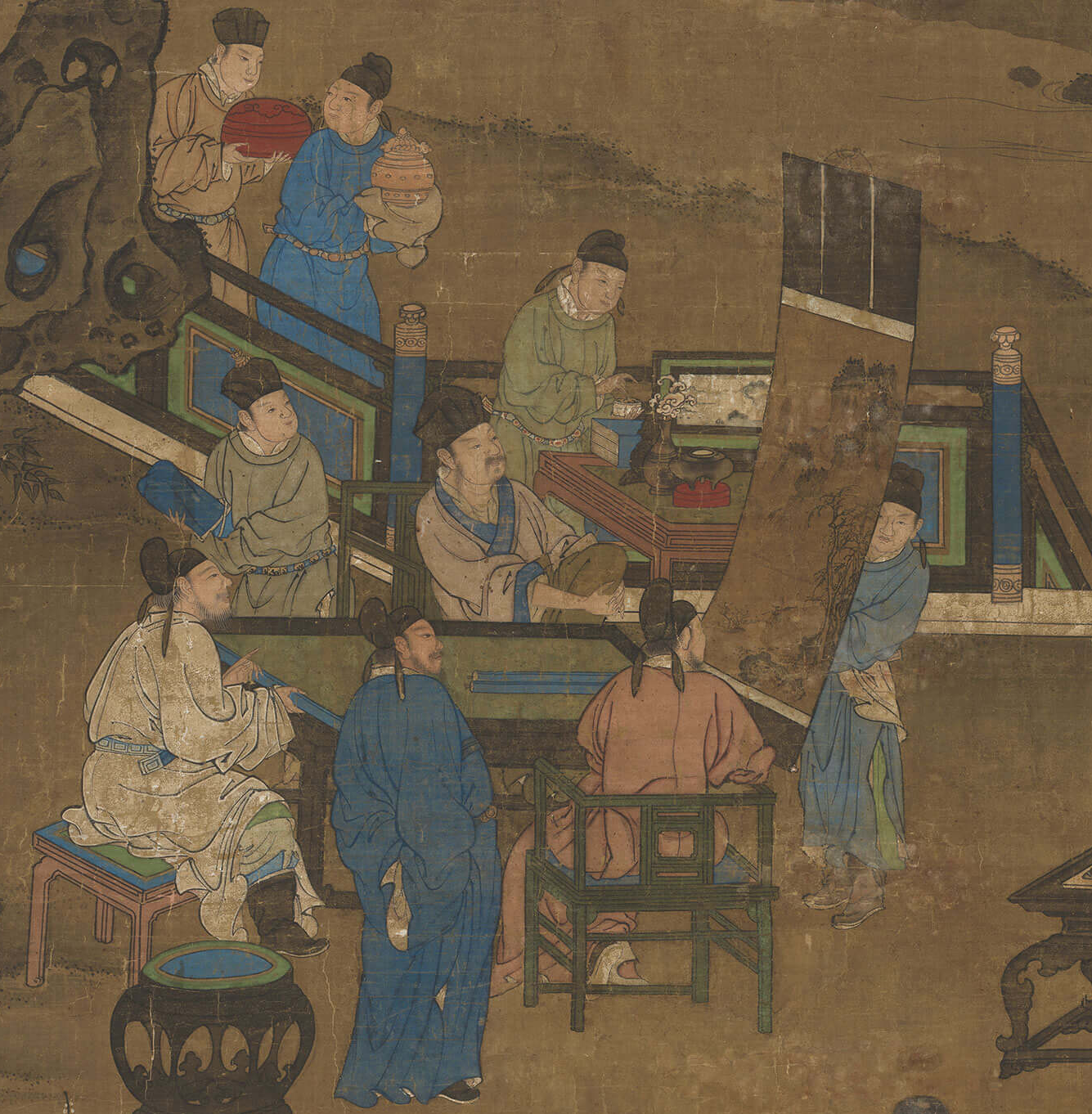
Song dynasty scholars admiring a painting, from Depiction of Ancient Artifacts (宋人博古圖).

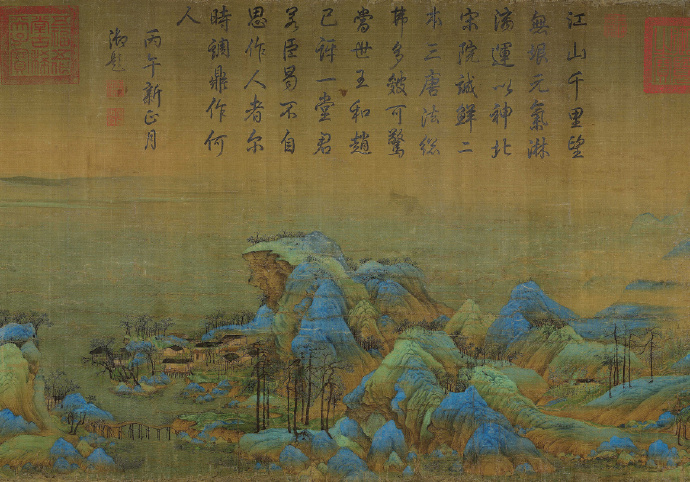
A small section of A Thousand Li of Rivers and Mountains, by Wang Ximeng

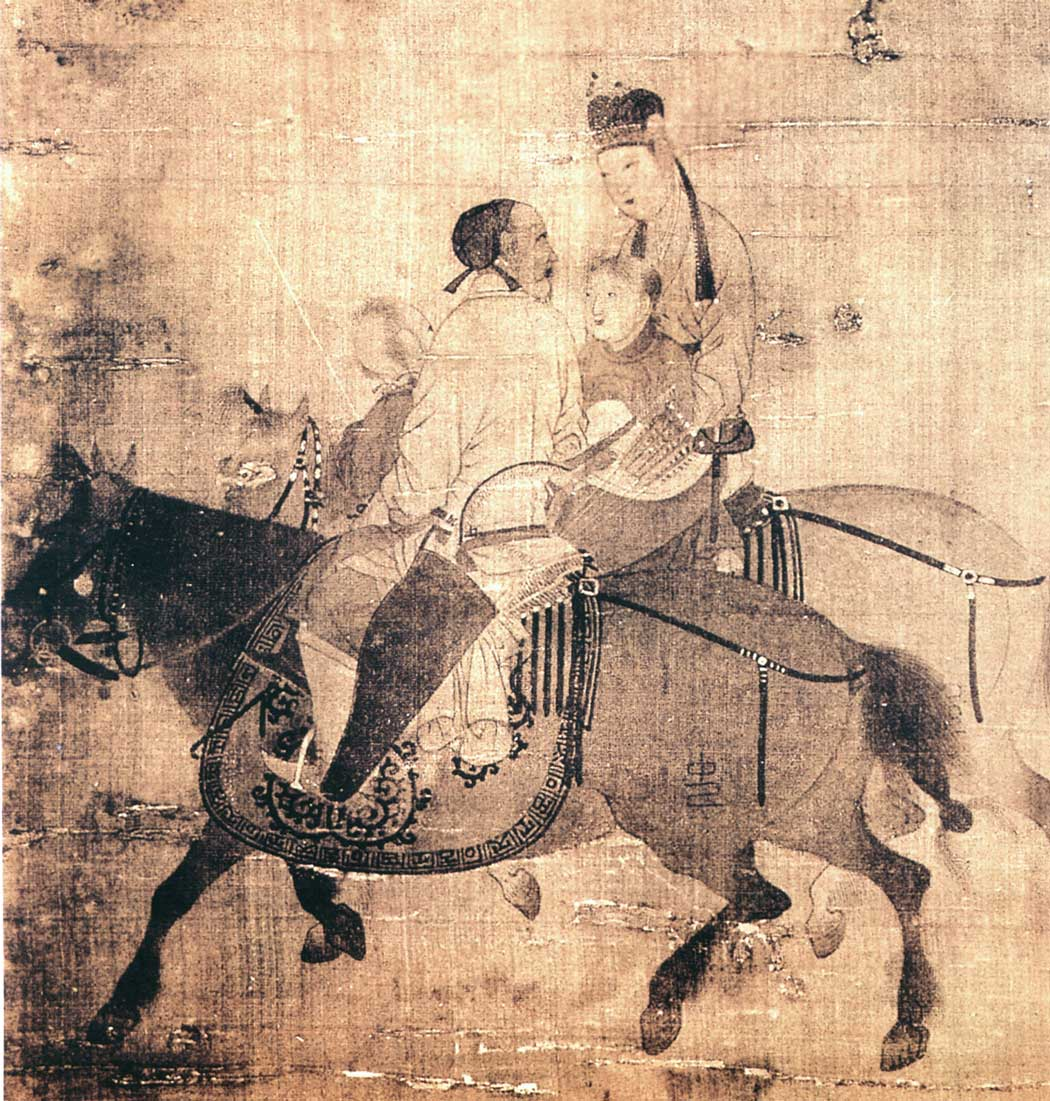
Anonymous painting of Cai Wenji and her Xiongnu husband (Zuoxianwang) dating from the Southern Song.

Chinese painting during the Song dynasty reached a new level of sophistication with further development of landscape painting. The shan shui style painting—"shan" meaning mountain, and "shui" meaning river—became prominent features in Chinese landscape art. The emphasis laid upon landscape painting in the Song period was grounded in Chinese philosophy; Taoism stressed that humans were but tiny specks amongst vast and greater cosmos, while Neo-Confucianist writers often pursued the discovery of patterns and principles that they believed caused all social and natural phenomena. The making of glazed and translucent porcelain and celadon wares with complex use of enamels was also developed further during the Song period. Longquan celadon wares were particularly popular in the Song period. Black and red lacquerwares of the Song period featured beautifully carved artwork of miniature nature scenes, landscapes, or simple decorative motifs. However, even though intricate bronze-casting, ceramics and lacquerware, jade carving, sculpture, architecture, and the painting of portraits and closely viewed objects like birds on branches were held in high esteem by the Song Chinese, landscape painting was paramount. By the beginning of the Song dynasty a distinctive landscape style had emerged. Artists mastered the formula of creating intricate and realistic scenes placed in the foreground, while the background retained qualities of vast and infinite space. Distant mountain peaks rise out of high clouds and mist, while streaming rivers run from afar into the foreground.

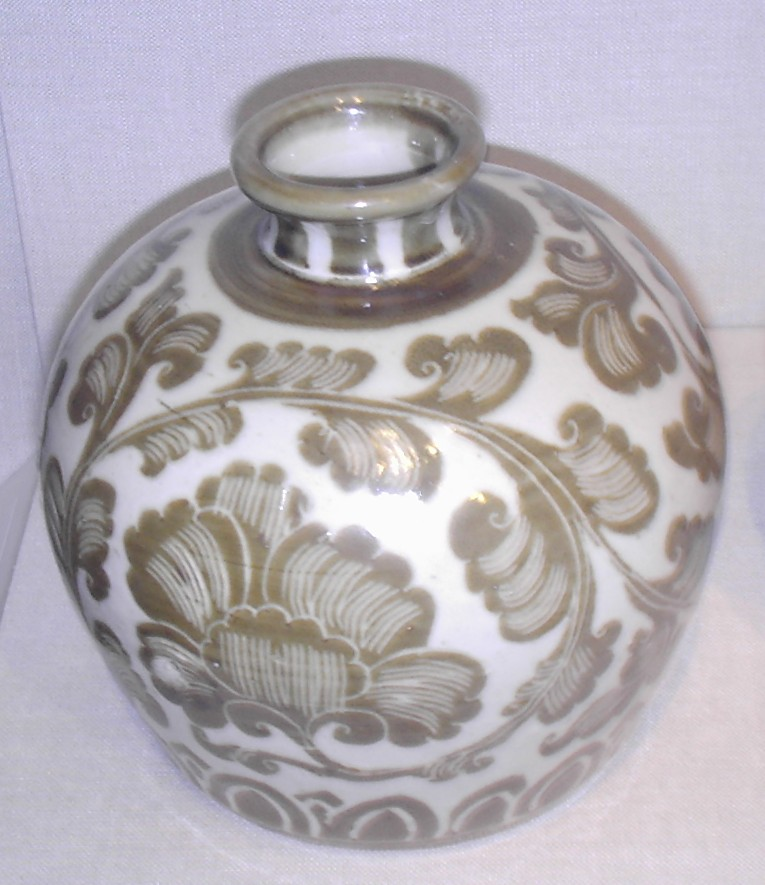
Song ding ware porcelain bottle, 11th century.

There was a significant difference in painting trends between the Northern Song period (960–1127) and Southern Song period (1127–1279). The paintings of Northern Song officials were influenced by their political ideals of bringing order to the world and tackling the largest issues affecting the whole of their society, hence their paintings often depicted huge, sweeping landscapes. On the other hand, Southern Song officials were more interested in reforming society from the bottom up and on a much smaller scale, a method they believed had a better chance for eventual success. Hence, their paintings often focused on smaller, visually closer, and more intimate scenes, while the background was often depicted as bereft of detail as a realm without substance or concern for the artist or viewer. This change in attitude from one era to the next stemmed largely from the rising influence of Neo-Confucian philosophy. Adherents to Neo-Confucianism focused on reforming society from the bottom up, not the top down, which can be seen in their efforts to promote small private academies during the Southern Song instead of the large state-controlled academies seen in the Northern Song era.

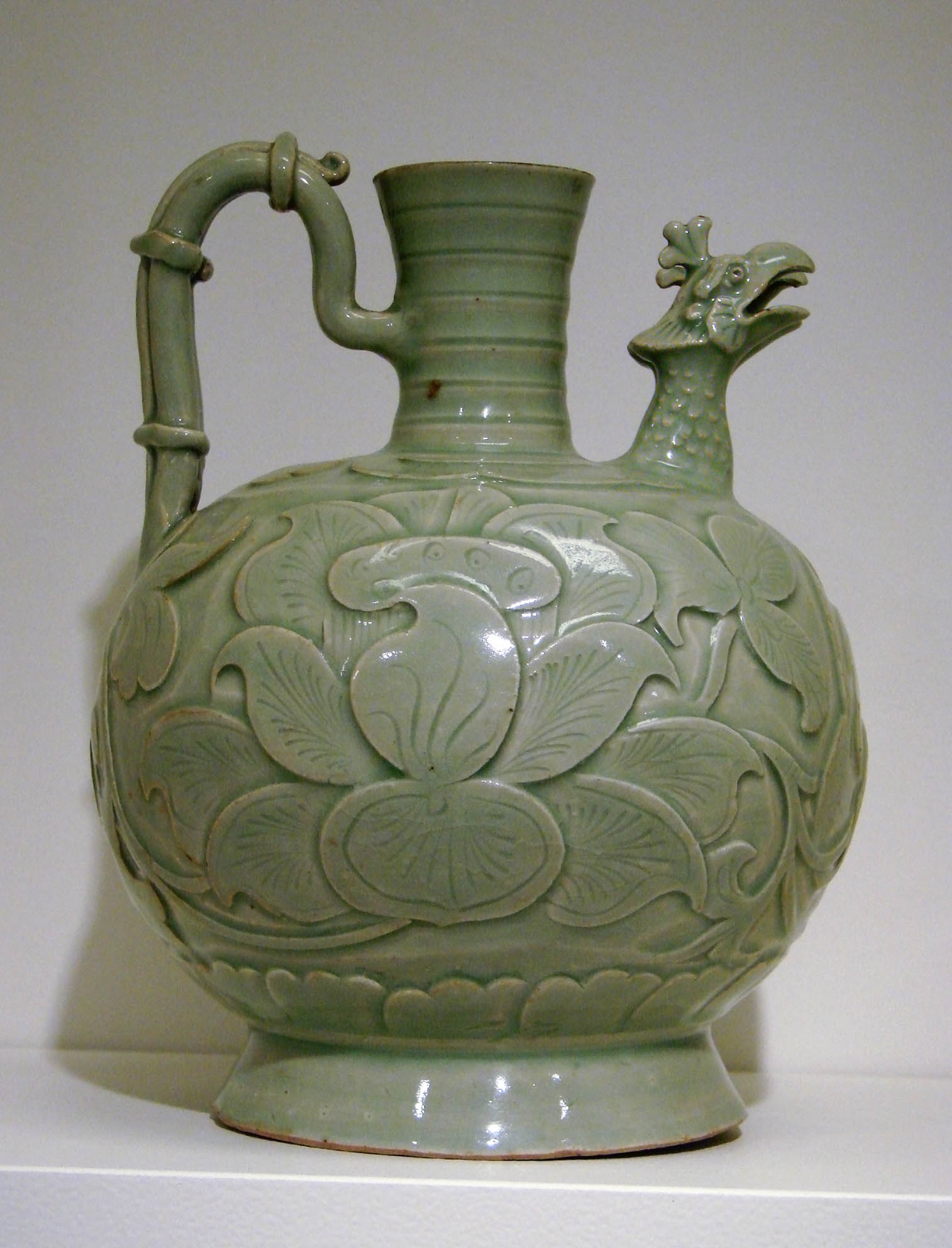
A vase with a phoenix-headed spout, gray sandstone with celadon coating, 10th century.

Ever since the Southern and Northern Dynasties (420–589), painting had become an art of high sophistication that was associated with the gentry class as one of their main artistic pastimes, the others being calligraphy and poetry. During the Song dynasty there were avid art collectors that would often meet in groups to discuss their own paintings, as well as rate those of their colleagues and friends. The poet and statesman Su Shi (1037–1101) and his accomplice Mi Fu (1051–1107) often partook in these affairs, borrowing art pieces to study and copy, or if they really admired a piece then an exchange was often proposed. The small round paintings popular in the Southern Song were often collected into albums as poets would write poems along the side to match the theme and mood of the painting.

Although they were avid art collectors, some Song scholars did not readily appreciate artworks commissioned by those painters found at shops or common marketplaces, and some of the scholars even criticized artists from renowned schools and academies. Anthony J. Barbieri-Low, a Professor of Early Chinese History at the University of California, Santa Barbara, points out that Song scholars' appreciation of art created by their peers was not extended to those who made a living simply as professional artists:

During the Northern Song (960–1126 CE), a new class of scholar-artists emerged who did not possess the trompe-l'oeil skills of the academy painters nor even the proficiency of common marketplace painters. The literati's painting was simpler and at times quite unschooled, yet they would criticize these other two groups as mere professionals, since they relied on paid commissions for their livelihood and did not paint merely for enjoyment or self-expression. The scholar-artists considered that painters who concentrated on realistic depictions, who employed a colorful palette, or, worst of all, who accepted monetary payment for their work were no better than butchers or tinkers in the marketplace. They were not to be considered real artists.

However, during the Song period, there were many acclaimed court painters and they were highly esteemed by emperors and the royal family. One of the greatest landscape painters given patronage by the Song court was Zhang Zeduan (1085–1145), who painted the original Along the River During Qingming Festival scroll, one of the most well-known masterpieces of Chinese visual art. Emperor Gaozong of Song (1127–1162) once commissioned an art project of numerous paintings for the Eighteen Songs of a Nomad Flute, based on the woman poet Cai Wenji (177–250 AD) of the earlier Han dynasty. The Southern Song dynasty court painters included Zhao Mengjian (趙孟堅, c. 1199–1264), a member of the Imperial family, known for popularising the Three Friends of Winter.

During the Song period Buddhism saw a small revival since its persecution during the Tang dynasty. This could be seen in the continued construction of sculpture artwork at the Dazu Rock Carvings in Sichuan province. Similar in design to the sculptures at Dazu, the Song temple at Mingshan in Anyue, Sichuan province features a wealth of Song era Buddhist sculptures, including the Buddha and deities clad in lavish imperial and monastic robes.

=== Paintings ===
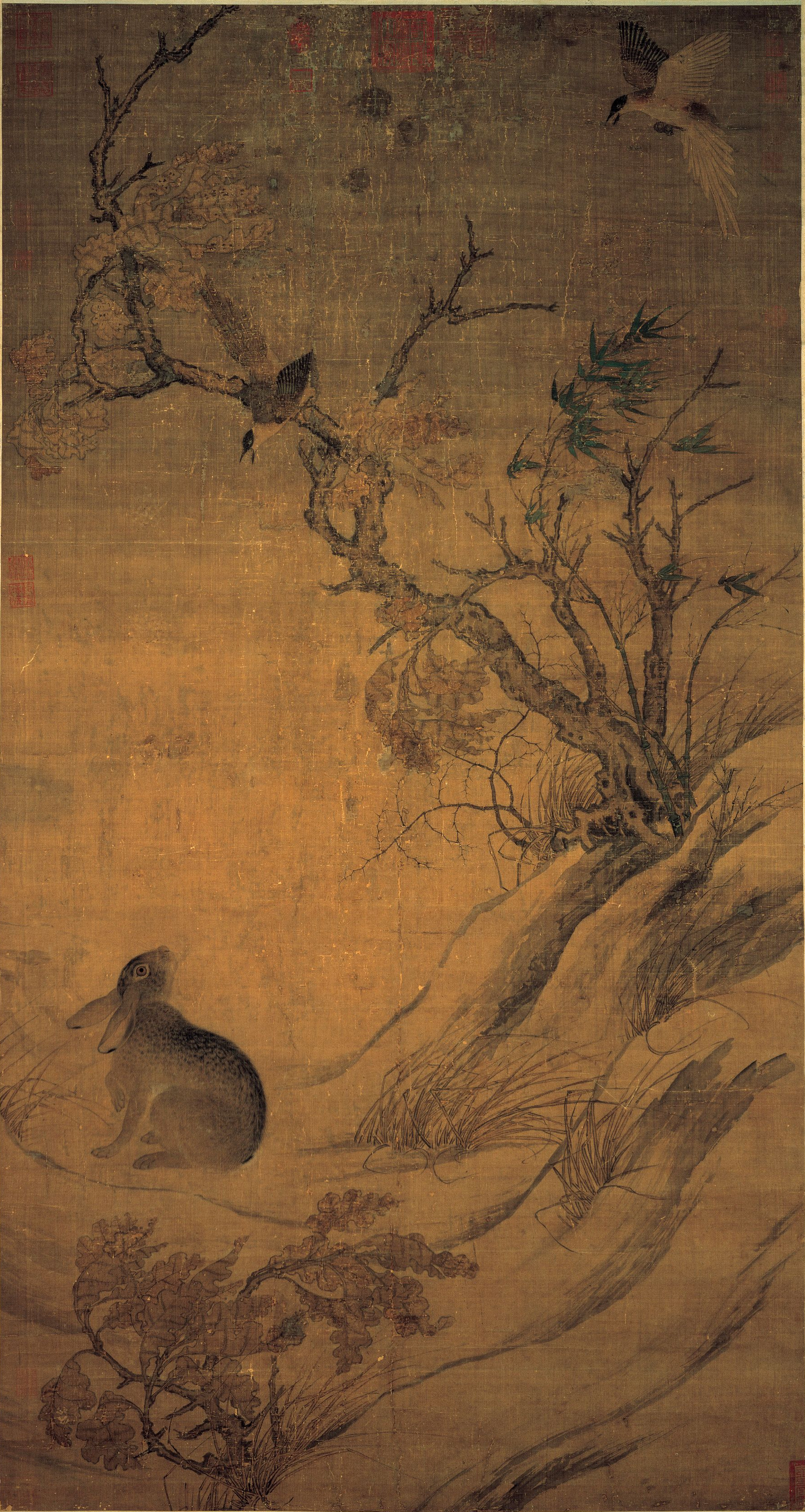
Magpies and Hare, signed and dated by Cui Bai, latter 11th century.

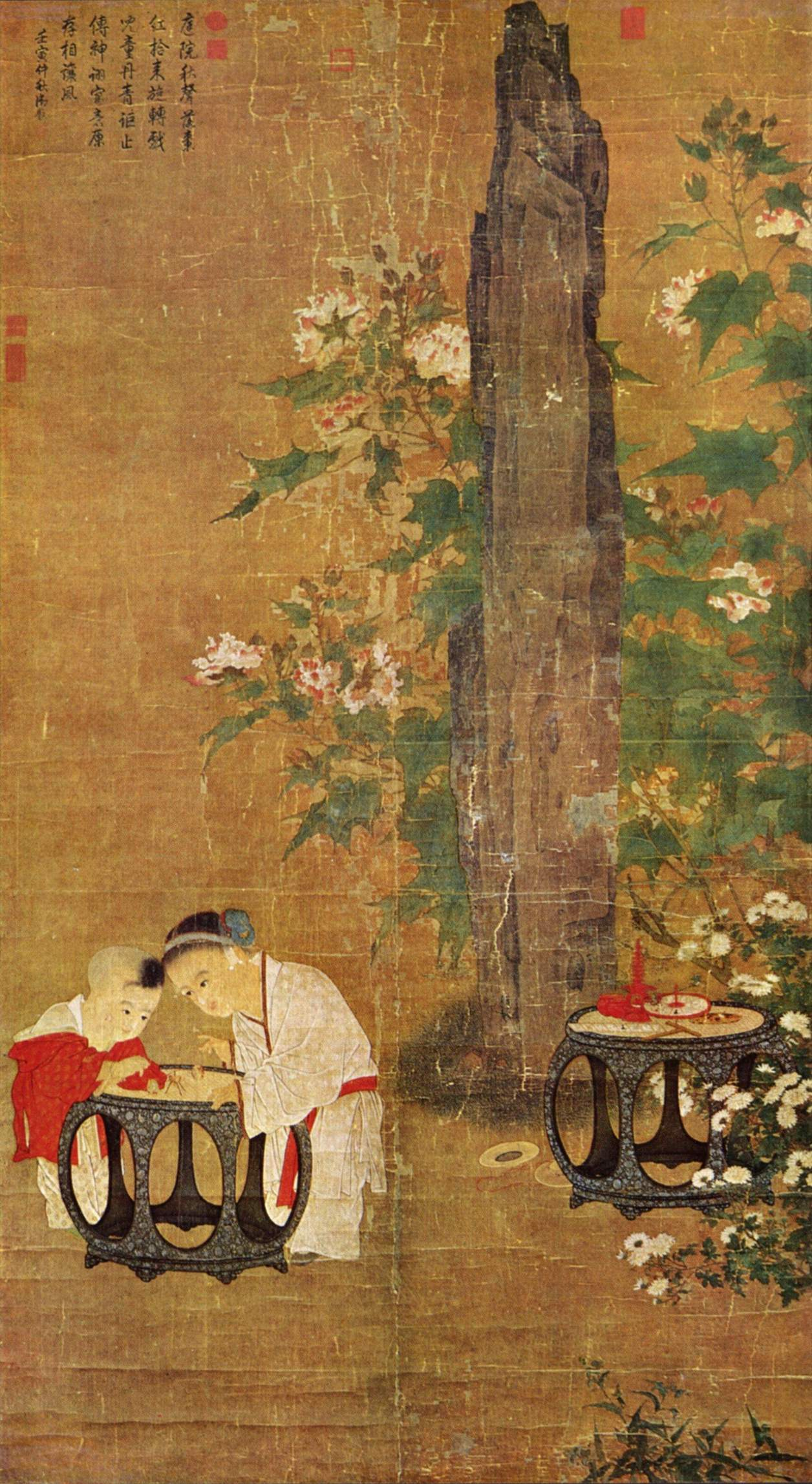
Playing Children, by Su Han Chen, 1150.

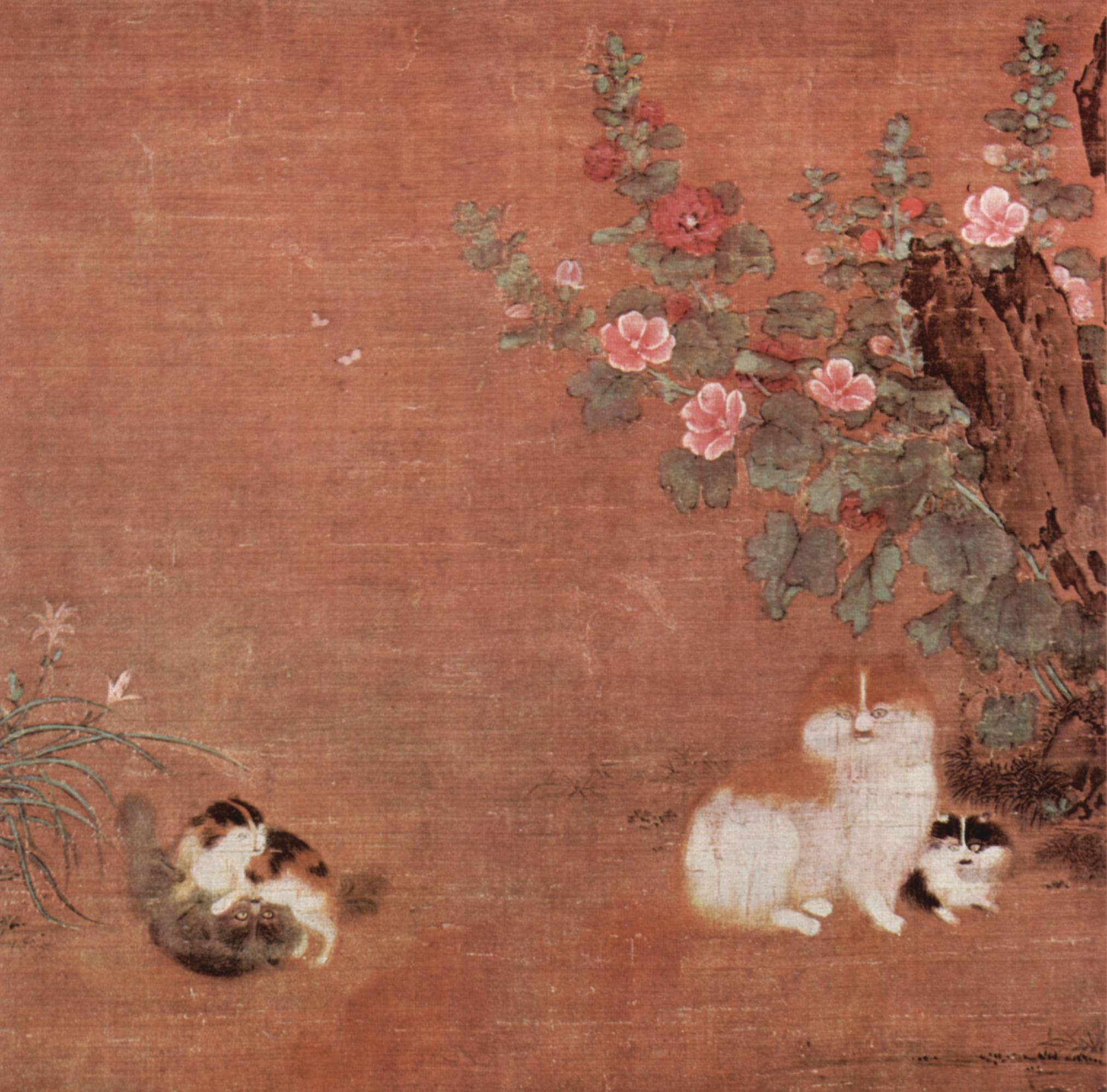
Cats in the Garden, by Mao Yi, 12th century.

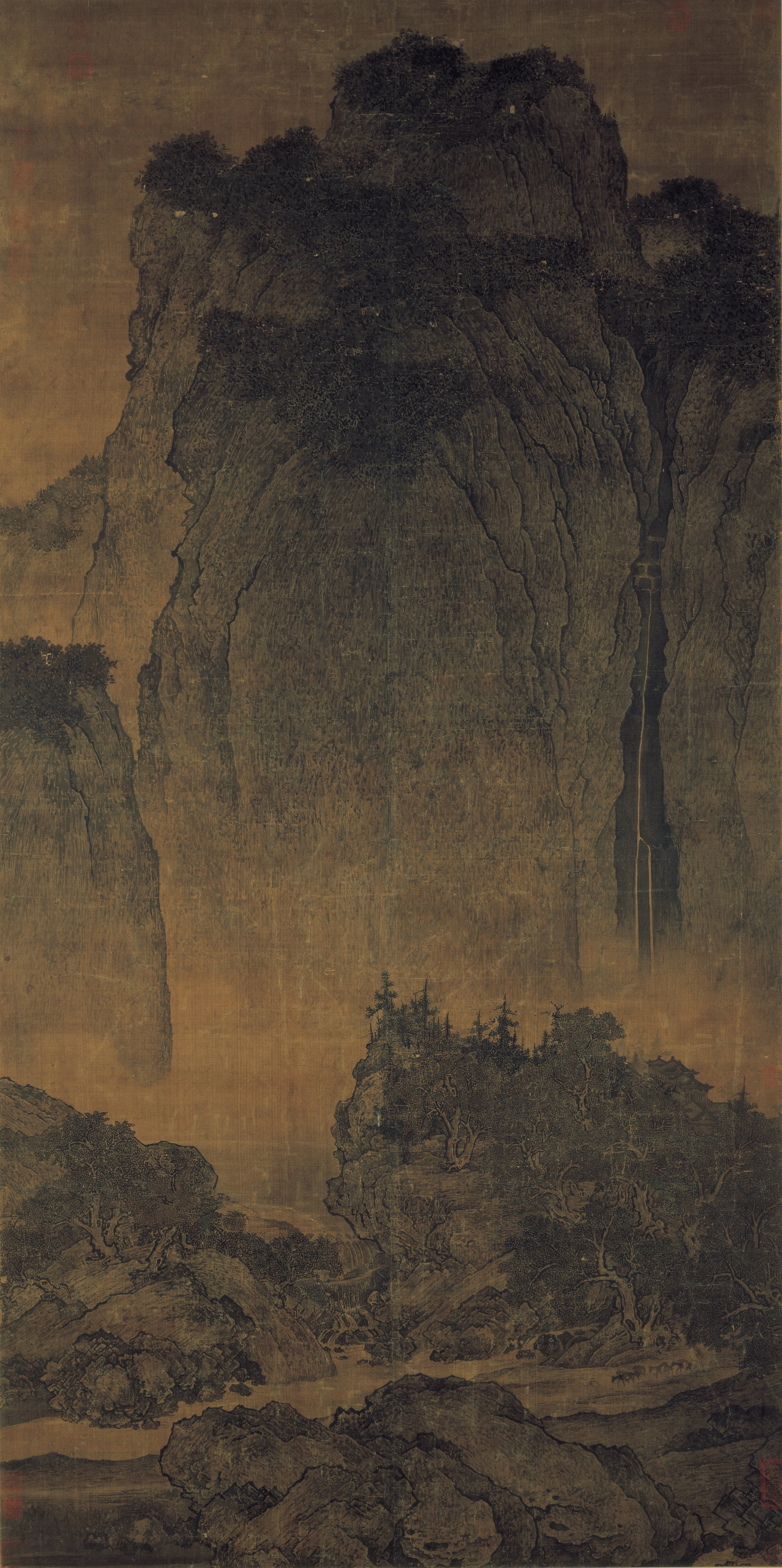
Travelers among Mountains and Streams, by Fan Kuan, 11th century

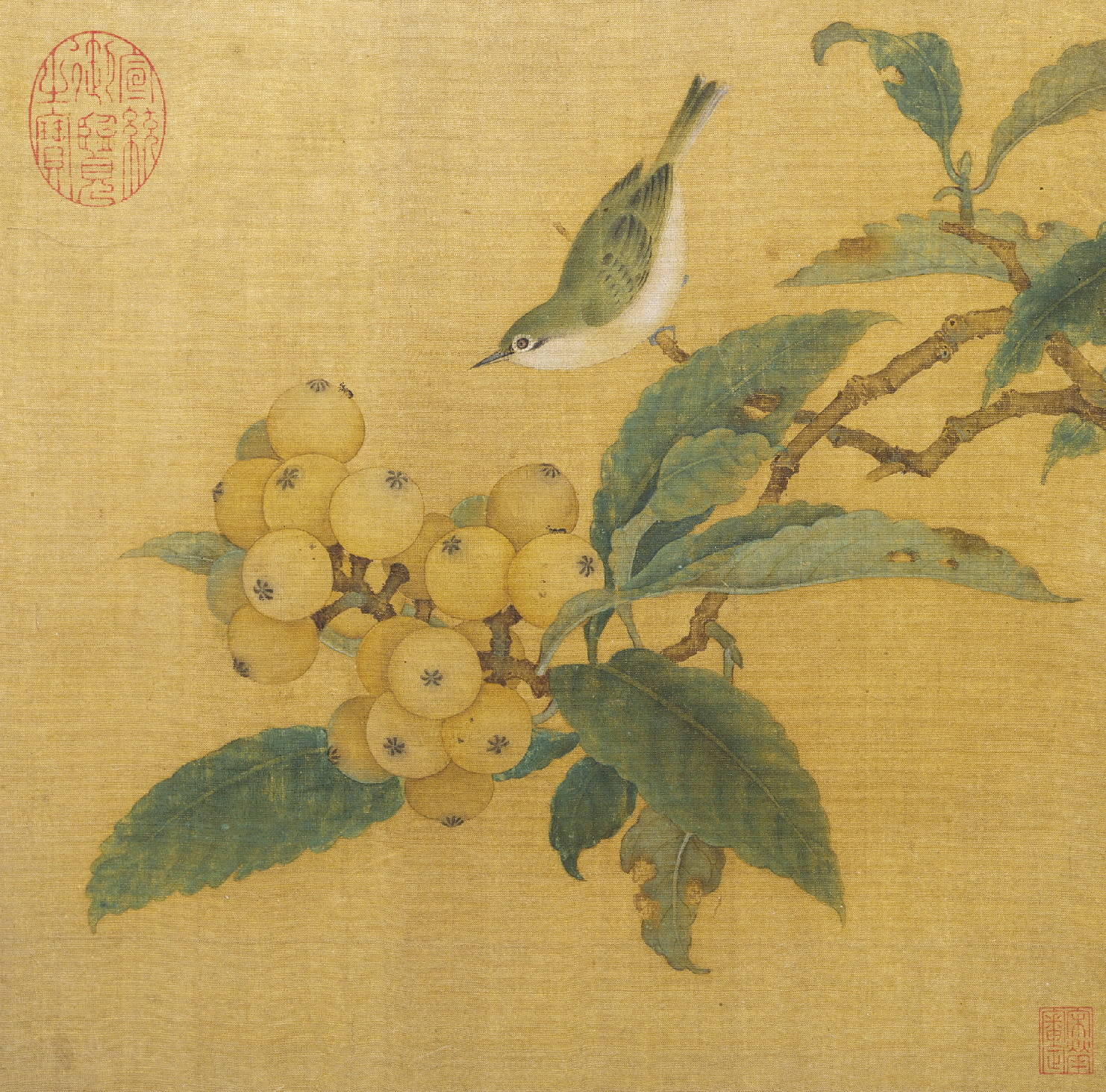
Loquats and Mountain Bird, anonymous painter of the Southern Song

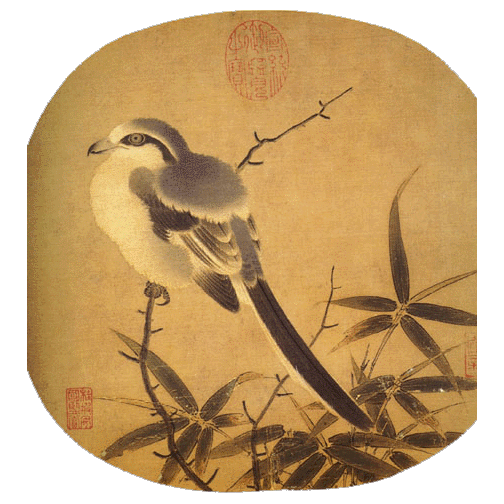
Bird on a Branch, Li Anzhong, early-mid 12th century

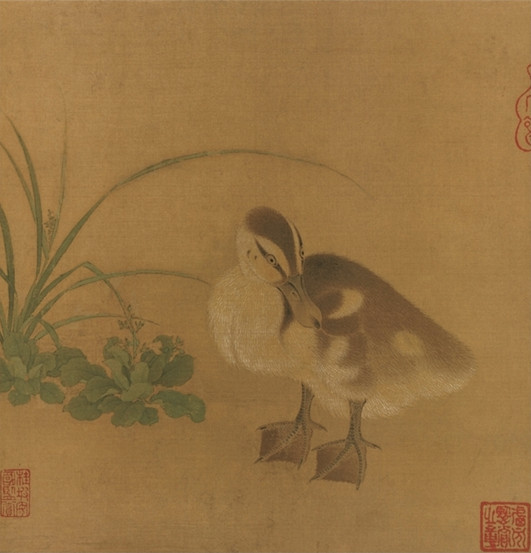
A duckling, anonymous painter of the Southern Song

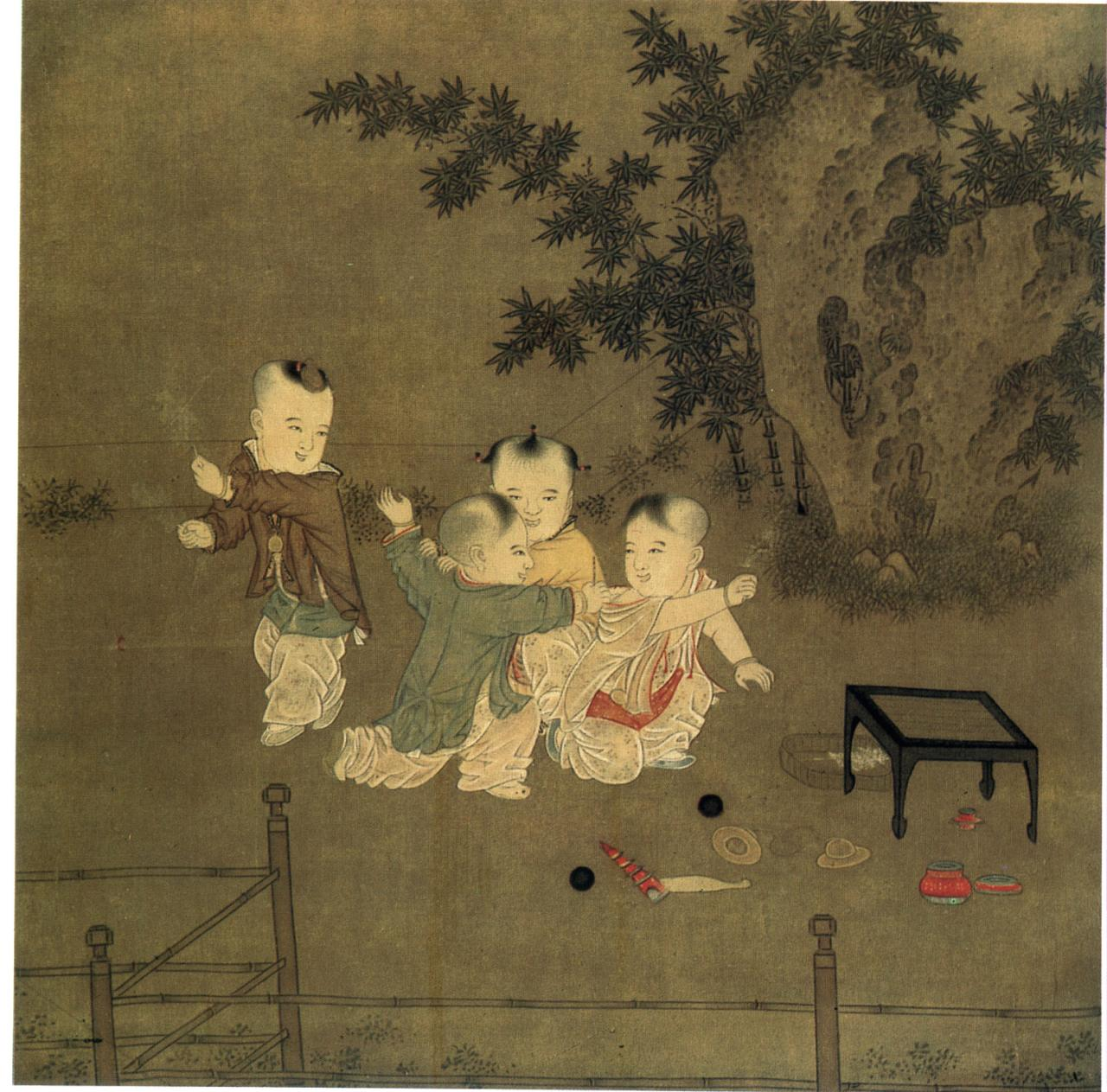
Palace children playing, Northern or Southern Song

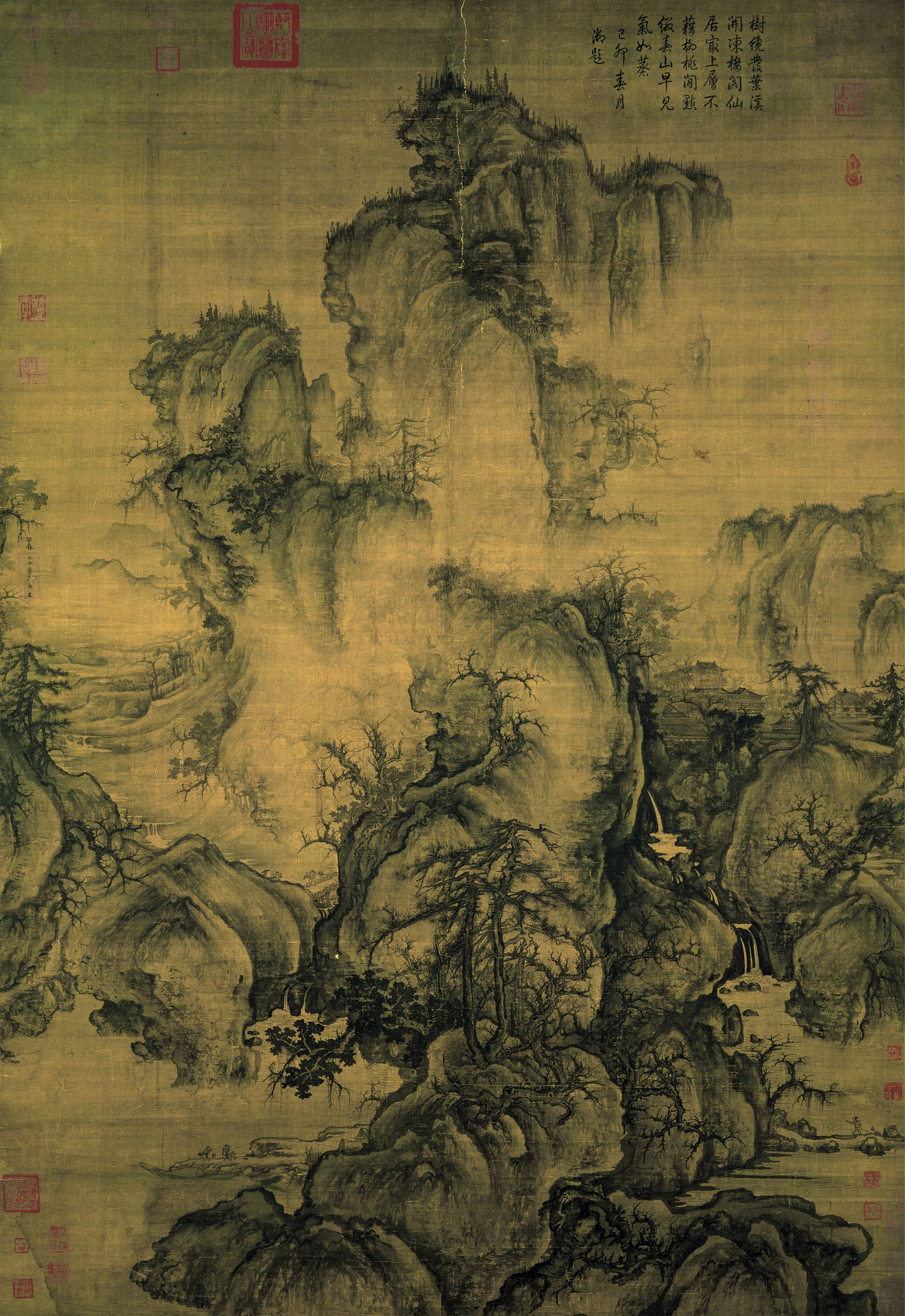
Early Spring, by Guo Xi (c. 1020–1090), 1072.

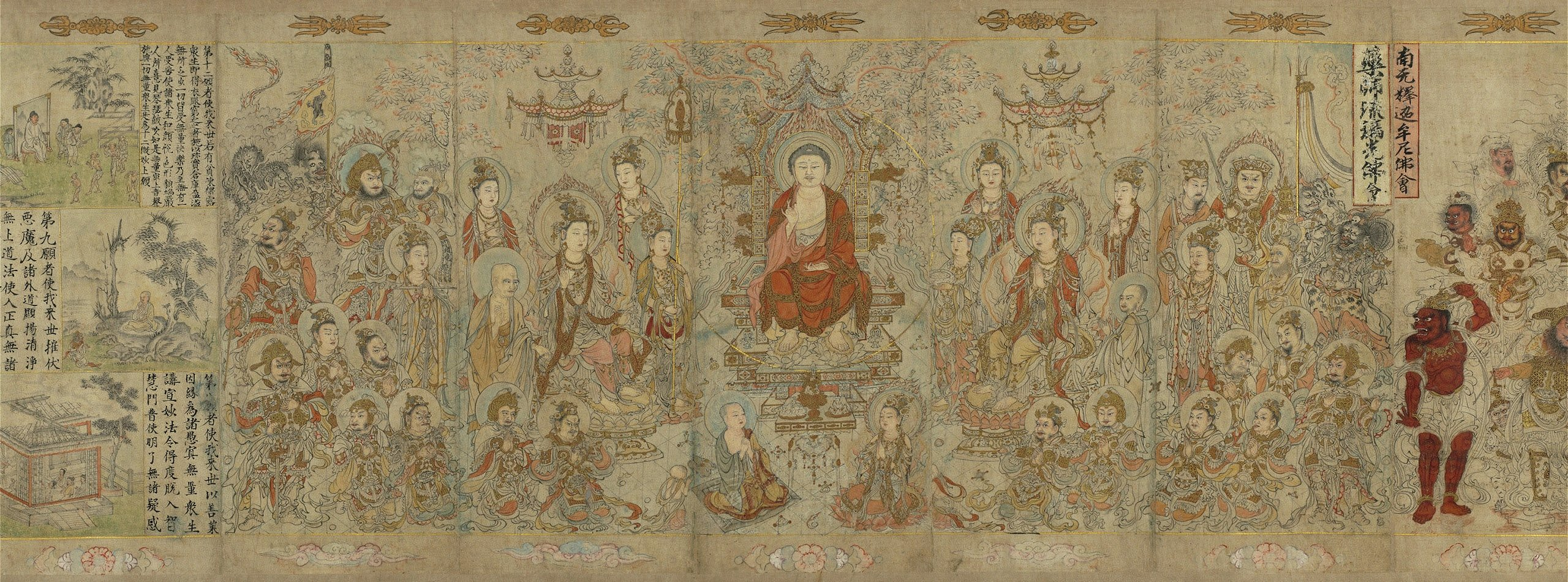
The Sakyamuni Buddha, by Zhang Shengwen, c. 1173–1176

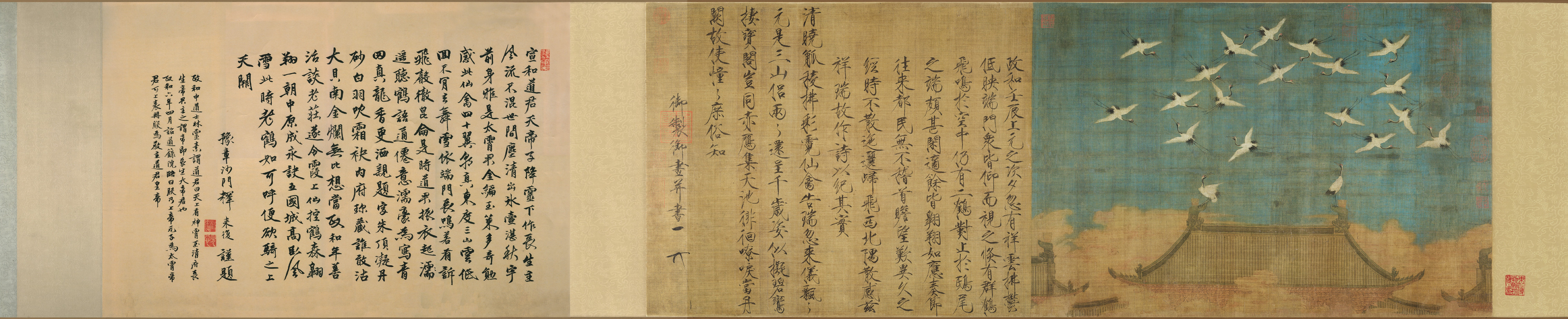
Painting by Emperor Huizong of Song, a renowned scholar and painter, 1112

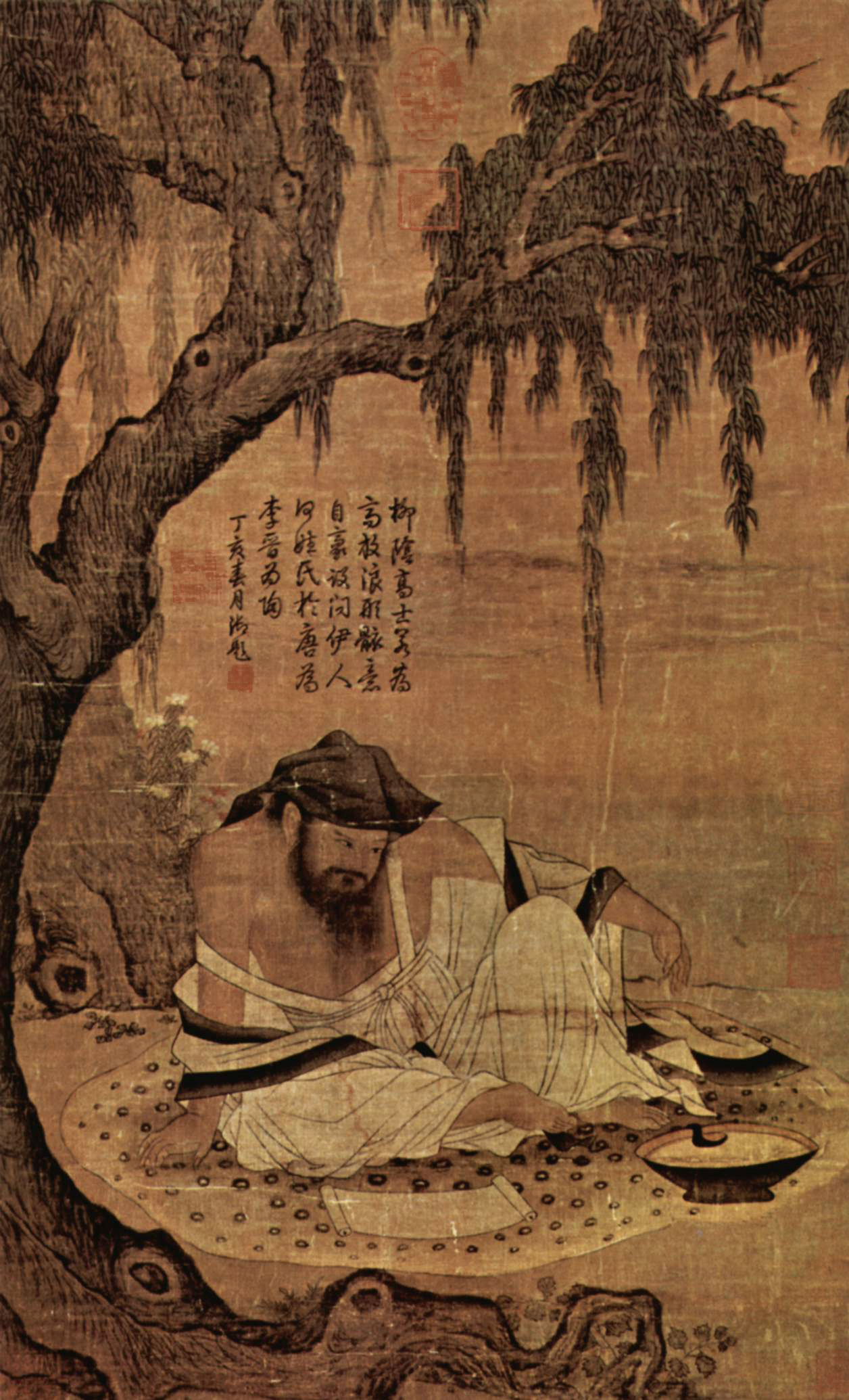
A Scholar in a Meadow, 11th century.

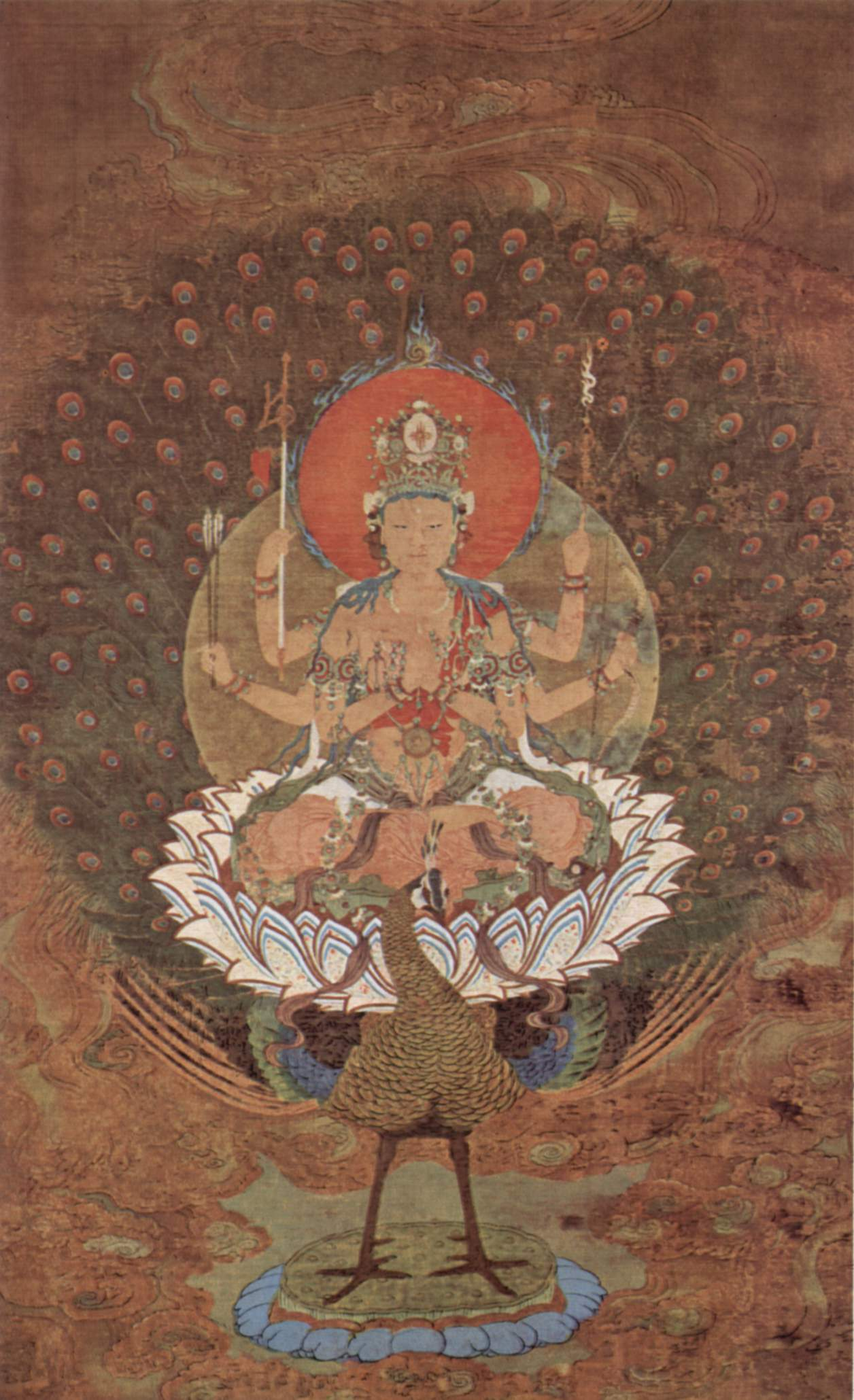
The Peacock King, Gunsho Mingwang, 11th century.

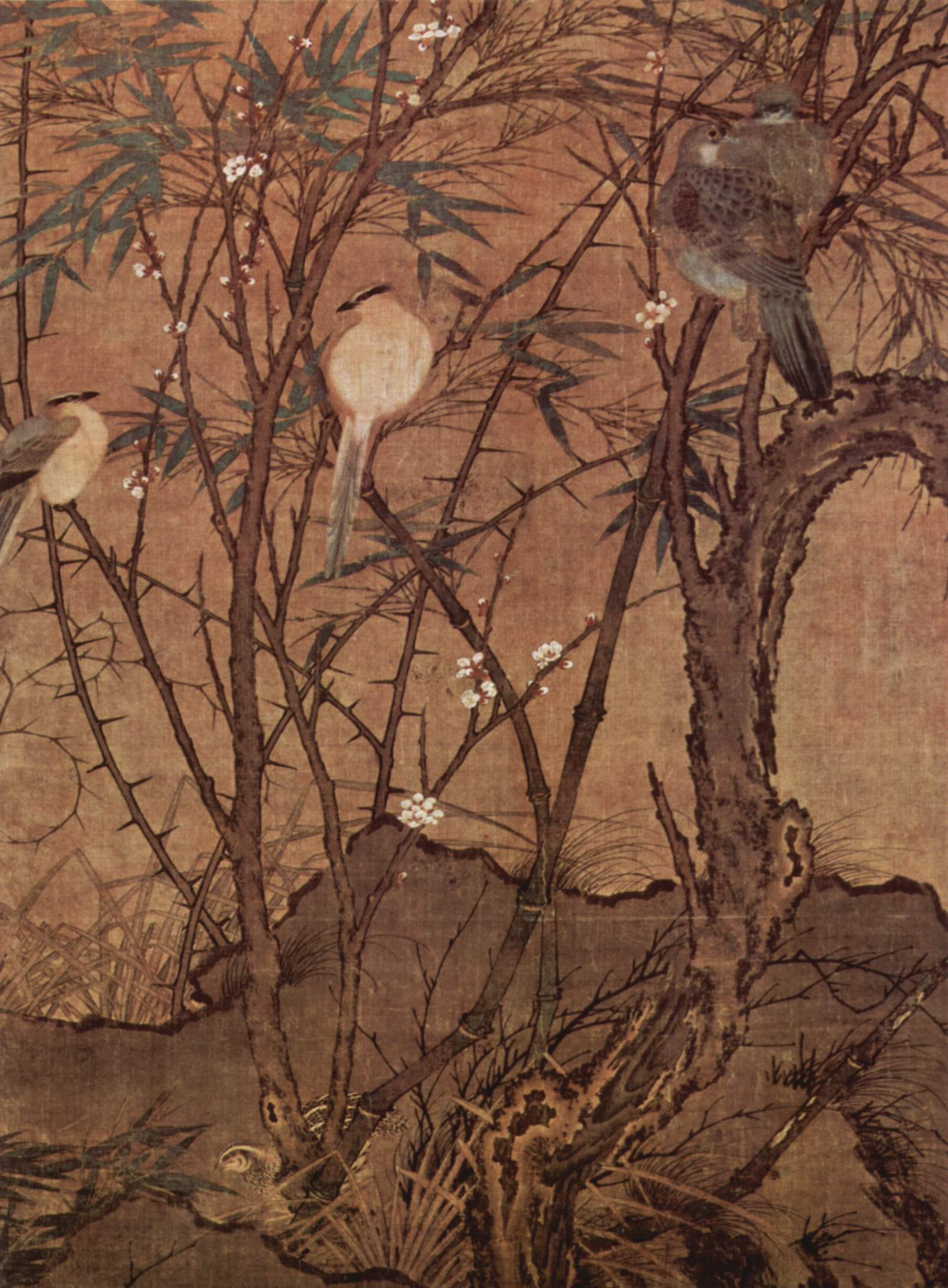
Birds in a Bamboo and Plum Tree Thicket, 12th century.

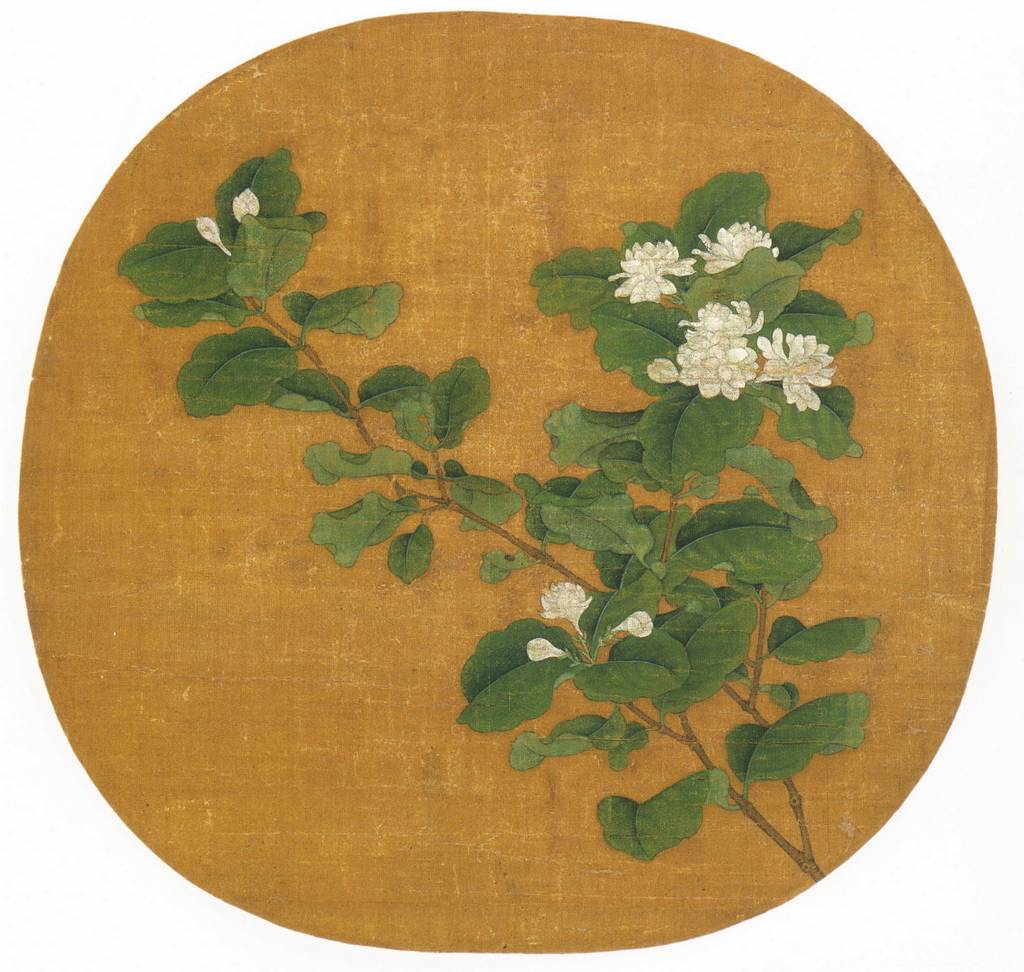
The White Jasmine Branch, 12th century.

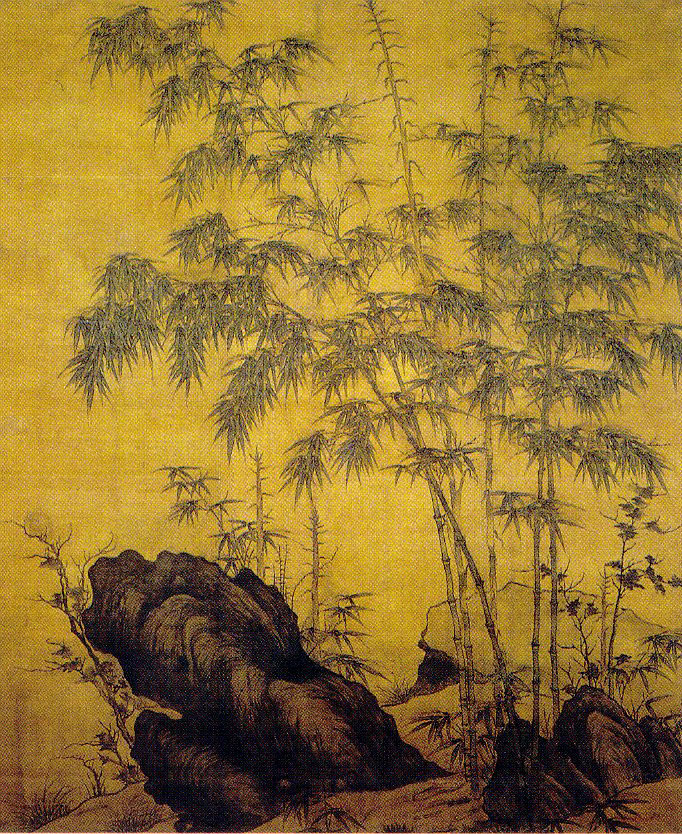
Bamboos and Rock, by Li Kan (1244–1320)

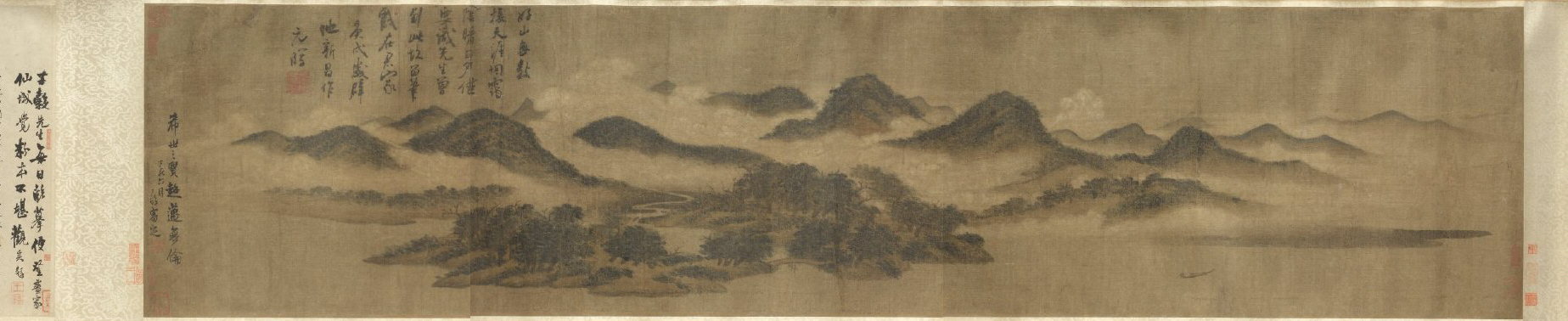
Cloudy Mountains, by Mi Youren (son of Mi Fu), 1130.

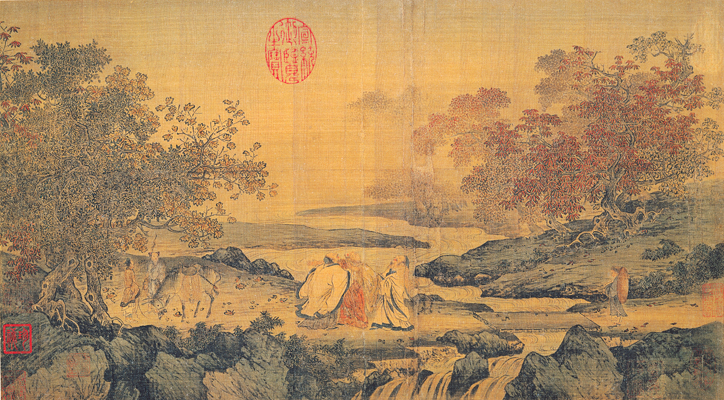
Confucianism, Taoism, and Buddhism are one, a painting in the Litang style, 12th century.

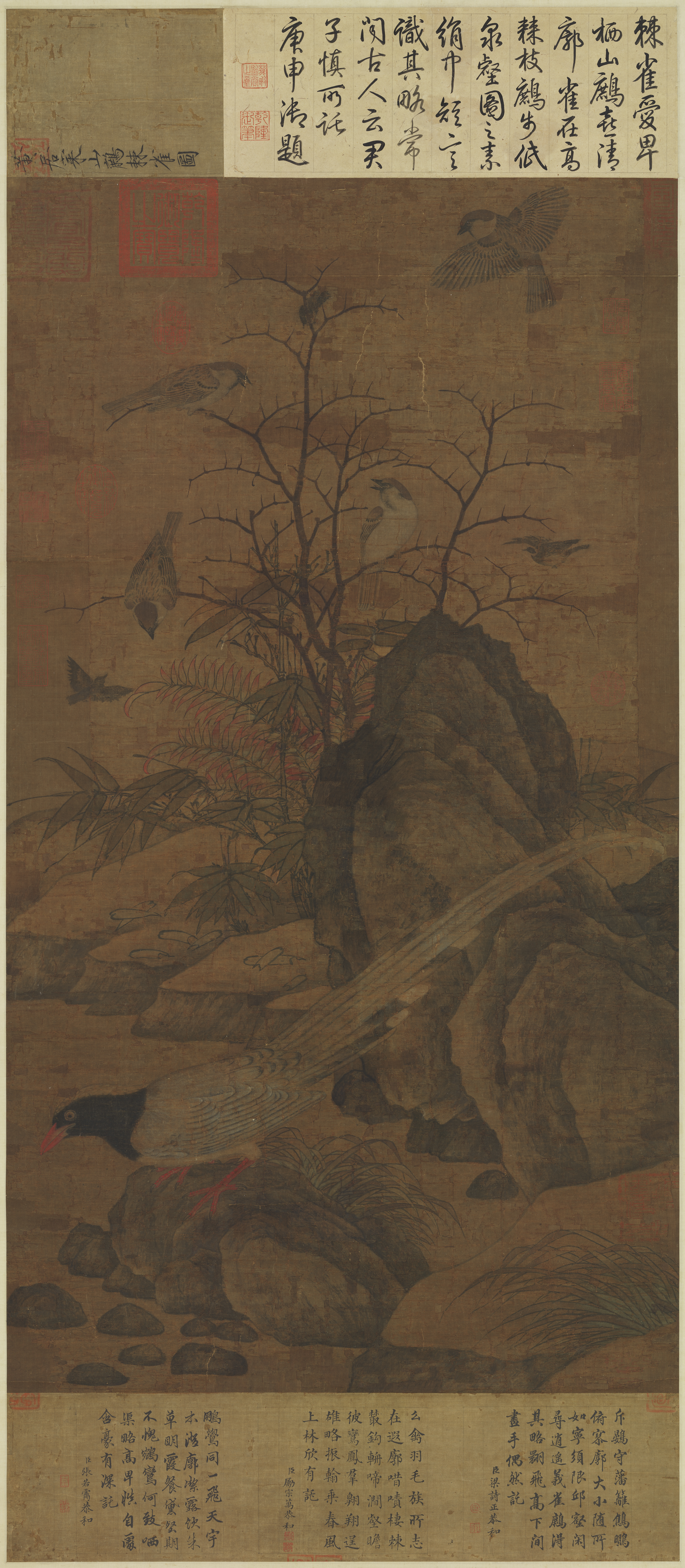
Mountain Magpie, Sparrows and Bramble, by Huang Zhucai (933–after 993).

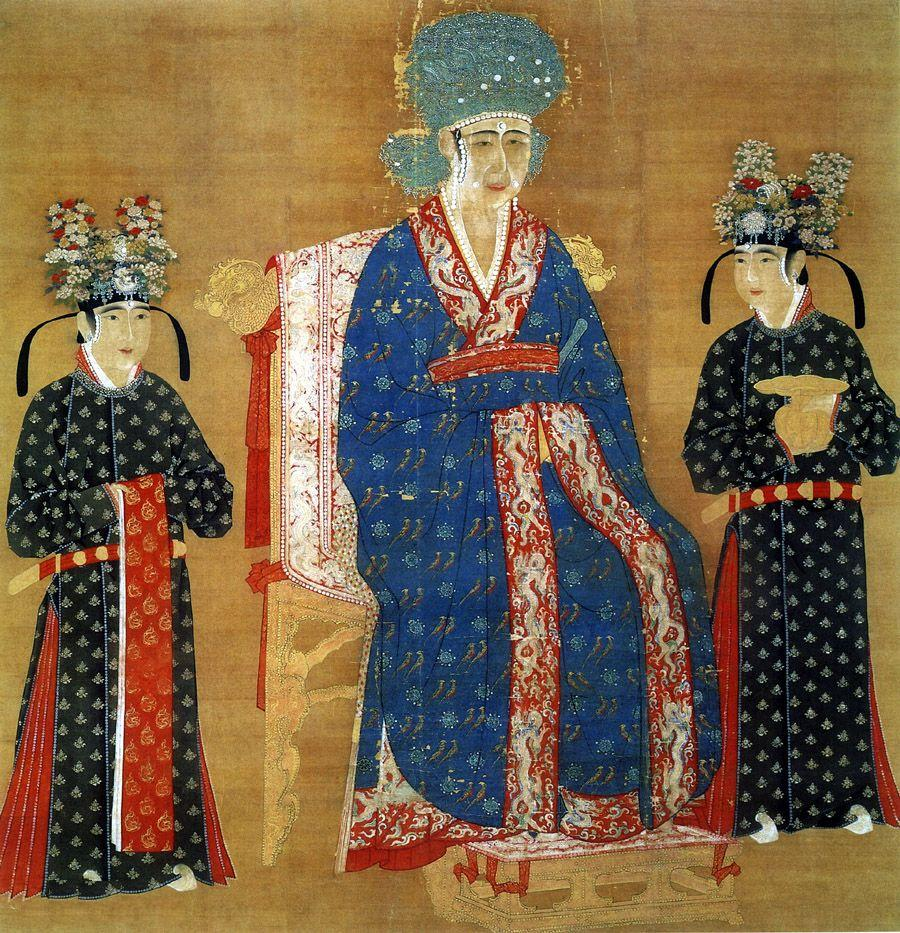
Official Song era portrait painting of Empress Cao, wife of Emperor Renzong of Song

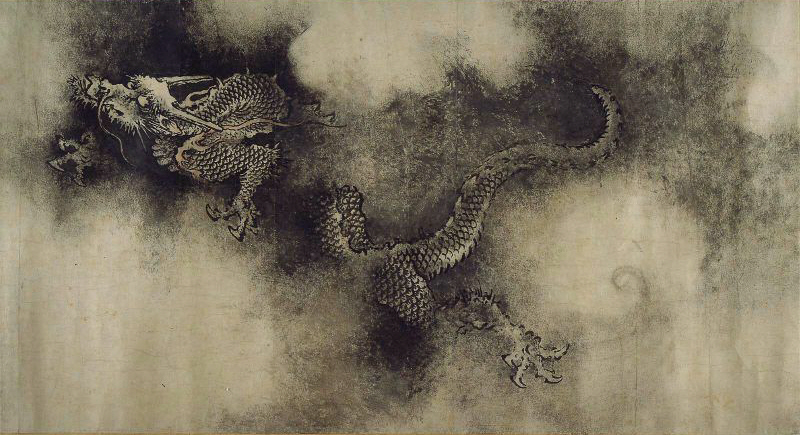
One of the Nine Dragons by Chen Rong, 1244.

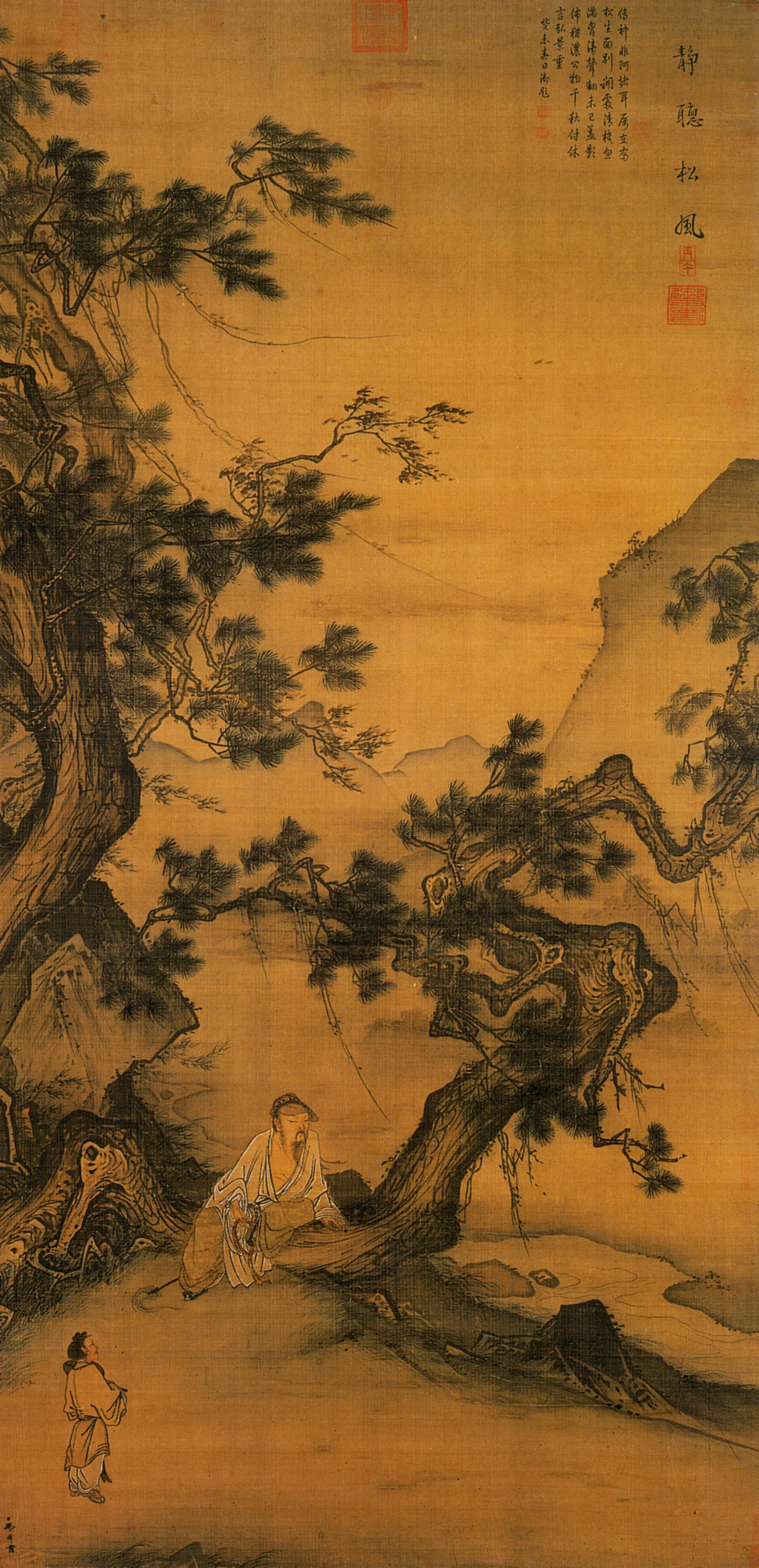
Listening to the Wind, by Ma Lin, 1246.

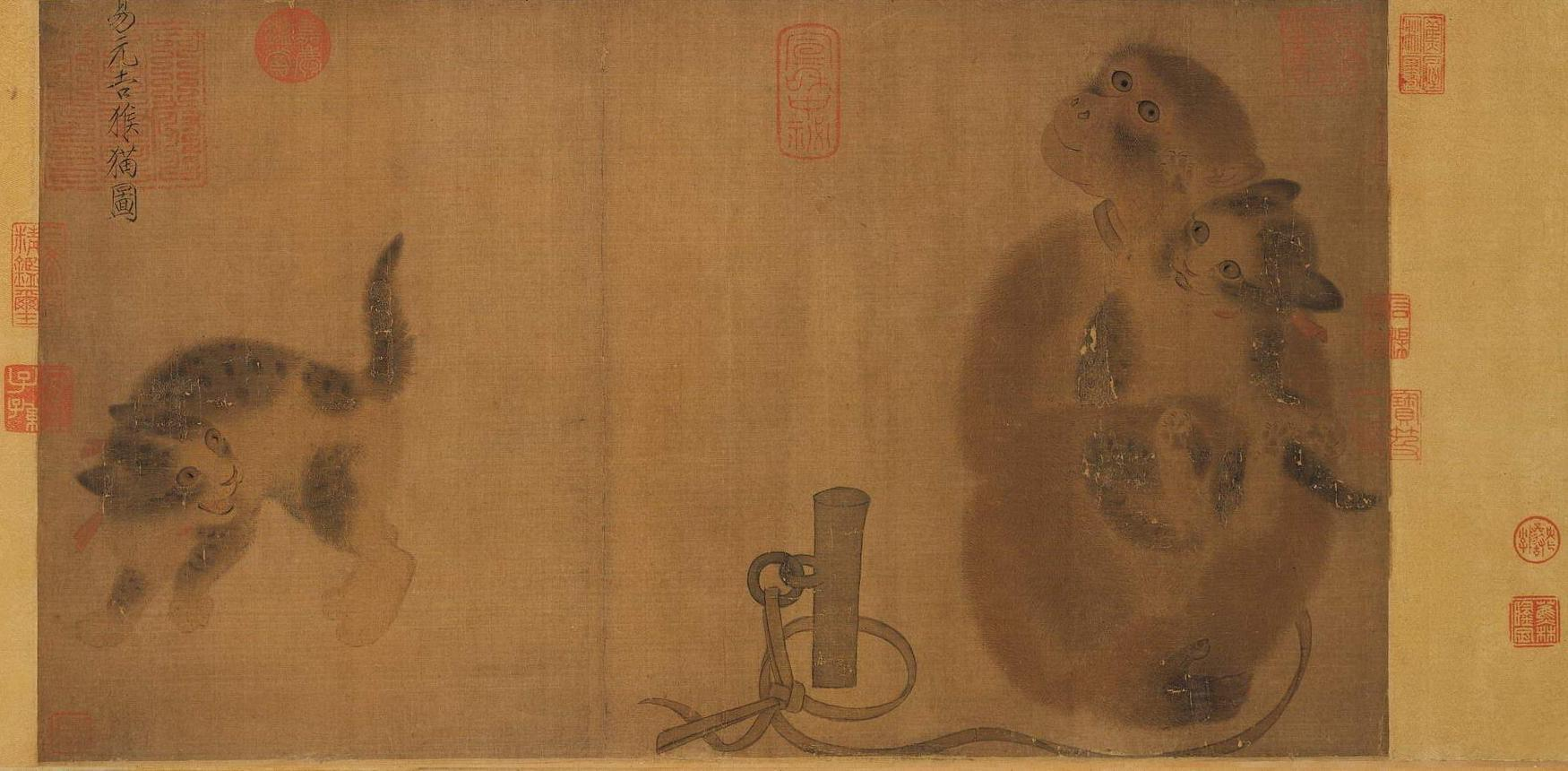
Monkey and cats, by Yi Yuanji, 11th century.

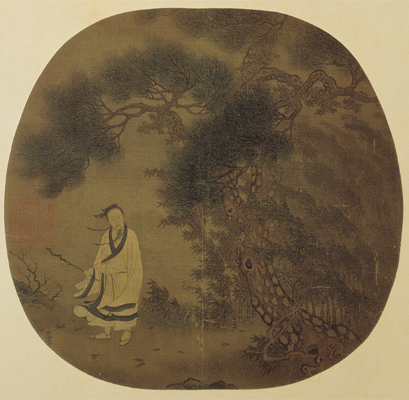
Holding a Wand Under the Pine Tree, by Xu Daoning, 11th century

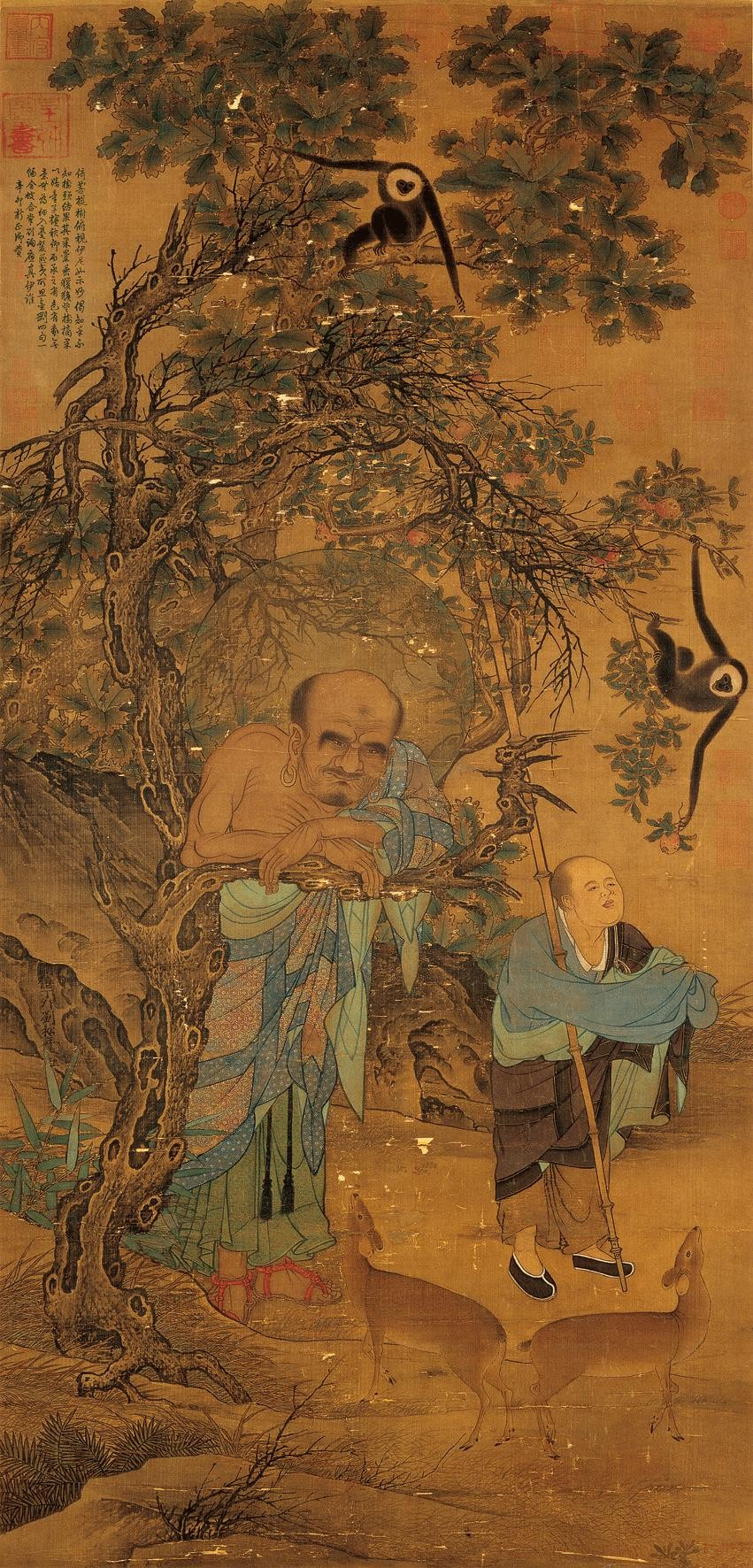
A Luohan, painted in 1207 by Liu Songnian, Southern Song period

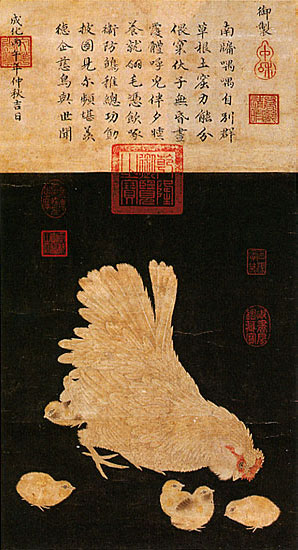
Mother Hen and Chicks, anonymous Song artist

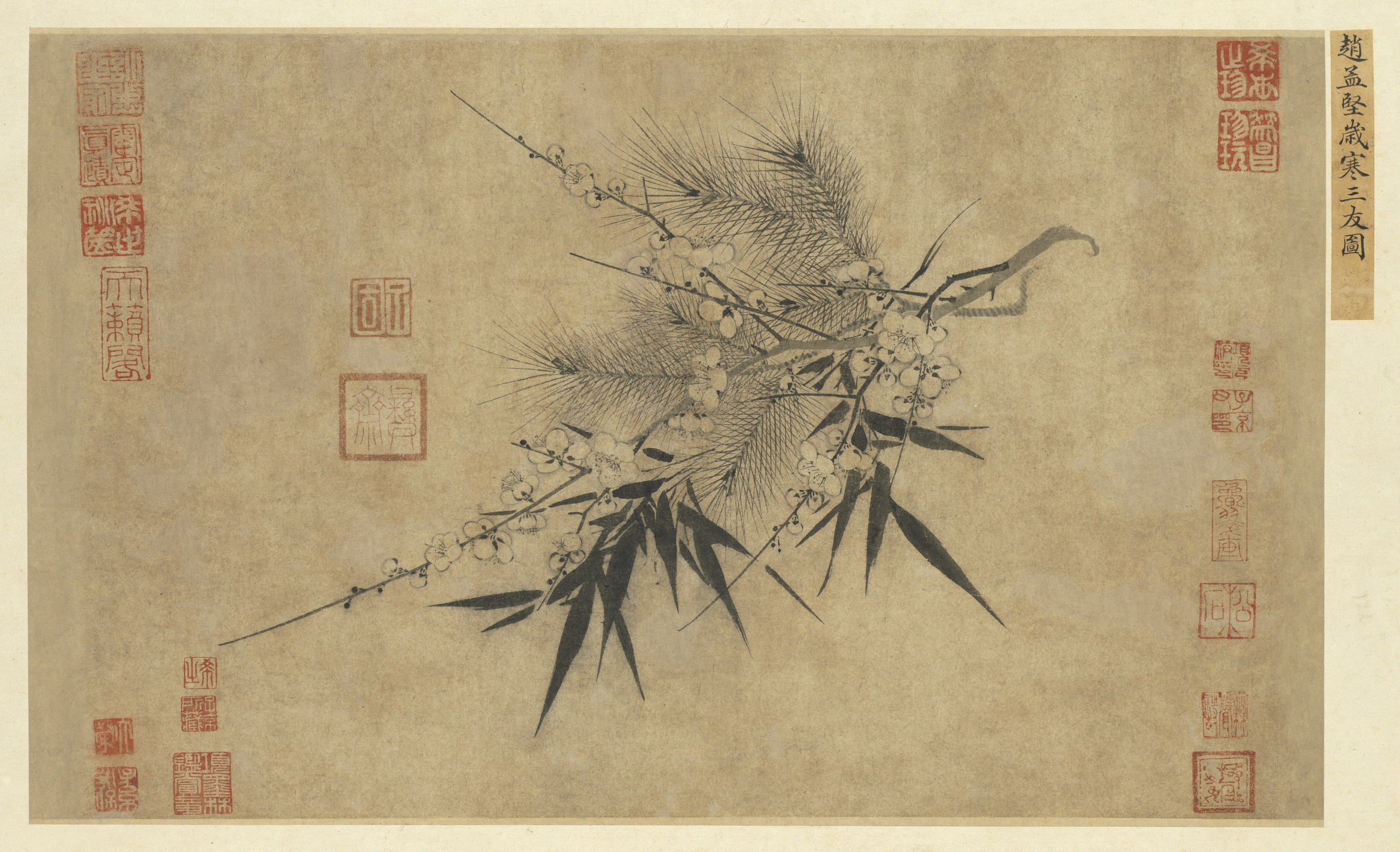
The Three Friends of Winter by Zhao Mengjian, c. 1199–1264

=== Ceramics ===
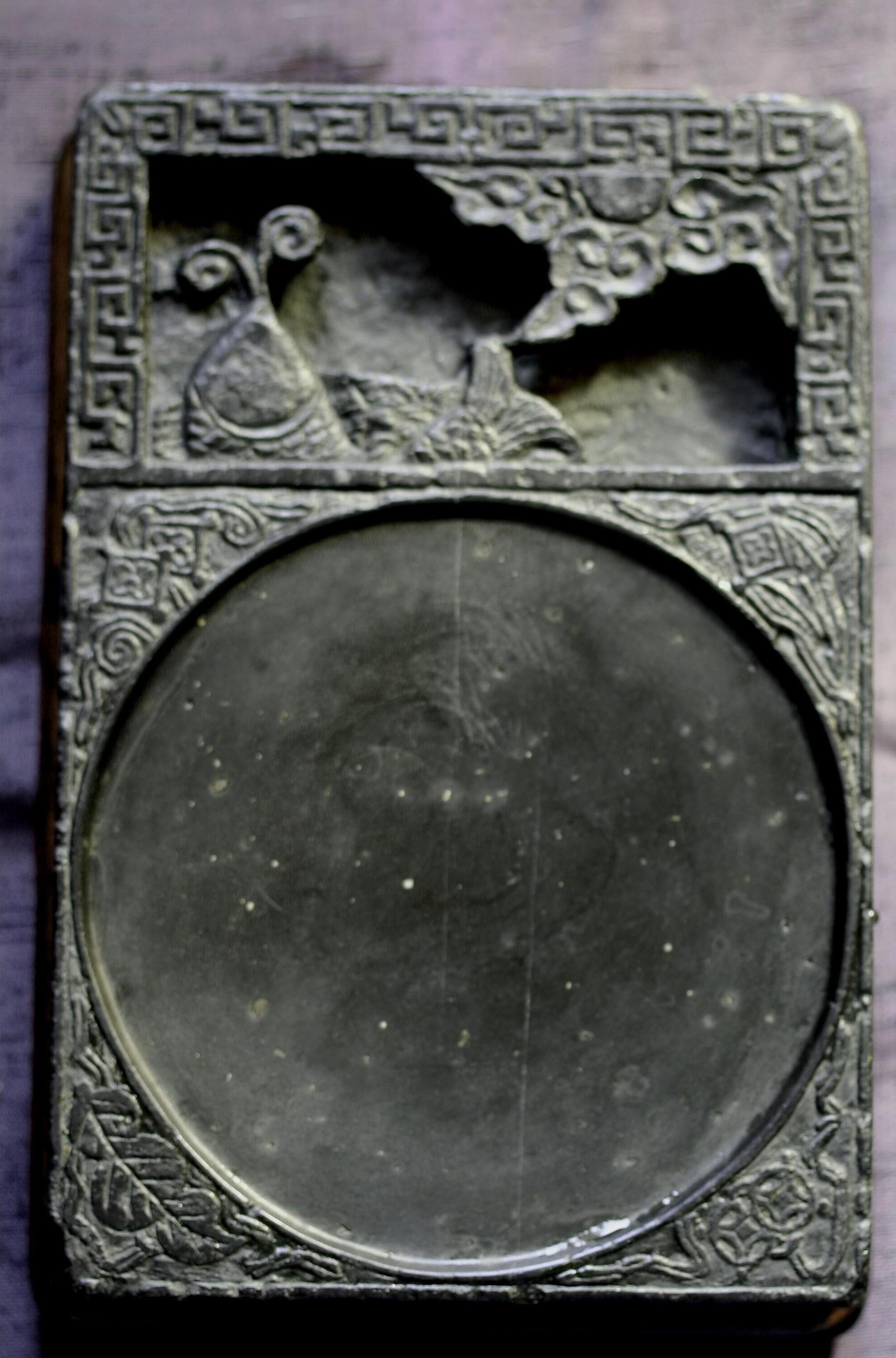
A Song dynasty Chinese inkstone with gold and silver markings, from the Nantoyōsō Collection, Japan

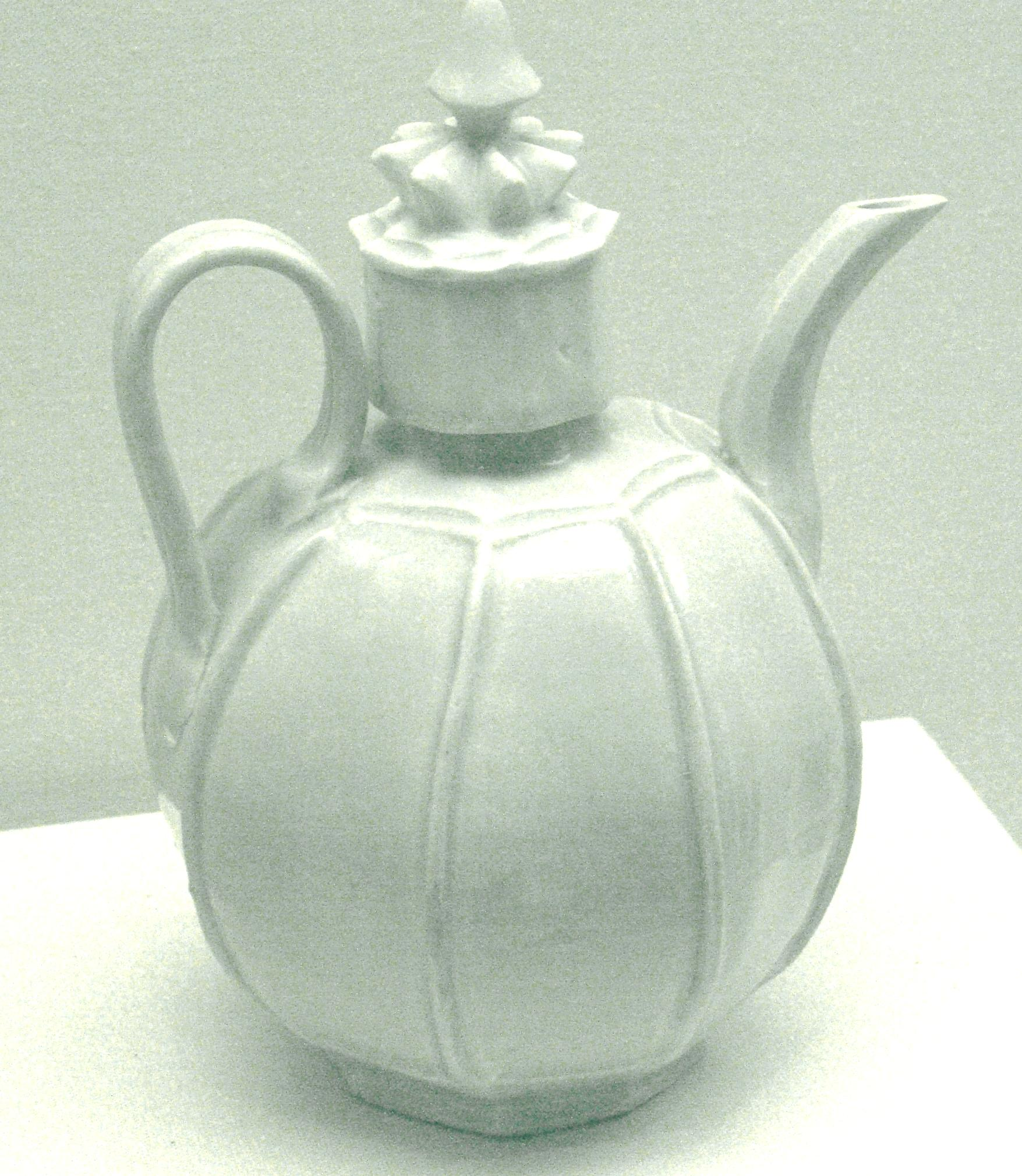
A Song teapot in the Qingbai style, from Jingdezhen.

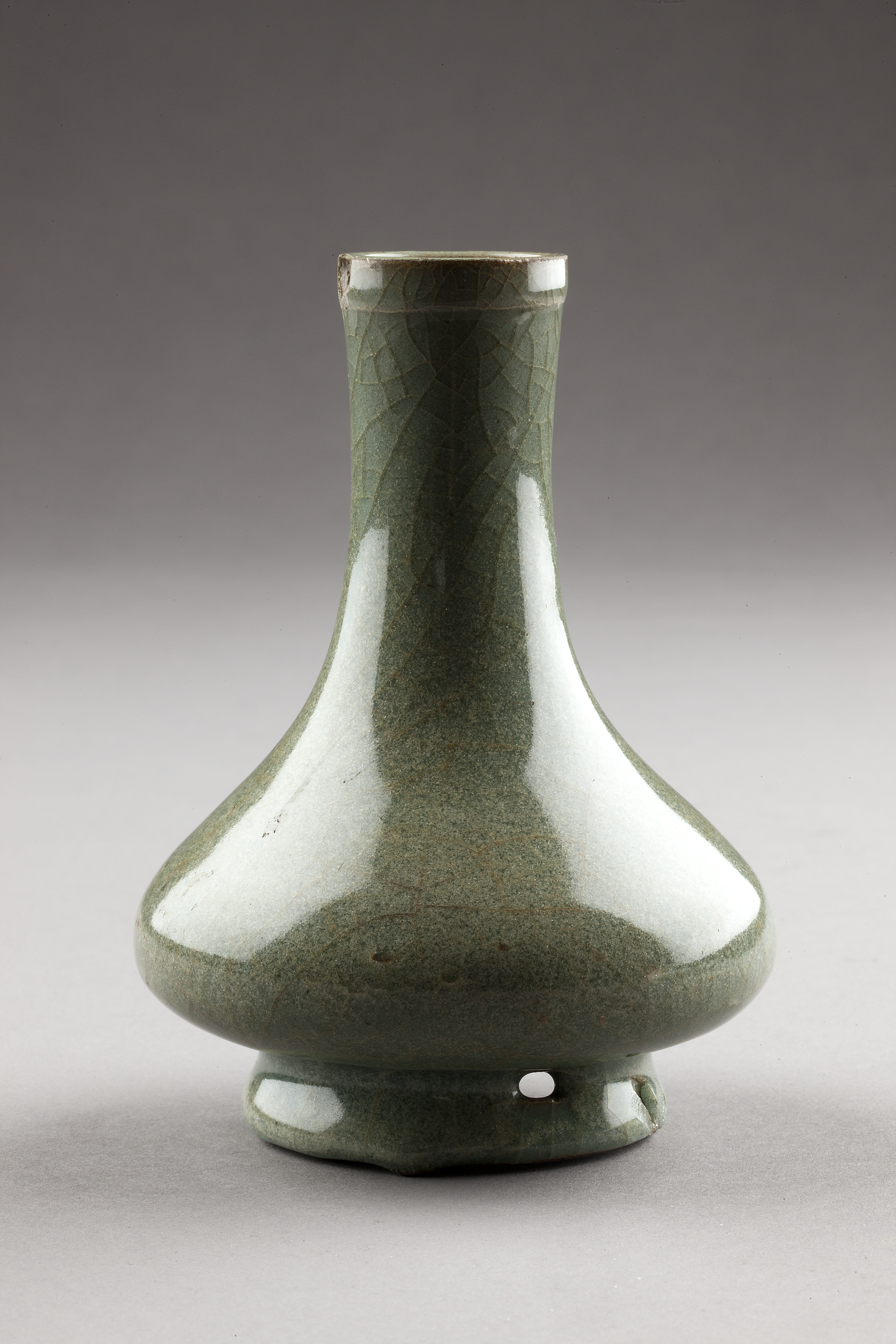
Longquan ware black stoneware vase with celadon glaze, Song dynasty.

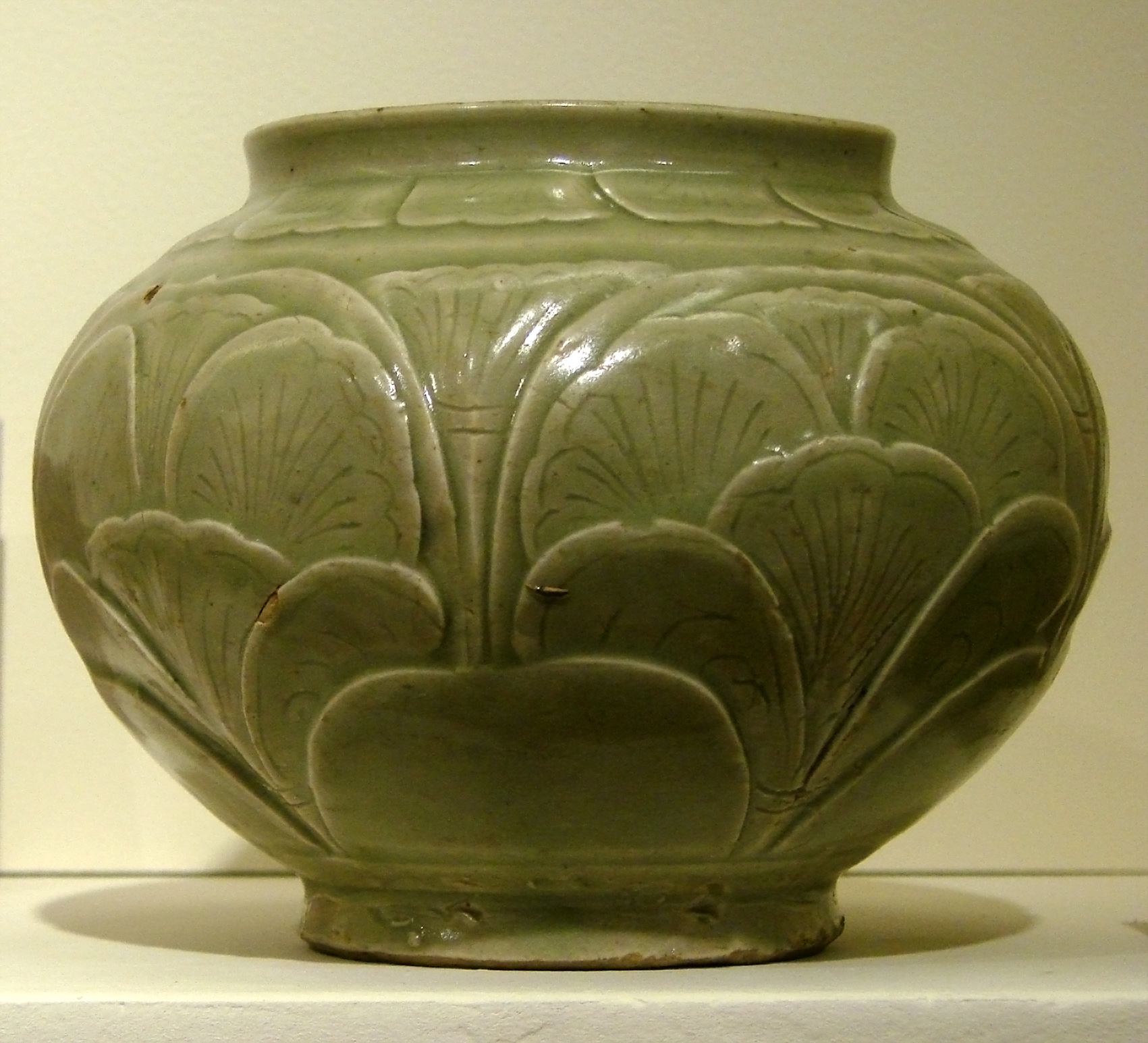
A cut and engraved sandstone and celadon jar from Yaozhou in Shaanxi, 10th–11th century.

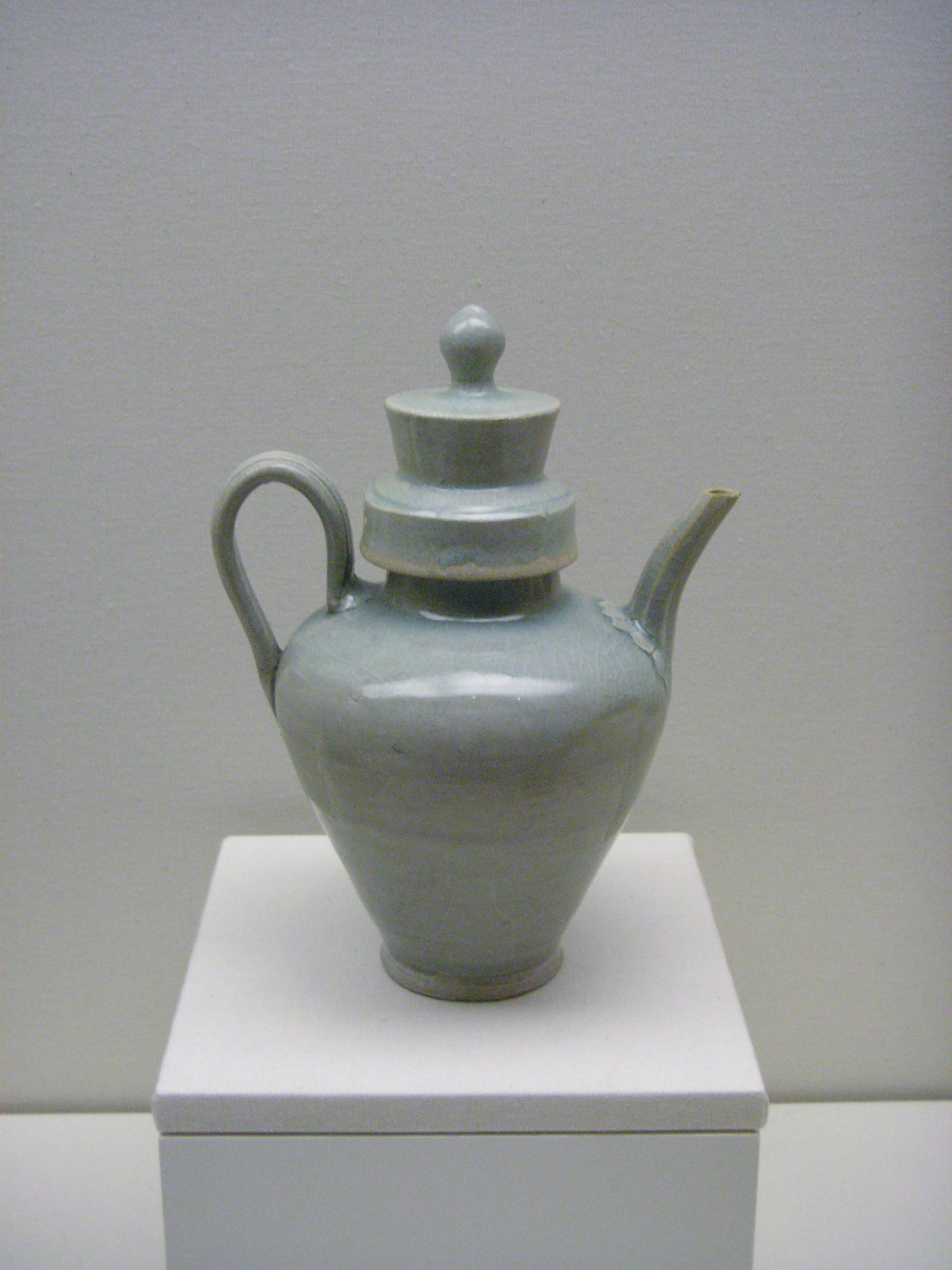
Stoneware with greenish glaze, Northern Song, 10th to 11th century.

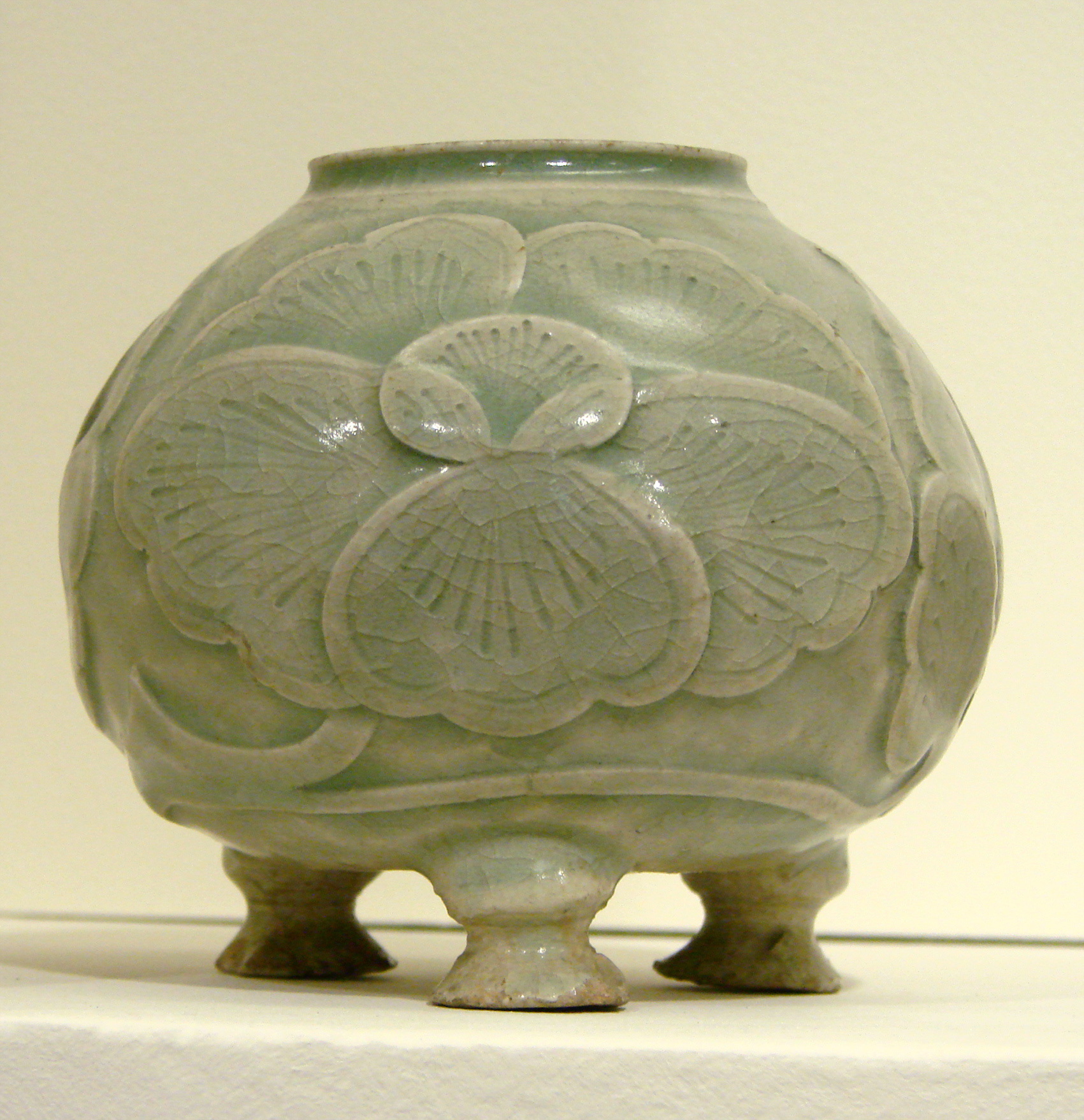
A small celadon tripod from Yaozhou in Shaanxi, dated to the late 10th century.

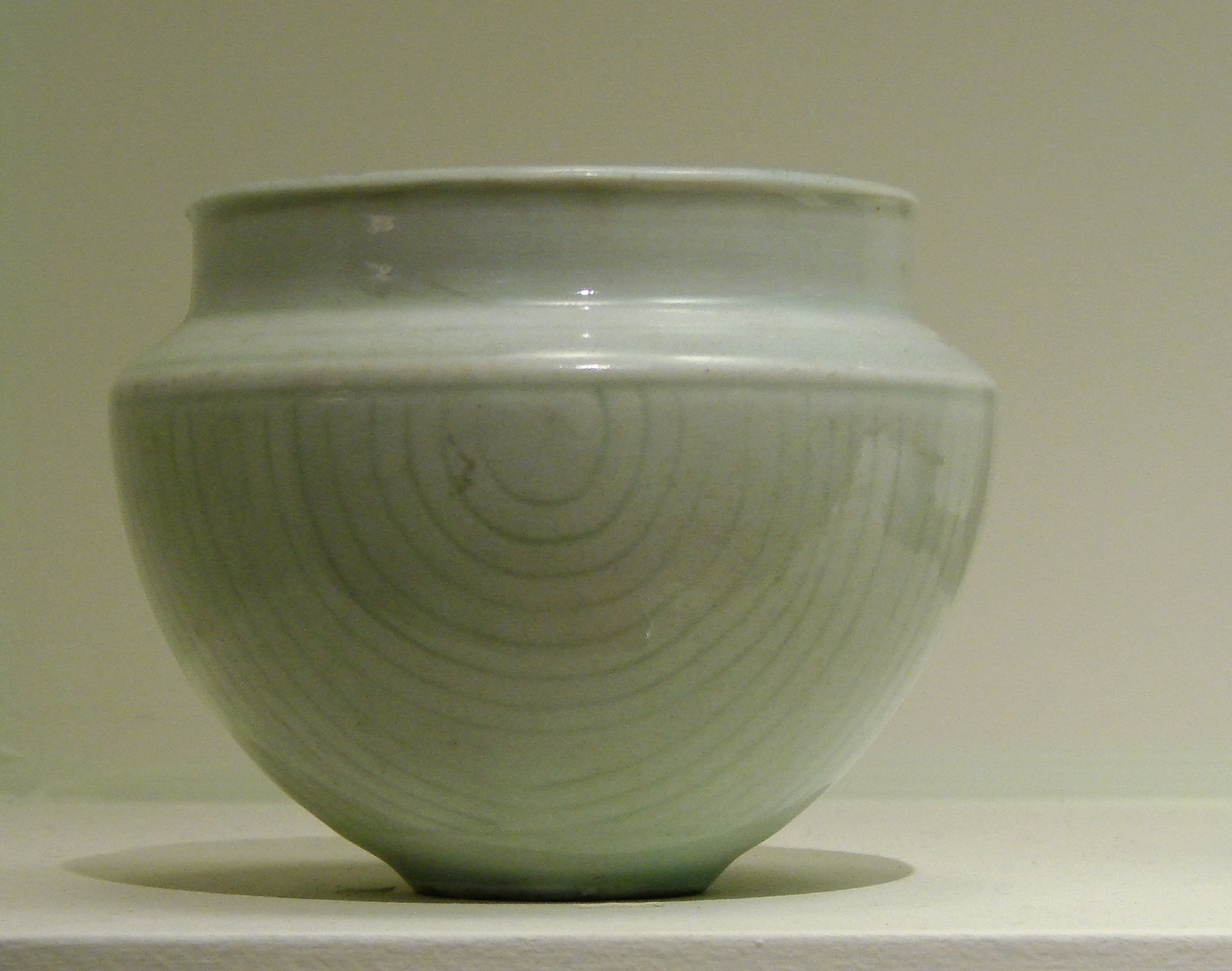
A small "qinbai" porcelain jar from Jingdezhen in Jiangxi, 11th–12th century.

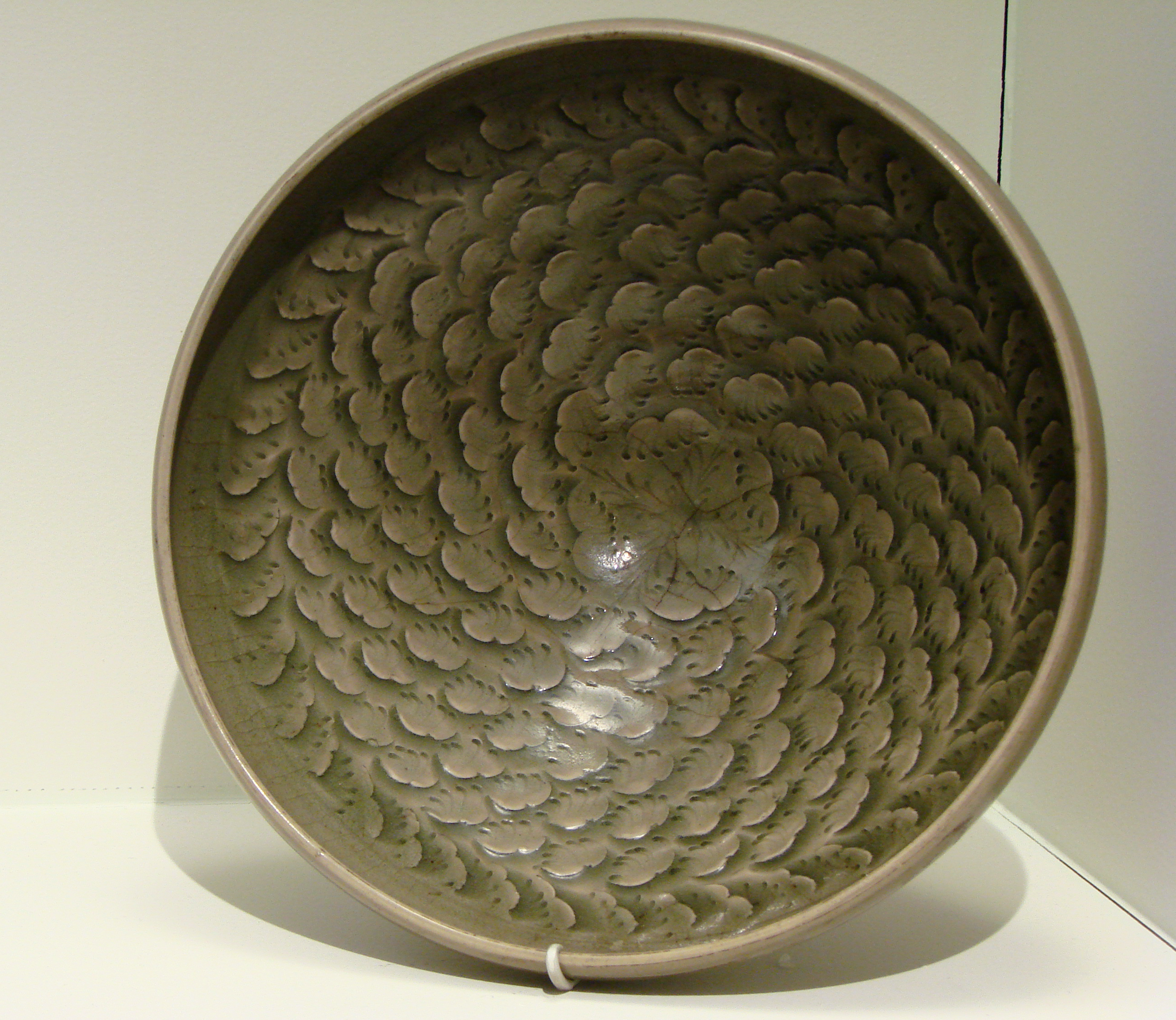
Gray sandstone dish with a celadon coating, decorated with a peony motif, from Yaozhou in Shaanxi, 11th–12th century.

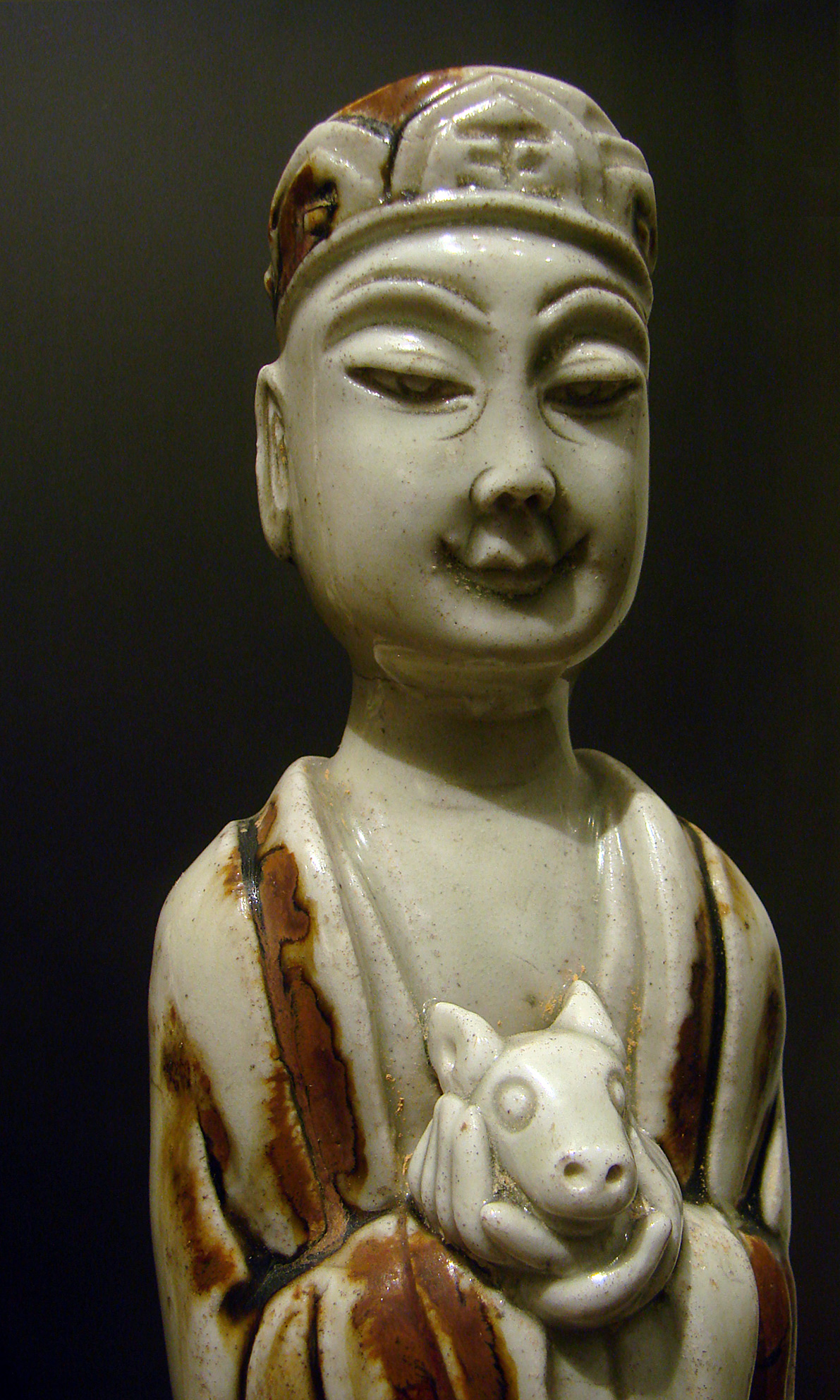
A funerary porcelain figurine in the personification of the Chinese zodiac, from Jingdezhen in Jiangxi, 12th century.

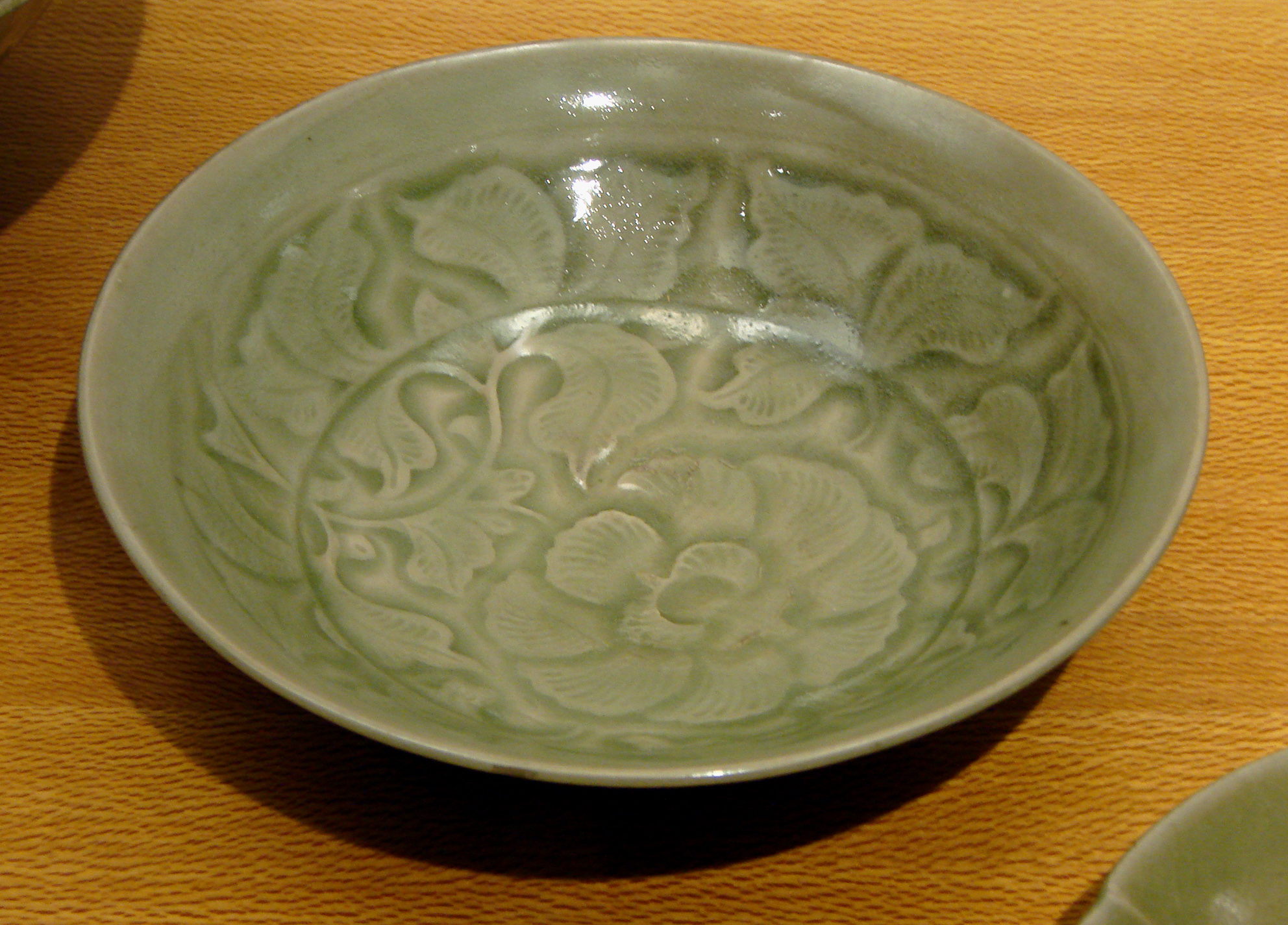
Celadon plate from Yaozhou in Shaanxi, 10th–11th century.

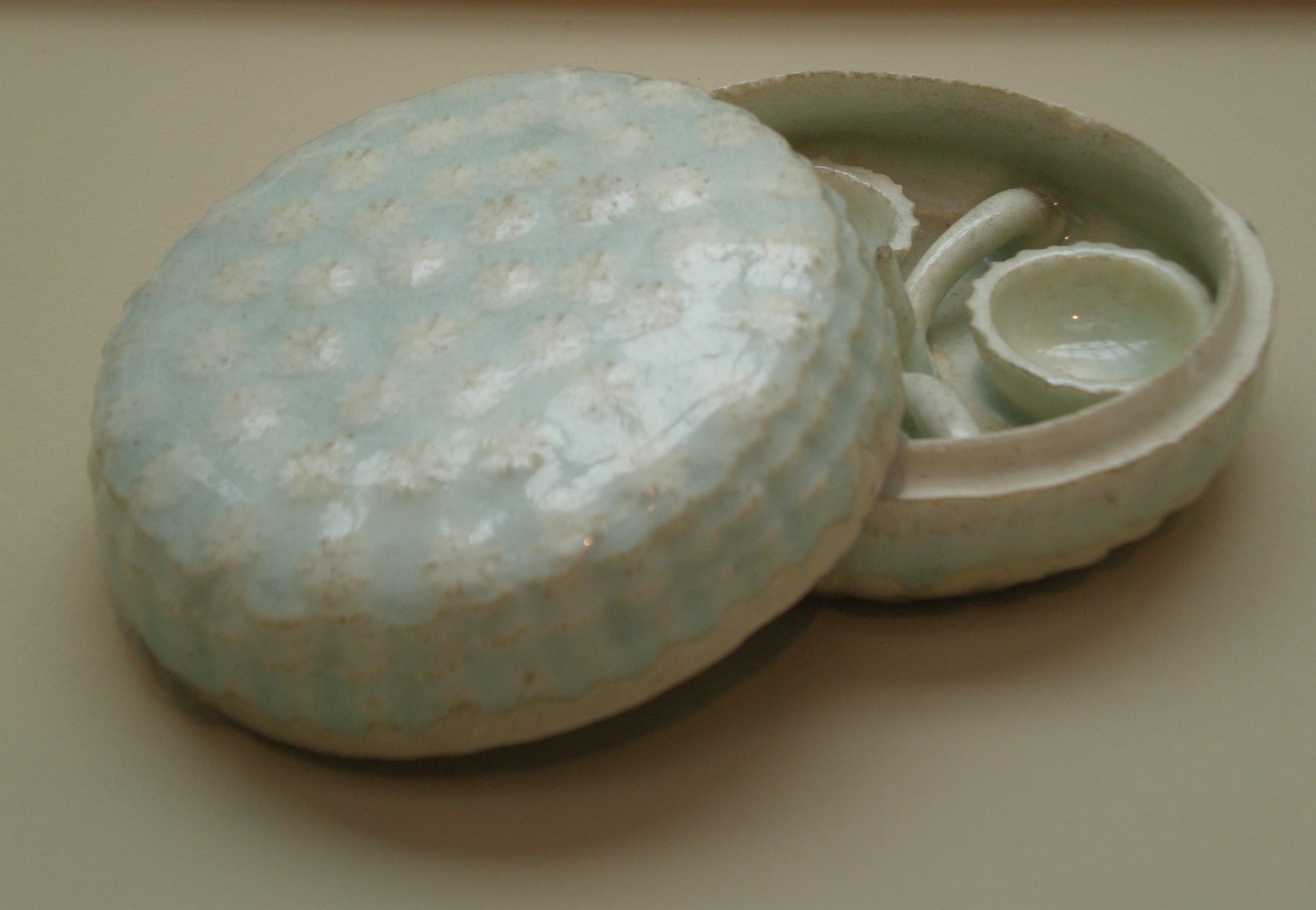
A Song ceramic box with floral medallions

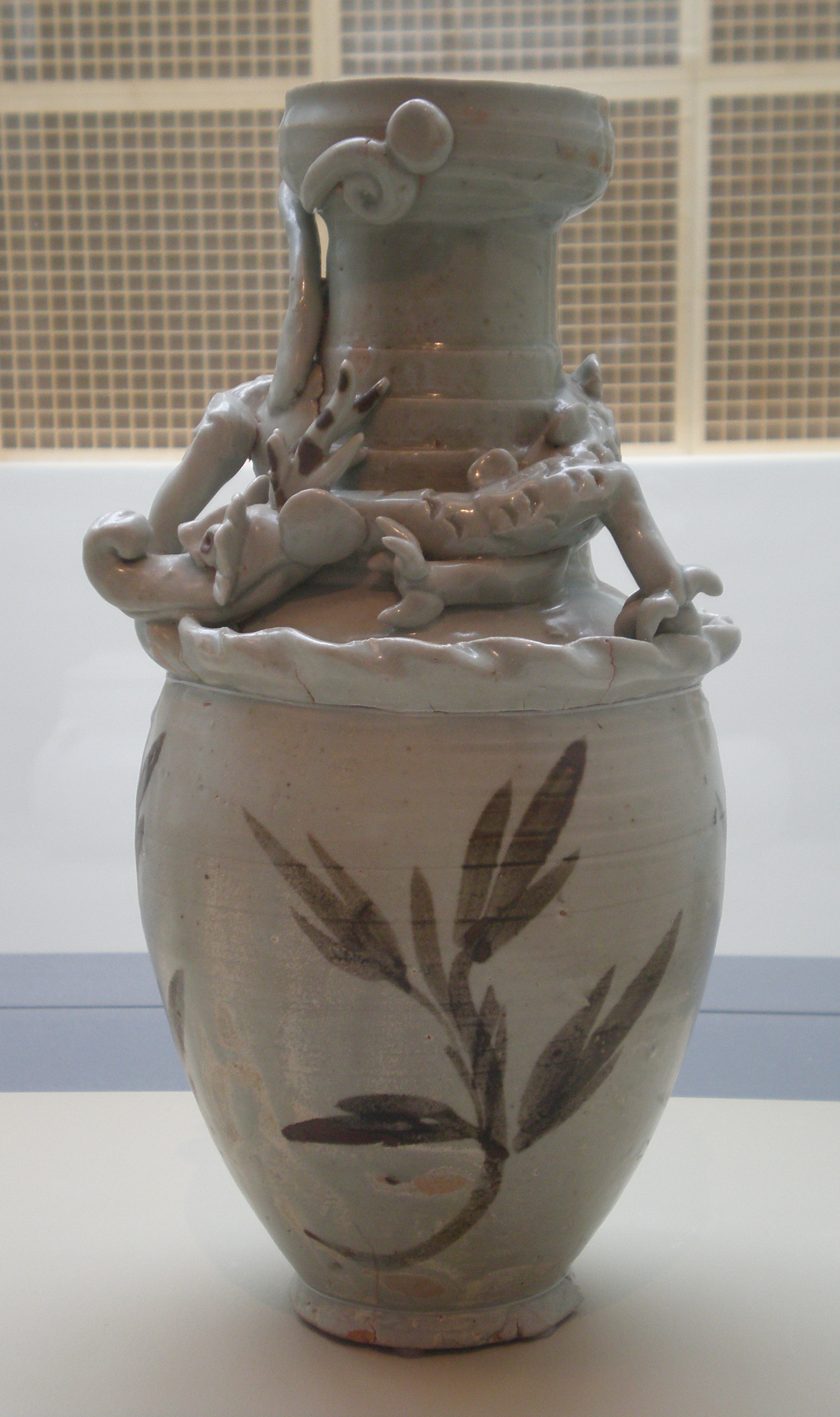
A Southern Song (1127–1279) vase with applied dragons and painted floral sprays

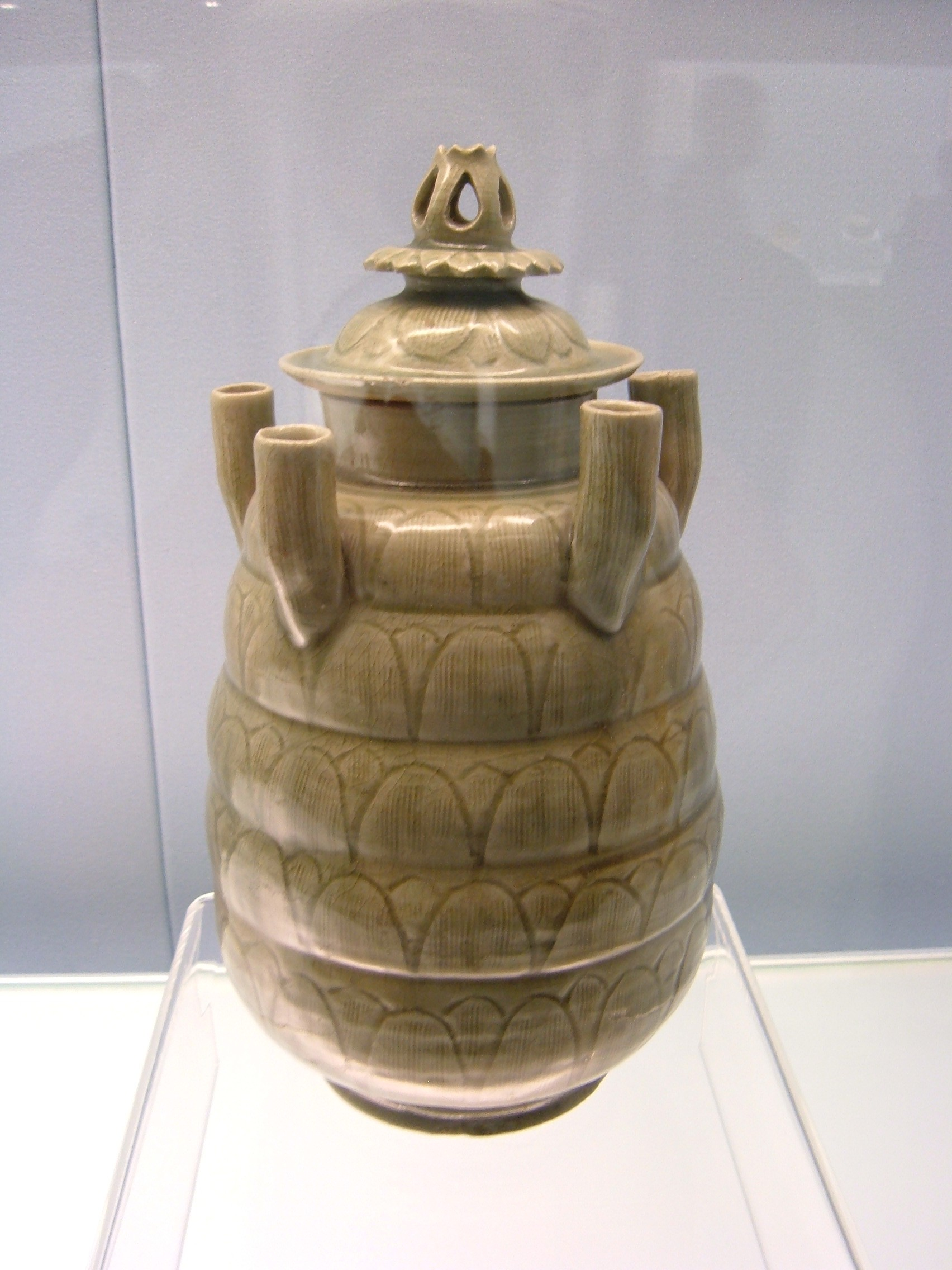
A Song five-tubed jar with lotus petal design, made of Longquan celadon

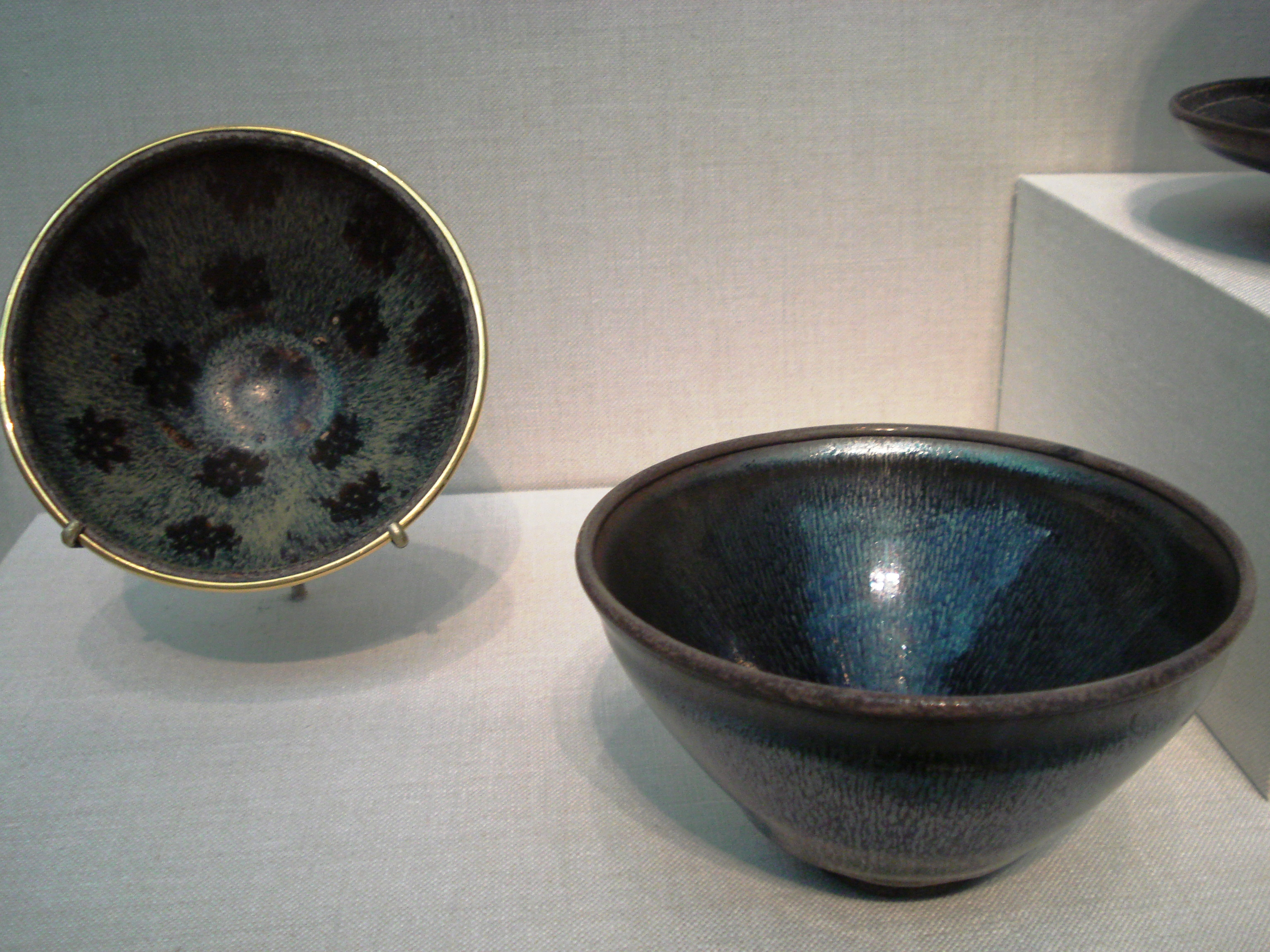
A pair of stoneware tea bowls from the Song

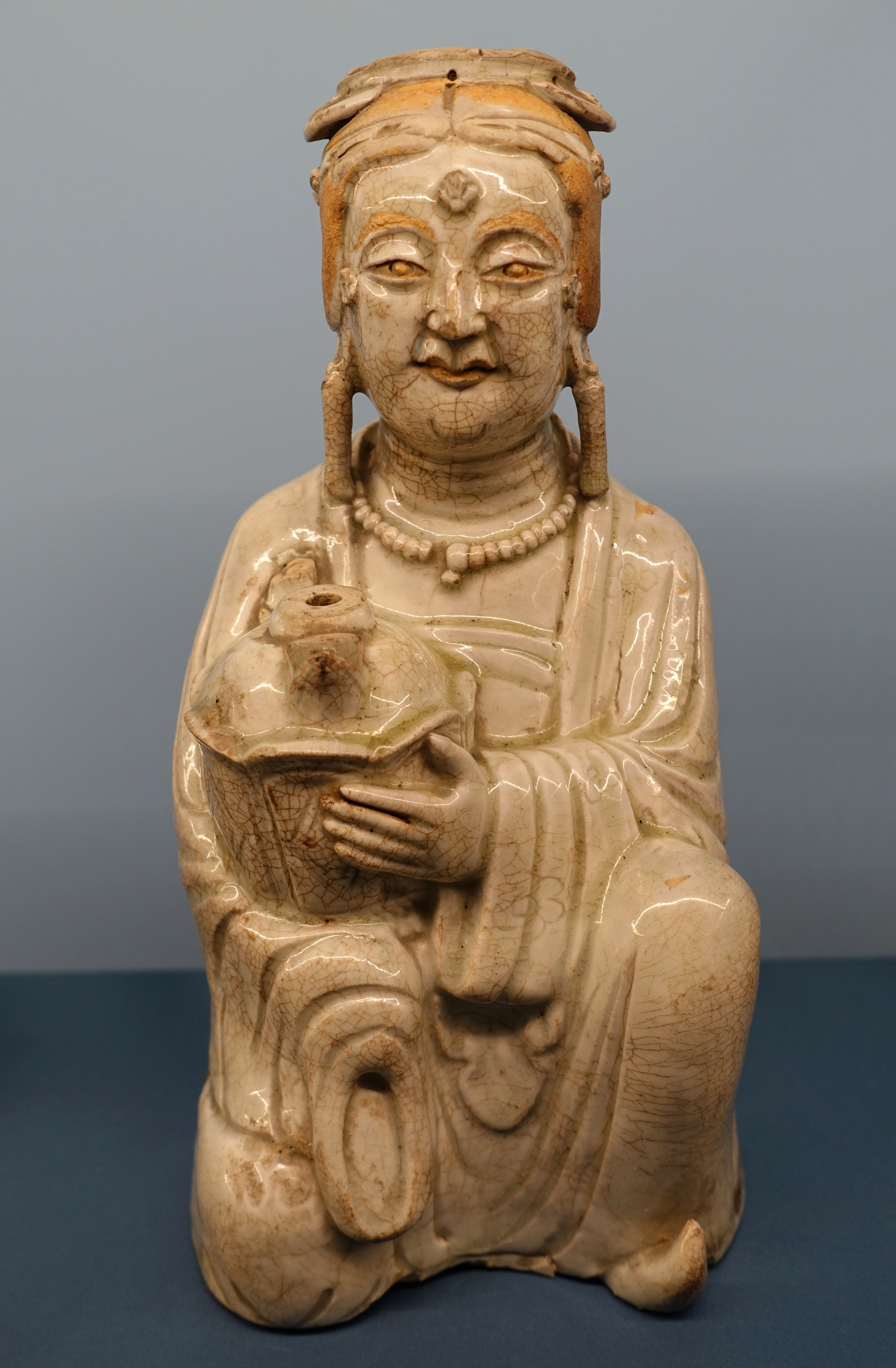
Bluish white glazed figurine, Northern Song period

=== Sculpture ===
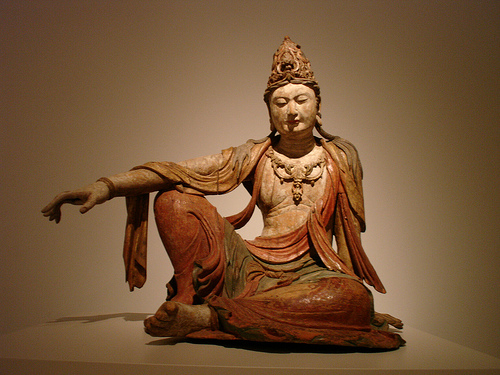
Seated Bodhisattva Avalokitesvara (Guanyin), wood and pigment, 11th century

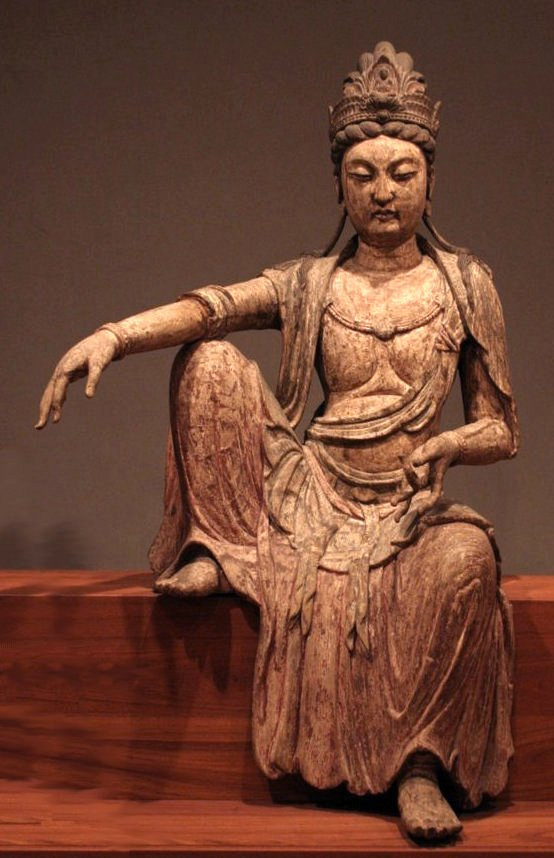
The bodhisattva Kuan-yan (Guanyin), Northern Song dynasty, China, c. 1025, wood

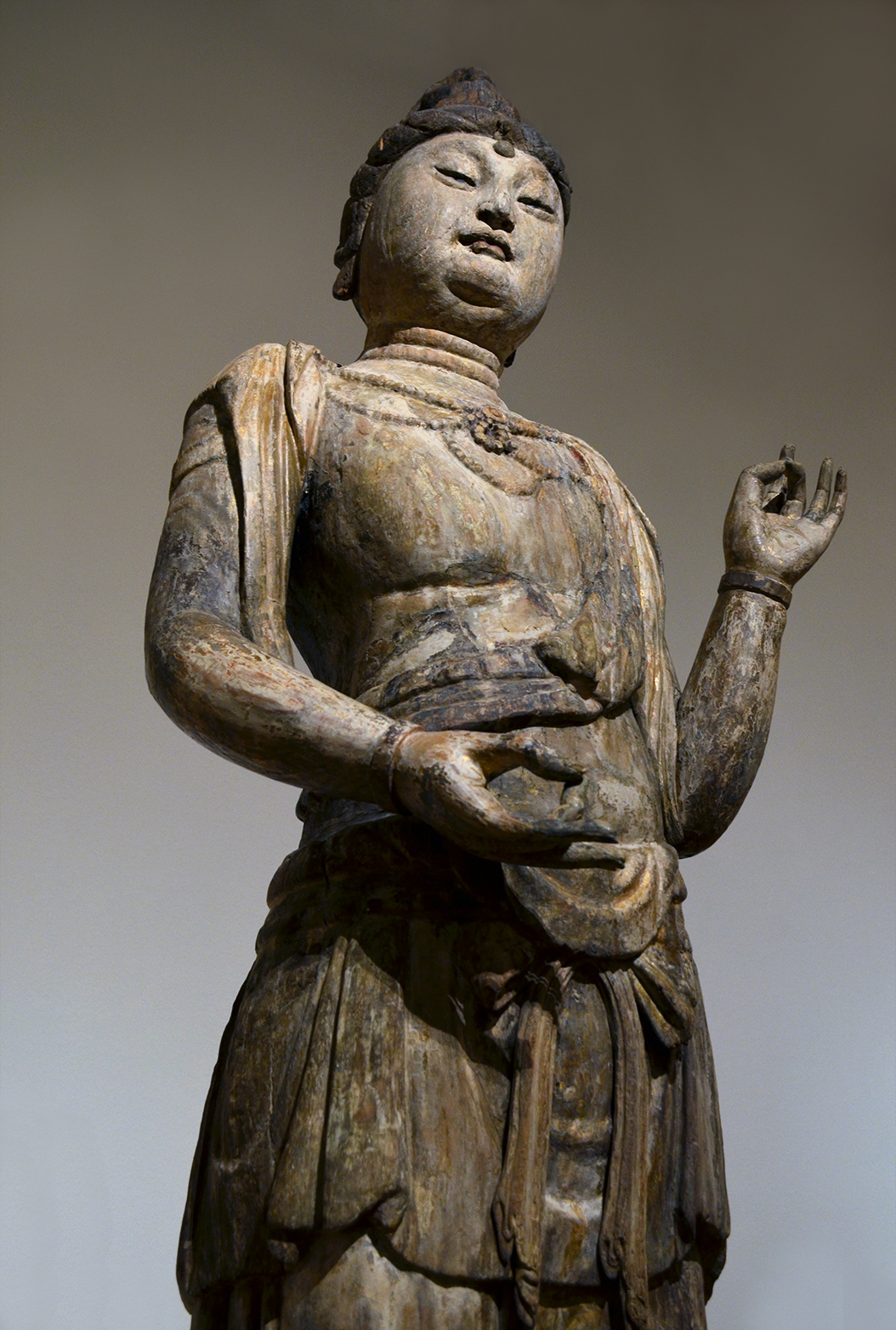
Bodhisattva, Song Dynasty, 11th–12th century

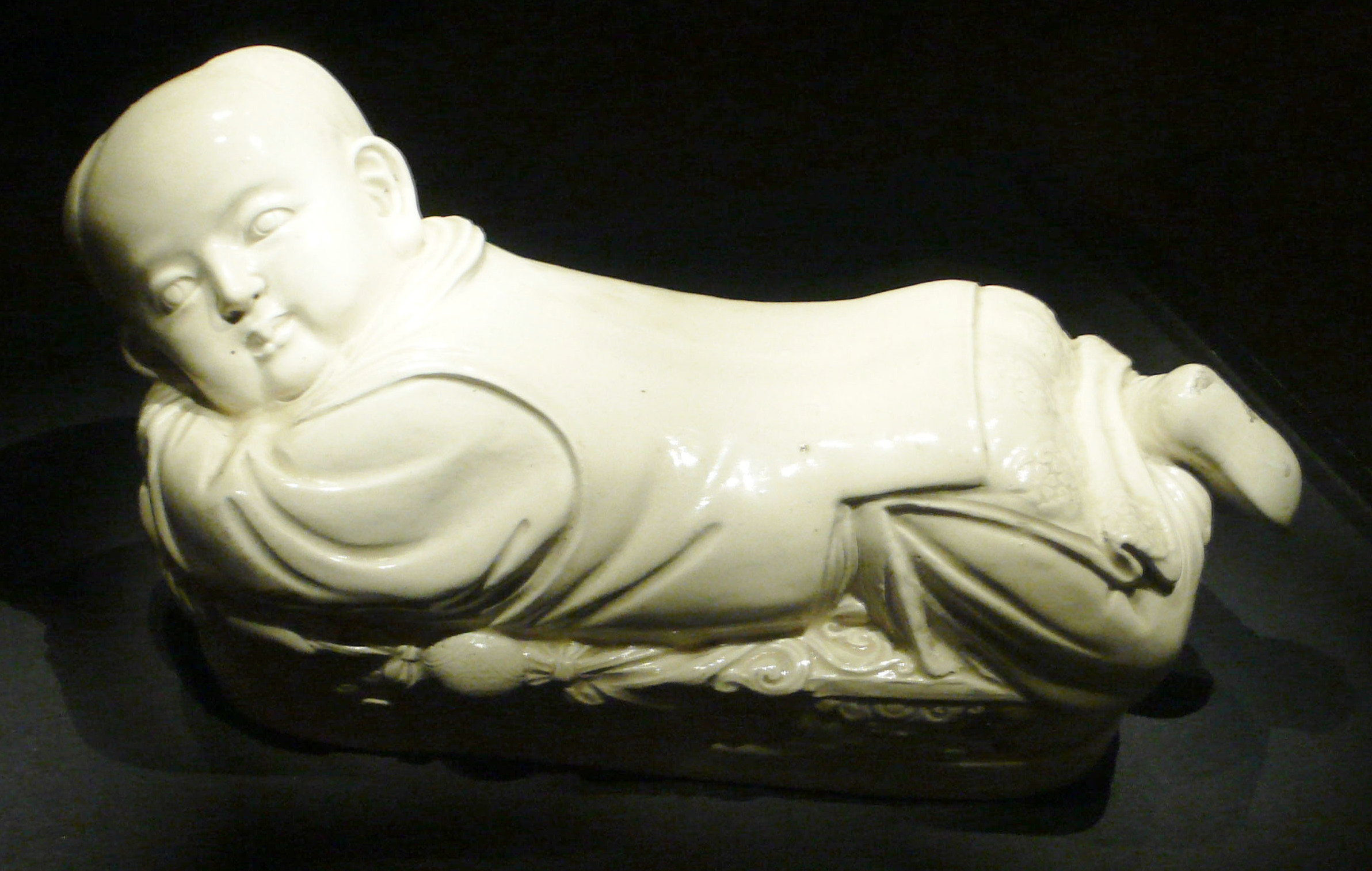
White-glazed pillow in the shape of an infant boy; ding ware, Northern Song Dynasty (960–1127)

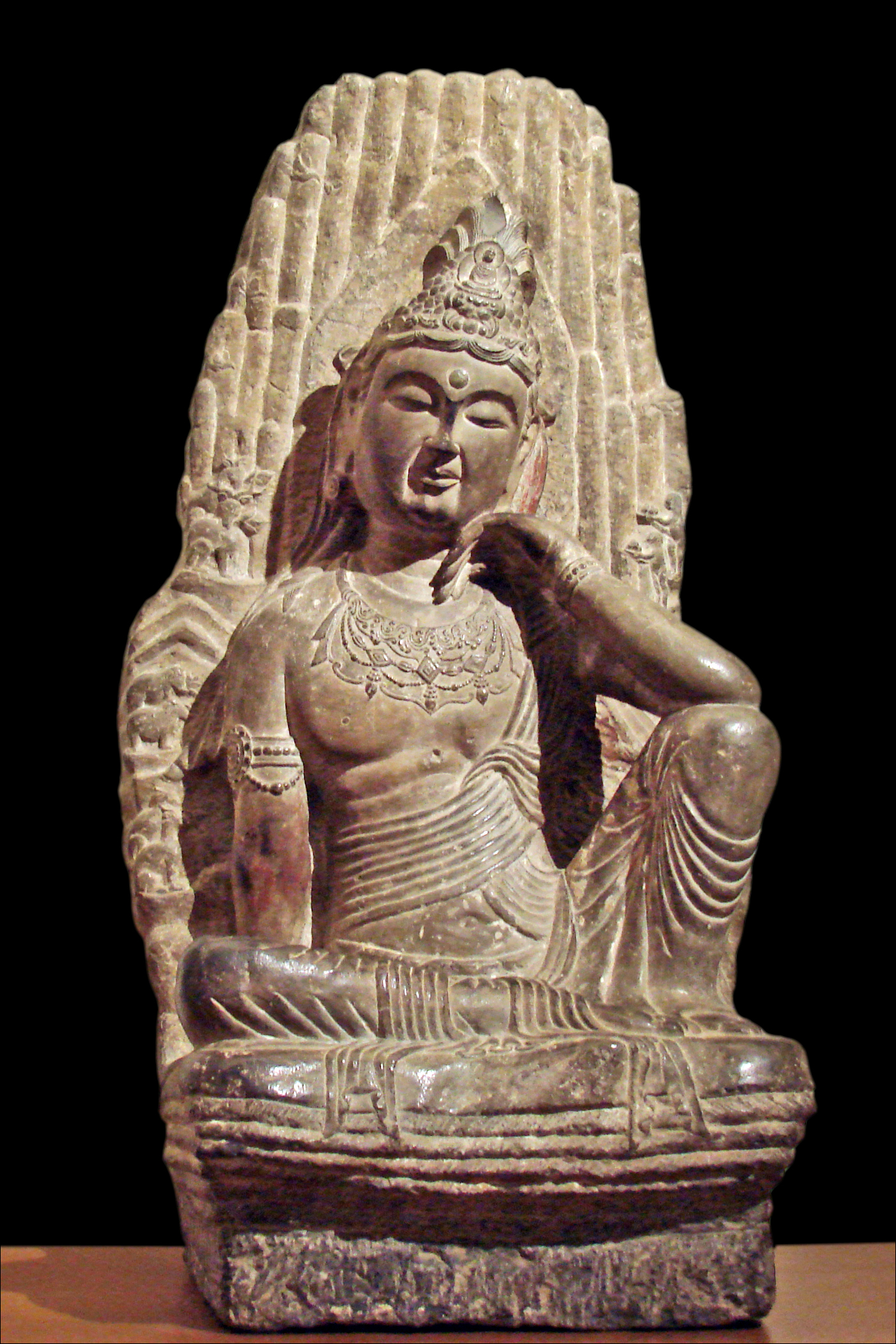
Bodhisattva Avalokitesvara (Guanyin), limestone, Song dynasty

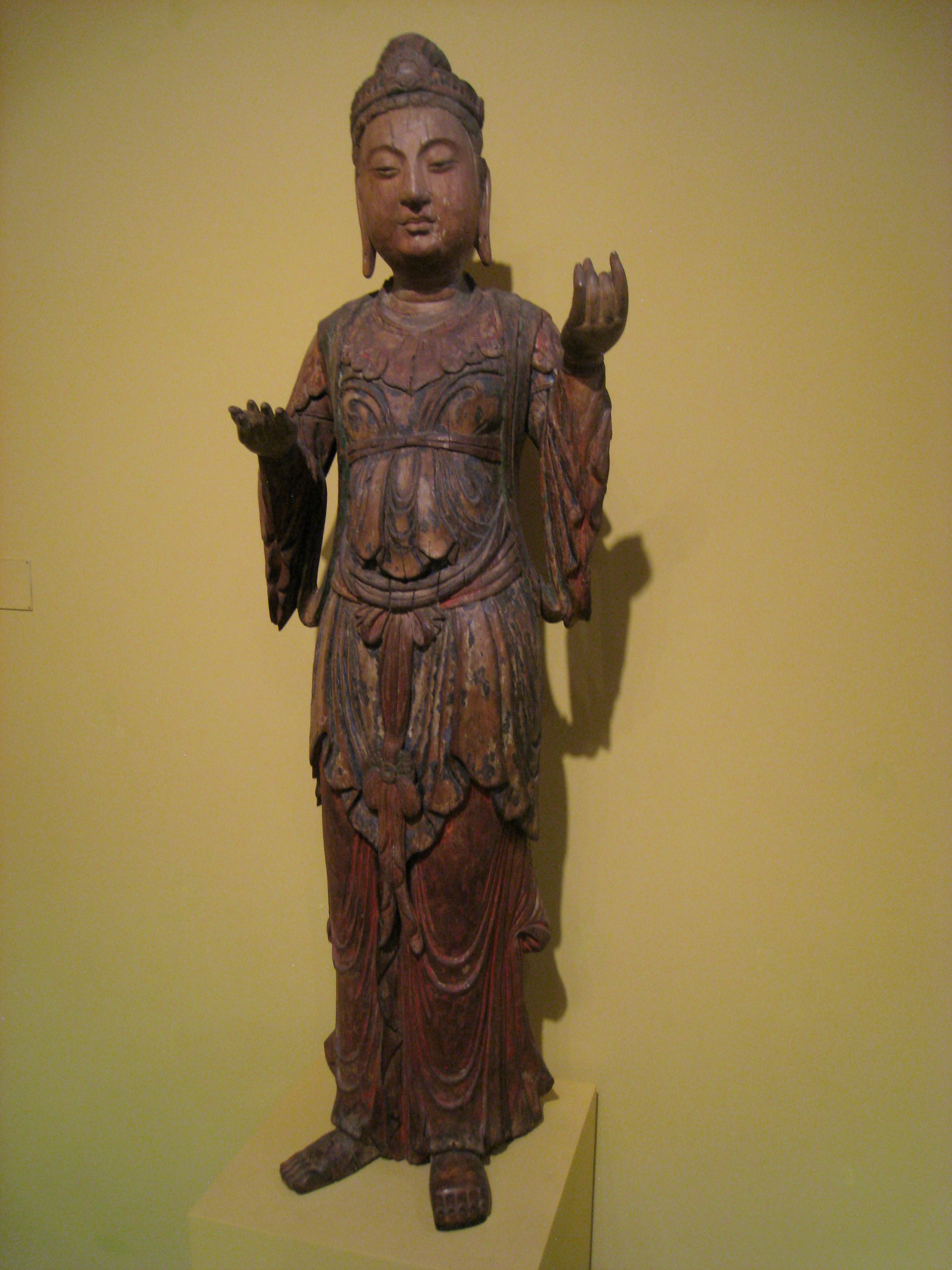
Standing Bodhisattva, China, Song dynasty, 12th century, painted wood

== Poetry and literature ==
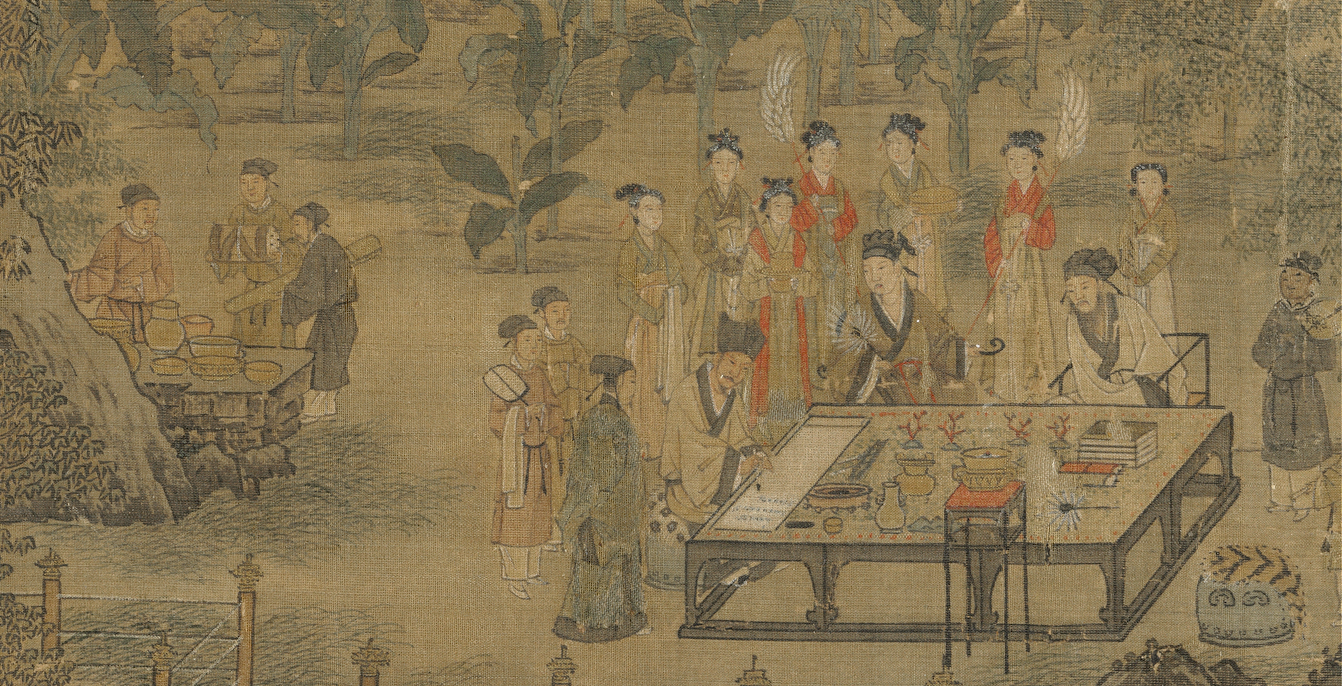
Scholars composing a poem in Elegant Gathering in the Western Garden, painting attributed to Liu Songnian.

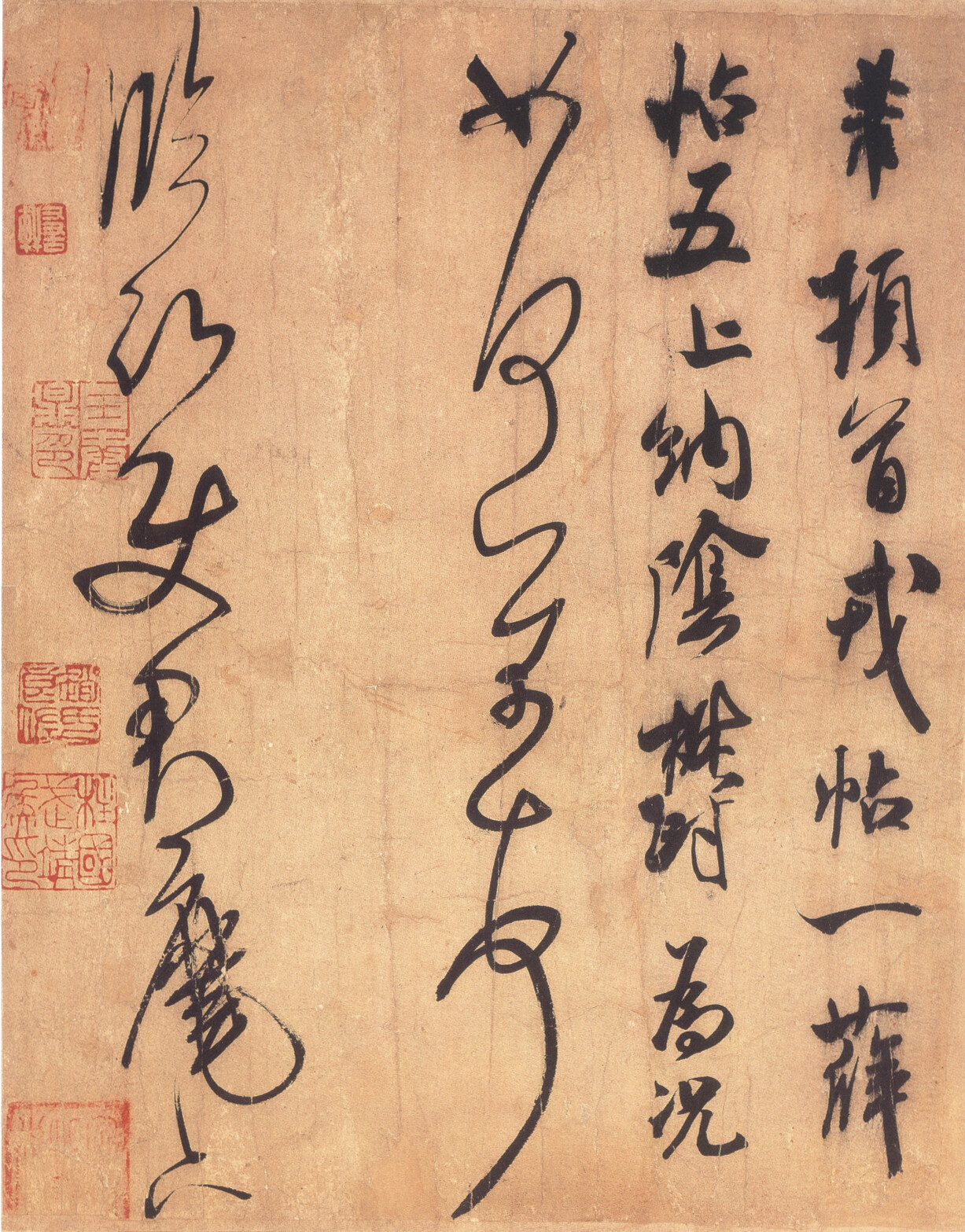
Chinese calligraphy of mixed styles written by Song dynasty poet Mi Fu (1051–1107)

Chinese literature during the Song period contained a range of many different genres and was enriched by the social complexity of the period. Although the earlier Tang dynasty is viewed as the zenith era for Chinese poetry (particularly the shi style poetry of Du Fu, Li Bai, Bai Juyi), there were important poetic developments by famous poets of the Song era, with the flourishing of the ci form being especially being associated with Song poetry. Song developments in poetry included the works of the social critic and pioneer of the "new subjective style" Mei Yaochen (1002–1060), the politically controversial yet renowned master Su Shi (1037–1101), the eccentric yet brilliant Mi Fu (1051–1107), the premier Chinese female poet Li Qingzhao (1084–1151), and many others. Although having roots in the Liang dynasty (502–557 AD), and further development during the brief existence of the Southern Tang immediate preceding the Song, the ci form of Chinese poetry found its greatest acceptance and popularity during the Song dynasty, and was used by most Song poets. The high court Chancellor Fan Zhongyan (989–1052), ardent Neo-Confucian Ouyang Xiu (1007–1072), the great calligrapher Huang Tingjian (1045–1105), and the military general Xin Qiji (1140–1207) were especially known for their ci poetry, amongst many others. The great ci poet Li Yu (who ruled the Southern Tang under the name Li Houzhu) wrote some of his most famous works during his time as a prisoner at the first Song court, following the demise of his former kingdom: Li Yu is an important transitional figure, sometimes considered to be the first major Song poet, and sometimes acclaimed as the last major Tang poet.

Historiography in literature remained prominent during the Song, as it had in previous ages and would in successive ages of China. Along with Song Qi, the essayist and historian Ouyang Xiu were responsible for compiling the New Book of Tang by 1060, covering the history of the Tang dynasty. Chancellor Sima Guang (1019–1086), the political nemesis of Wang Anshi (1021–1086), was responsible for heading a team of scholars that compiled the enormous historical work of the Zizhi Tongjian, a universal history completed in 1084 AD with a total of over 3 million written Chinese characters in 294 volumes. It covered the major themes and intricate nuances of Chinese history from 425 BC during the Warring States all the way up to the 10th century and the fall of the Tang. In 1189 it was compiled and condensed into fifty-nine books by Zhu Xi (1130–1200), while this project was totally complete with the efforts of his disciples around the time of his death in 1200.

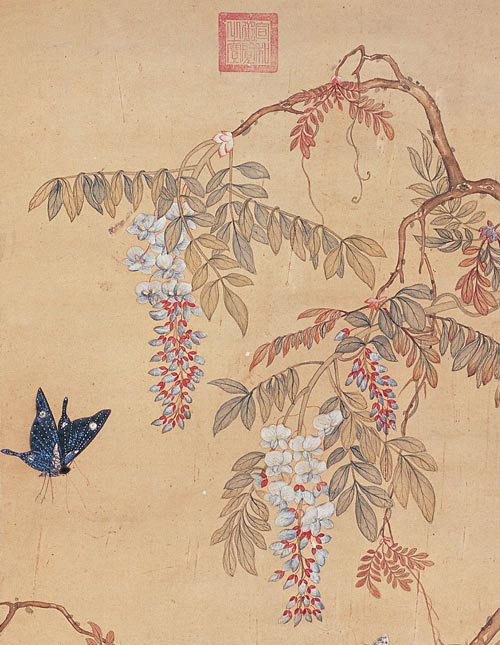
A butterfly and wisteria flowers, by Xü Xi (c. 886 – c. 975), painted around 970

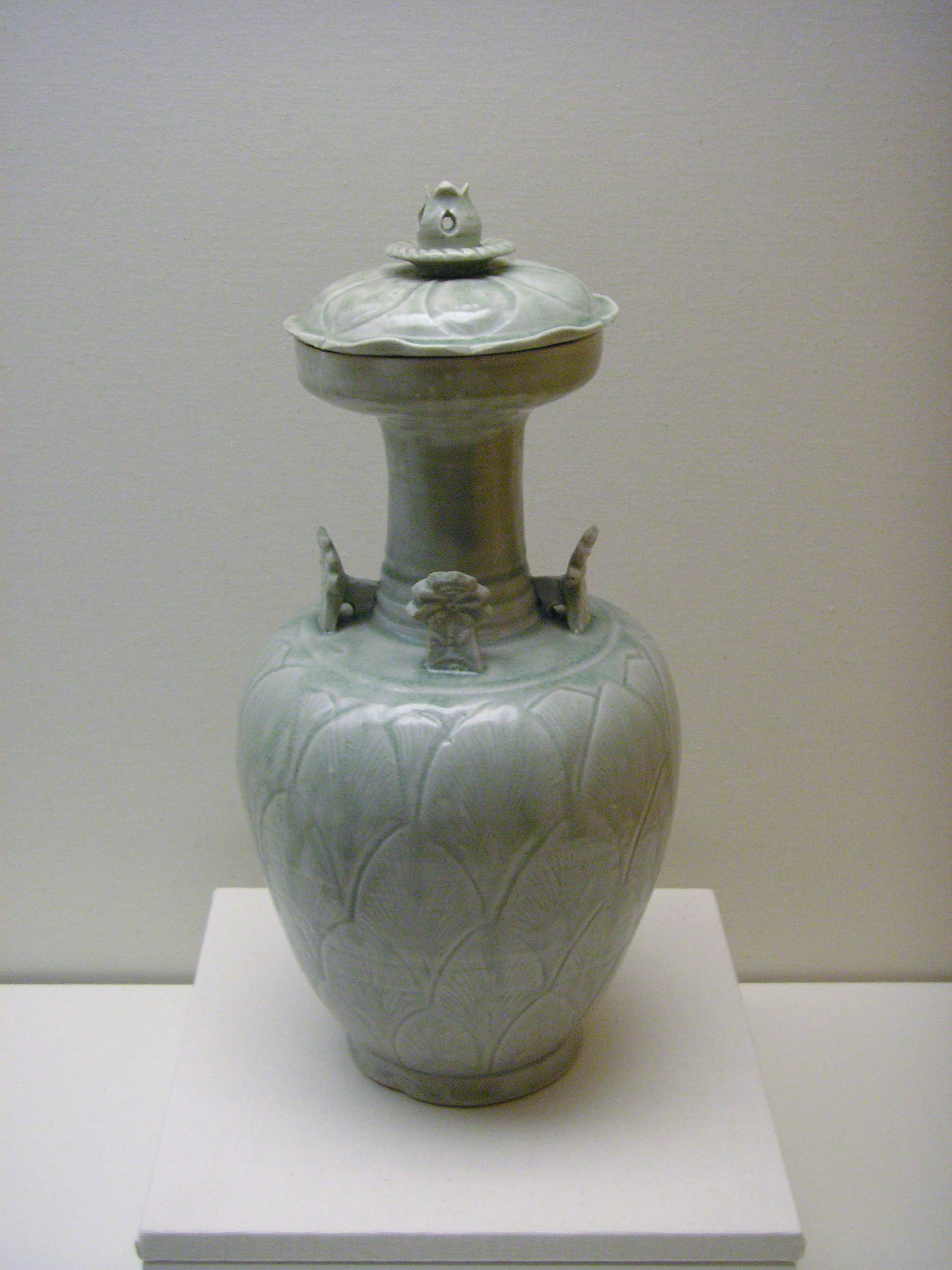
Funerary vase and cover, stoneware in the Longquan celadon style; from Zhejiang province, Northern Song era, 10th or 11th century.

There were also very large encyclopedic works written in the Song period, such as the Four Great Books of Song compiled first by Li Fang in the 10th century and fully edited by the time of Cefu Yuangui in the 11th century. The largest of these was the 1013 publication of the Prime Tortoise of the Record Bureau, a massive encyclopedia consisting of 9.4 million written Chinese characters divided into 1000 volumes. There were also rhyme dictionaries written during the Song dynasty, such as the Jiyun of 1037. Although Neo-Confucianism became dominant over Buddhism in China during this period, there was still a significant amount of Buddhist literature. For example, there was the collection of Zen Buddhist kōans in the Blue Cliff Record of 1125, which was expanded by Yuanwu Keqin (1063–1135). 'Travel record literature' ('youji wenxue') was also a popular category of literature during the Song period, which was accounts of one's own travel experiences typically written in narrative or prose styles, and included authors such as Fan Chengda (1126–1193). A great example of Chinese travel literature in the Song period would be Su Shi's (1037–1101) Record of Stone Bell Mountain.

There were many technical and scientific writings during the Song period. The two most eminent authors of the scientific and technical fields were Shen Kuo (1031–1095) and his contemporary Su Song (1020–1101). Shen Kuo published his Dream Pool Essays in 1088 AD, an enormous encyclopedic book that covered a wide range of subjects, including literature, art, military strategy, mathematics, astronomy, meteorology, geology, geography, metallurgy, engineering, hydraulics, architecture, zoology, botany, agronomy, medicine, anthropology, archeology, and more. As for Shen Kuo's equally brilliant peer, Su Song created a celestial atlas of five different star maps, wrote the 1070 AD pharmaceutical treatise of the Ben Cao Tu Jing (Illustrated Pharmacopoeia), which had the related subjects of botany, zoology, metallurgy, and mineralogy, and wrote his famous horological treatise of the Xin Yi Xiang Fa Yao in 1092 AD, which described in full detail his ingenious astronomical clock tower constructed in the capital city of Kaifeng. Although these two figures were perhaps the greatest technical authors in their field during the time, there were many others. For producing textiles, Qin Guan's book of 1090 AD, the Can Shu (Book of Sericulture), included description of a silk-reeling machine that incorporated the earliest known use of the mechanical belt drive in order to function. In the literary field of agronomy, there was the Jiu Huang Huo Min Shu (The Rescue of the People; a Treatise on Famine Prevention and Relief) edited by Dong Wei in the 12th century, the Cha Lu (Record of Tea) written by Cai Xiang in 1060 AD, the Zhu Zi Cang Fa (Master Zhu on Managing Communal Granaries) written by Zhu Xi in 1182 AD, and many others. There were also great authors of written works pertaining to geography and cartography during the Song, such as Yue Shi (his book in 983), Wang Zhu (in 1051), Li Dechu (in 1080), Chen Kunchen (in 1111), Ouyang Wen (in 1117), and Zhu Mu (in 1240). Although an early form of the local geographic gazetteer existed in China since the 1st century, the matured form known as "treatise on a place", or fangzhi, replaced the old "map guide", or tujing, under the Song. The major differences between the two were that fangzhi were products of local initiative and decision-making, were typically ten to fifty chapters in length, and were almost always printed for a large audience, whereas tujing were products of infrequent demands from the central government and were typically only four chapters long. The widespread availability of printing in the Song allowed many ordinary people to access materials that were once read almost exclusively by experts, such as printed texts and handbooks on agriculture, childbirth, pharmacy and medicine, domestic economics, geography, divination, and Taoist rituals.

== Performing arts ==
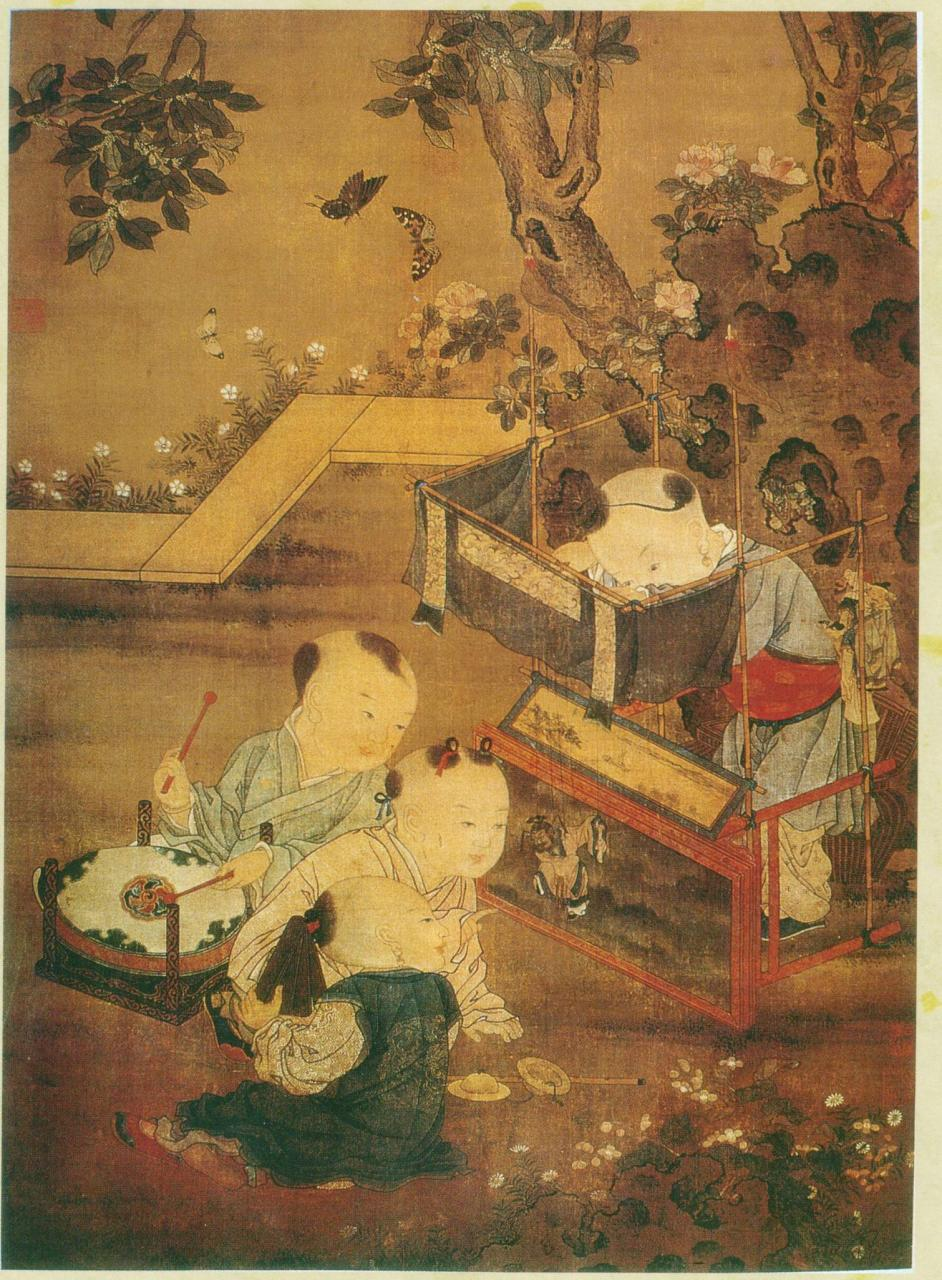
"A Children's Puppet Show" (傀儡婴戏图轴), a painting by Liu Songnian (刘松年 1174–1224 AD)

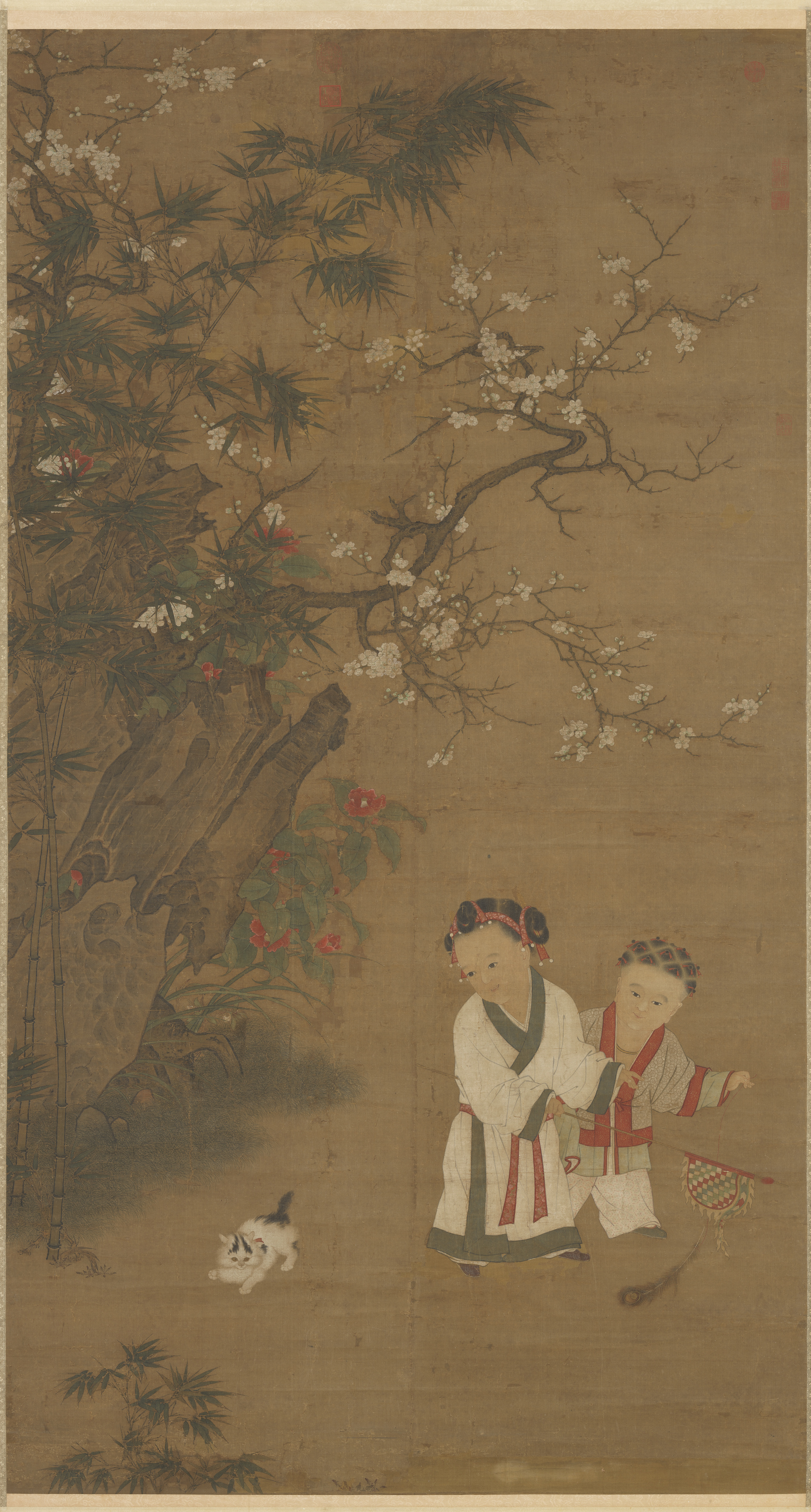
A 12th-century painting by Su Hanchen; a girl waves a peacock feather banner like the one used in dramatical theater to signal an acting leader of troops.

Theatre and drama in China trace their roots back to the academy of music known as the Pear Garden, founded in the early 8th century during the Tang dynasty. However, historian Stephen H. West asserts that the Northern Song era capital Kaifeng was the first real center where the performing arts became "an industry, a conglomerate involving theatre, gambling, prostitution, and food." The rise in consumption by merchants and scholar-officials, he states, "accelerated the growth of both the performance and the food industries," asserting a direct link between the two due to their close proximity within the cities. Of the fifty-some theatres located in the 'pleasure districts' of Kaifeng, four of these theatres were large enough to entertain audiences of several thousand each, drawing huge crowds which nearby businesses thrived upon. The chief crowd that gathered was composed of those from the merchant class, while government officials only went to restaurants and attended theatre performances during holidays.

From Kaifeng, the zaju dramatic style employed the beiqu style of poetic lyrics. After the capital had shifted to Hangzhou, the dramatic style of xiwen (also nanxi or nanqu) developed separately. These two different regional genres of musical drama used different regional dialects of speech, recitation, and dialogue, entailed their own unique sets of role types (juese), and employed different types of musical instruments playing different tunes. In Kaifeng drama, one singer was preferred for each play, accompanied by string and percussion instruments. In Hangzhou drama, there was a multitude of singers on stage for each set, while string and wind instruments were preferred.

Color and clothing distinguished the rank of theatre actors in the Song. Similar to vendors who wore specific outfits to identify which guild they belonged to, actors' generic costumes reflected the role type they played on stage, whether it be student, young man, young woman, official, soldier, etc. Actors honed their theatrical skills at drama schools. Musicians also found work in the theatre industry, since plays performed in the markets were often accompanied by music. Actors on stage always spoke their lines in Classical Chinese; vernacular Chinese that imitated the common spoken language was not introduced into theatrical performances until the Yuan dynasty. Although trained to speak in the erudite Classical language, acting troupes commonly drew their membership from one of the lowest classes in society: prostitutes. Themes enjoyed in stage skits varied from satires about corrupt officials to comedy acts with titles like "Setting fire when delivering the soup," "Raising a ruckus in the winehouse," "The peony smells best when the wine is stolen," and "Catching a monkey in a restaurant." The only xiwen play to have survived from the Southern Song era is the Zhang Xie zhuang yuan (张協狀元), featuring interludes such as a clown stealing food and wine at a wedding banquet in act 16 and a quick comedy sketch about renting a room in act 24.

Surprisingly, actors on stage did not have a wholesale monopoly on theatrical entertainment, as even vendors and peddlers in the street, singing lewd songs and beating on whatever they could find to compensate for percussion instruments, could draw crowds. This practice was so widespread that West claims "the city itself was turned into a stage and the citizens into the essential audience." Many of the songs played for stage performances were tunes that originated from vendors' and peddlers' songs. Contests were held on New Year's Day to determine which vendor or peddler had the best chants and songs while selling wares; the winners were brought before the imperial court to perform. The Wulin jiushi of the Southern Song states that these vendors, when presented to the consorts and concubines of the palace, were lavished with heaps of gold and pearls for their wares; some vendors would "become rich in a single evening." Theatrical stunts were also performed to gain attention, such as fried-glutinous-rice-ball vendors hanging small red lamps on portable bamboo racks who would twirl them around to the beat of a drum to dazzle crowds. Puppet shows in the streets and wards were also popular.

== Festivities ==
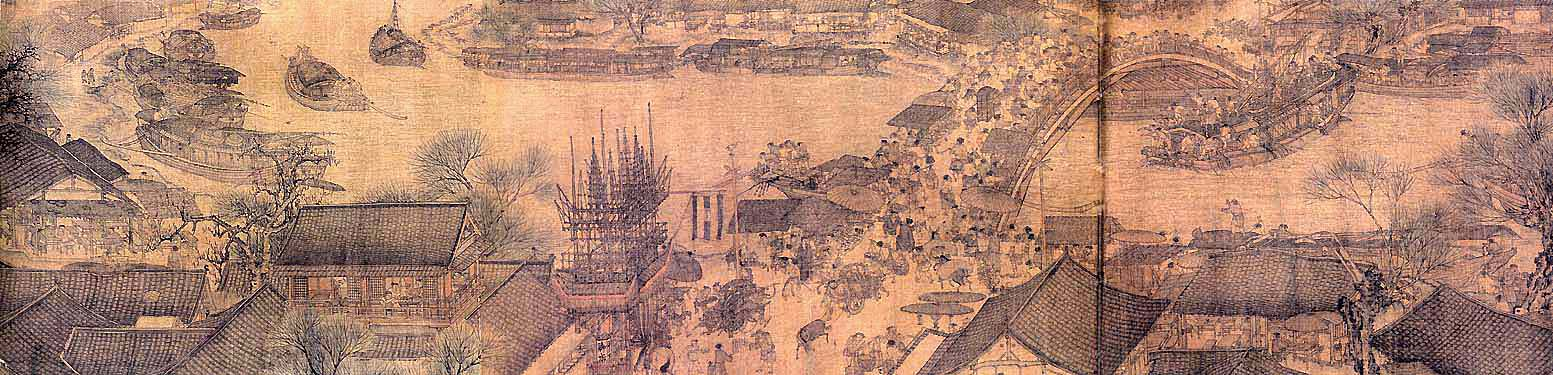
A small section of the Qingming Shang He Tu (Along the River During Qingming Festival), a large horizontal scroll painting by Zhang Zeduan (1085–1145)

In ancient China, there were many domestic and public pleasures in the rich urban environment unique to the Song dynasty. For the austere and hardworking peasantry, annual festivals and holidays provided a time of joy and relaxation, and for the poorest it meant a chance to borrow food and alcoholic drink so that everyone could join in the celebration. People would gather around their local sanctuary to observe the festival's games, theatrical entertainments, juggling, clowning, and other performances. The festivities on New Years were considered the most important of the year by the Chinese, its momentous occasion correlating with the beginning of February on the Western calendar. Preparations for the New Years festival took place over a month's time, as people busied themselves painting door gods, crafting paper streamers with lucky characters for "welcoming the spring," making printed images of Zhong Kui, and cooking special kinds of foods such as porridge of red haricot beans. The widely popular Lantern Festival was held every 15th day of 1st lunar month. According to the scholar-official Zhou Mi (AD 1232–1298), during the Xiao-Zong period (1163–1189) the best lantern festivals were held at Suzhou and Fuzhou, while Hangzhou was also known for its great variety of colorful paper lanterns, in all shapes and sizes. Meng Yuanlao (active 1126–1147) recalled in Dongjing Meng Hua Lu (Dreams of Splendor of the Eastern Capital) how the earlier Northern Song capital at Kaifeng would host festivals with tens of thousands of colorful and brightly lit paper lanterns hoisted on long poles up and down the main street, the poles also wrapped in colorful silk with numerous dramatic paper figures flying in the wind like fairies. There were also other venerated holidays, such as the Qingming Festival, as it was supposedly this period of the year that was depicted in the artwork (mentioned above) by the artist Zhang Zeduan (although some would argue the painting actually represented the time of autumn in the year).

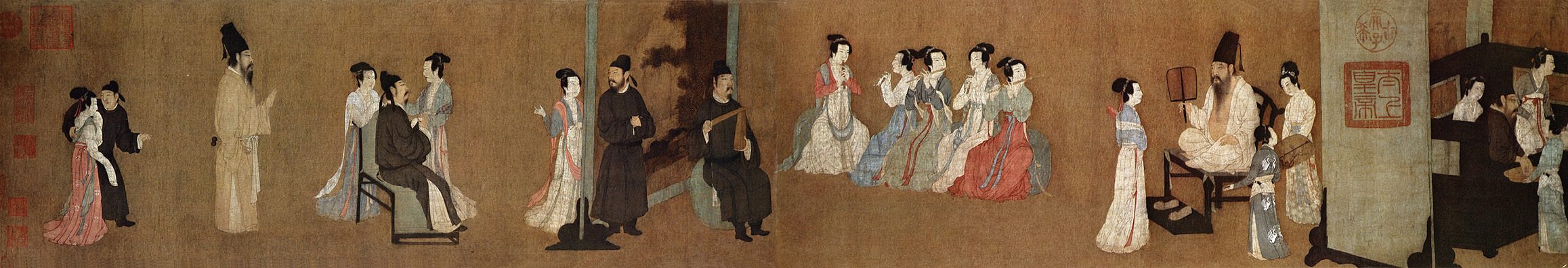
A half-section of the 12th-century Song remake of the Night Revels of Han Xizai, original by Gu Hongzhong; the female musicians in the center of the image are playing transverse bamboo flutes and guan, and the male musician is playing a wooden clapper called paiban.

With the advent of the discovery of gunpowder in China, lavish fireworks displays could also be held during festivities. For example, the martial demonstration in 1110 AD to entertain the court of Emperor Huizong, when it was recorded that a large fireworks display was held alongside Chinese dancers in strange costumes moving through clouds of colored smoke in their performance. The common people also purchased firecrackers from city shopkeepers and vendors, made of simple sticks of bamboo filled with a small amount of gunpowder.

Although they were discontinued after the devastation of the Anshi Rebellion (755–763) during the Tang dynasty, lavish Chinese carnivals were revived and once again celebrated during the Song dynasty. Chinese carnival celebrations were held nationwide when the emperor felt a great occasion warranted a grand display of his benevolence and generosity, such as renowned military victories, abundant harvests after long droughts or famines, the granting of grand amnesties by the throne, sacrifices to deities, the installation of a crown prince, marriages within the imperial family, etc.

It was during the Song dynasty that the custom of sitting on chairs instead of floormats became commonplace. However, the older practice continued to be customary for some time, with an Imperial birthday banquet in the Southern Song reportedly involving "officials sitting on sheets with purple edges on the ground". Southern Song scholar Lu You testified that the custom of low-level furniture was preserved in the palace but became phased out among the commoners, and the etiquette rules against the use of chairs was increasingly outdated.

== Clothing and apparel ==
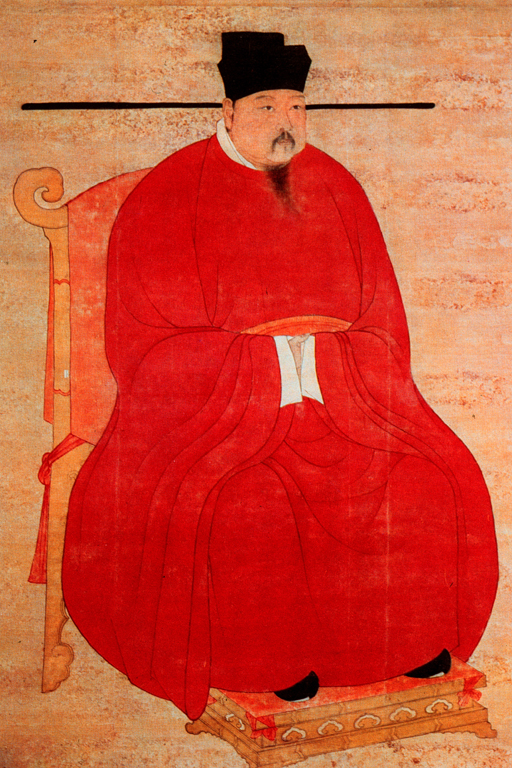
A painting of Emperor Zhenzong of Song, showing the long robes and official headgear of the emperor. This type of headgear, along with the headgear of officials and merchants, was made of black-colored silk.

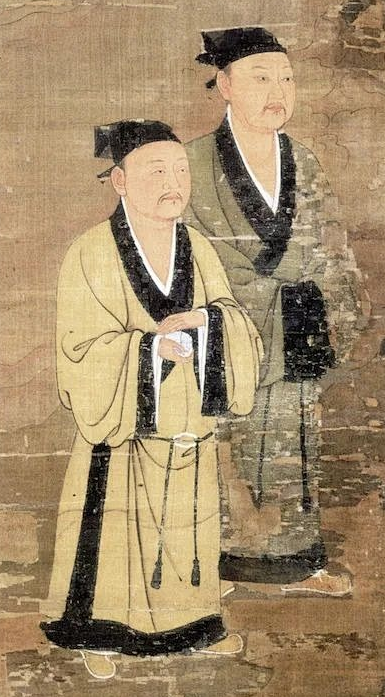
Scholars wearing zhiduo-robes and rujin (儒巾) headscarf. Various kinds of headscarves became fashionable among the commoners and the educated gentry

There were many types of clothing and different clothing trends in the Song period, yet clothes in China were always modeled after the seasons and as outward symbols of one's social class. Coal used for heating one's home was scarce and often expensive, so people often wore clothing with extra silk-floss and fur-lined coats in the winter. The clothing material preferred by the rich was silk, and for special occasions they had silk robes with gold brocade. The clothing material used by the poor was often hempen cloth, but cotton clothes were also used, the latter being most widely available in the south. The types of clothes worn by peasants and commoners were largely uniform in appearance (with color standard of black and white), and so was the case for the upper class and elite. In fact, wealthy and leading members of society followed accepted guidelines and ritual requirements for clothing. In the upper class, each stratified grade in the social hierarchy was distinguished by the color and specific ornamentation of robes, the shape and type of headgear, and even the style of girdle worn. This rigid order was especially so during the beginning of the dynasty. However, the lines of hierarchy slowly began to blur as the color purple, once reserved solely for the attire of third rank officials or higher, began to diffuse amongst all ranks of officials who bore the color indiscriminately. Along with lower grade civil officials in the government protesting the rigid regulations for attire, the wealthy members of the merchant class also contributed to the disintegration of rules for ceremonial attire worn only by certain members of society. Yet there were still visible distinctions between civil officials and the class of rich merchants and business owners; the officials were distinguished by their long robes reaching to the ground, while merchants often wore a blouse that came down below the waist with trousers. Pants and trousers were introduced to China during the Warring States in the 4th century BC, and were not exclusive to merchants; every soldier wore trousers as part of his uniform, while trousers were also worn by the common people. Although most men were cleanshaven, soldiers, military officers, and professional boxing champions preferred side-whiskers and goatee beards, as they were a sign of virility.

The attire of Song women was distinguished from men's clothing by being fastened on the left, not on the right. Women wore long dresses or blouses that came down almost to the knee. They also wore skirts and jackets with short or long sleeves. When strolling about outside and along the road, women of wealthy means chose to wear square purple scarves around their shoulders. Ladies also wore hairpins and combs in their hair, while princesses, imperial concubines, and the wives of officials and wealthy merchants wore head ornaments of gold and silver that were shaped in the form of phoenixes and flowers.

People in the Song dynasty never left their homes barefoot, and always had some sort of headgear on. Shops in the city specialized in certain types of hats and headgear, including caps with pointed tails, as well as belts and waistwraps. Only Buddhist monks shaved their heads and strolled about with no headgear or hat of any sort to cover their heads. For footwear, people could purchase leather shoes called 'oiled footwear', wooden sandals, hempen sandals, and the more expensive satin slippers.

== Food and cuisine ==
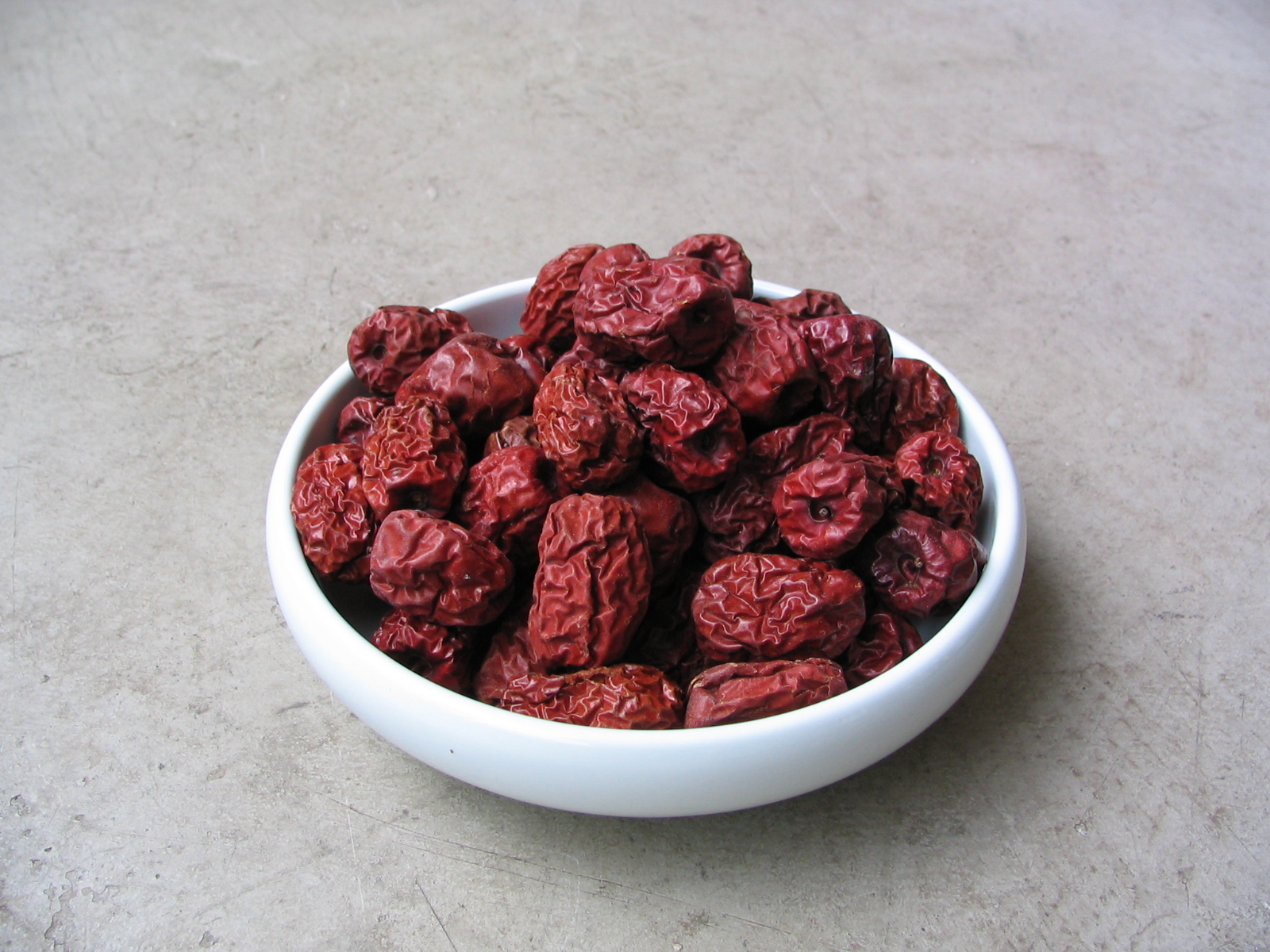
Dried jujubes such as these were imported to Song China from South Asia and the Middle East. An official from Canton was invited to the home of an Arab merchant, and described the jujube as thus: "This fruit is the color of sugar, its skin and its pulp are sweet, and it gives the impression, when you eat it, of having first been cooked in the oven and then allowed to dry."

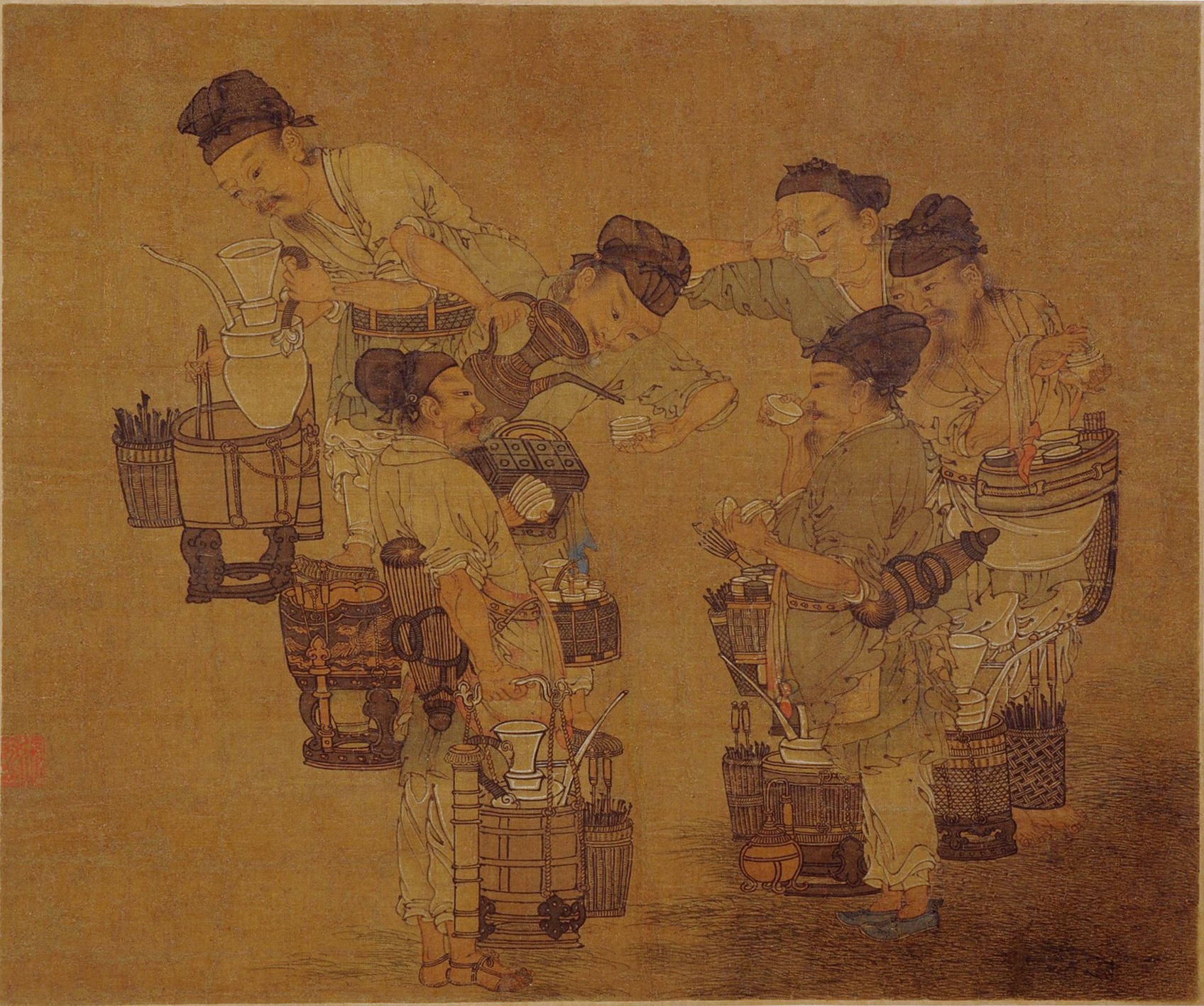
Song dynasty painting showing commoners engaged in tea competition.

From the Song period, works such as Dongjing Meng Hua Lu (Dreams of Splendor of the Eastern Capital) preserve lists of names for entrées and food dishes in customer menus for restaurants and taverns, as well as for feasts at banquets, festivals and carnivals, and modest dining. Many of the peculiar names for these dishes do not provide clues as to what types of food ingredients were used. However, judging from the listed seasonings they used for these dishes, such as pepper, ginger, soya sauce, oil, salt, and vinegar, Song era cuisine is perhaps not too different from the Chinese cuisine of today. Other additional seasonings and ingredients included walnuts, turnips, crushed Chinese cardamon kernels, fagara, olives, ginkgo nuts, citrus zest, and sesame oil.

Regional differences in culture brought about different types of foods, while in certain areas the cooking traditions of regional cultures blended together; such was the case of the Southern Song capital at Hangzhou. After the mass exodus from the north, people brought Henan-style cooking and foods (popular in the previous Northern Song capital at Kaifeng) to Hangzhou, which was blended with the cooking traditions of Zhejiang. However, records indicate that already in the Northern Song period, the first capital at Kaifeng sported restaurants that served southern Chinese cuisine. This catered to capital officials whose native provinces were in the southeast, and would have found northern cuisine lacking in sufficient seasoning for their tastes. In fact, texts from the Song era provide the first use of the phrases nanshi, beishi, and chuanfan to refer specifically to northern, southern, and Sichuan cooking, respectively. Many restaurants were known for their specialties; for example, there was one restaurant in Hangzhou that served only iced foods, while some restaurants catered to those who wanted either hot, warm, room temperature, or cold foods. Descendants of those from Kaifeng owned most of the restaurants found in Hangzhou, but many other regional varieties in foodstuffs and cooking were sponsored by restaurants. This included restaurants catering Sichuan cuisine that emphasized use of pepper, dishes and beverages from Hebei and Shandong, and coastal foods of shrimp and saltwater fish. The memory and patience of waiters had to be keen; in the larger restaurants, serving dinner parties that required twenty or so dishes became a hassle if even a slight error occurred. If a guest reported the mistake of a waiter to the head of the restaurant, the waiter could be verbally reprimanded, have his salary docked, or in extreme cases, kicked out of the establishment for good.

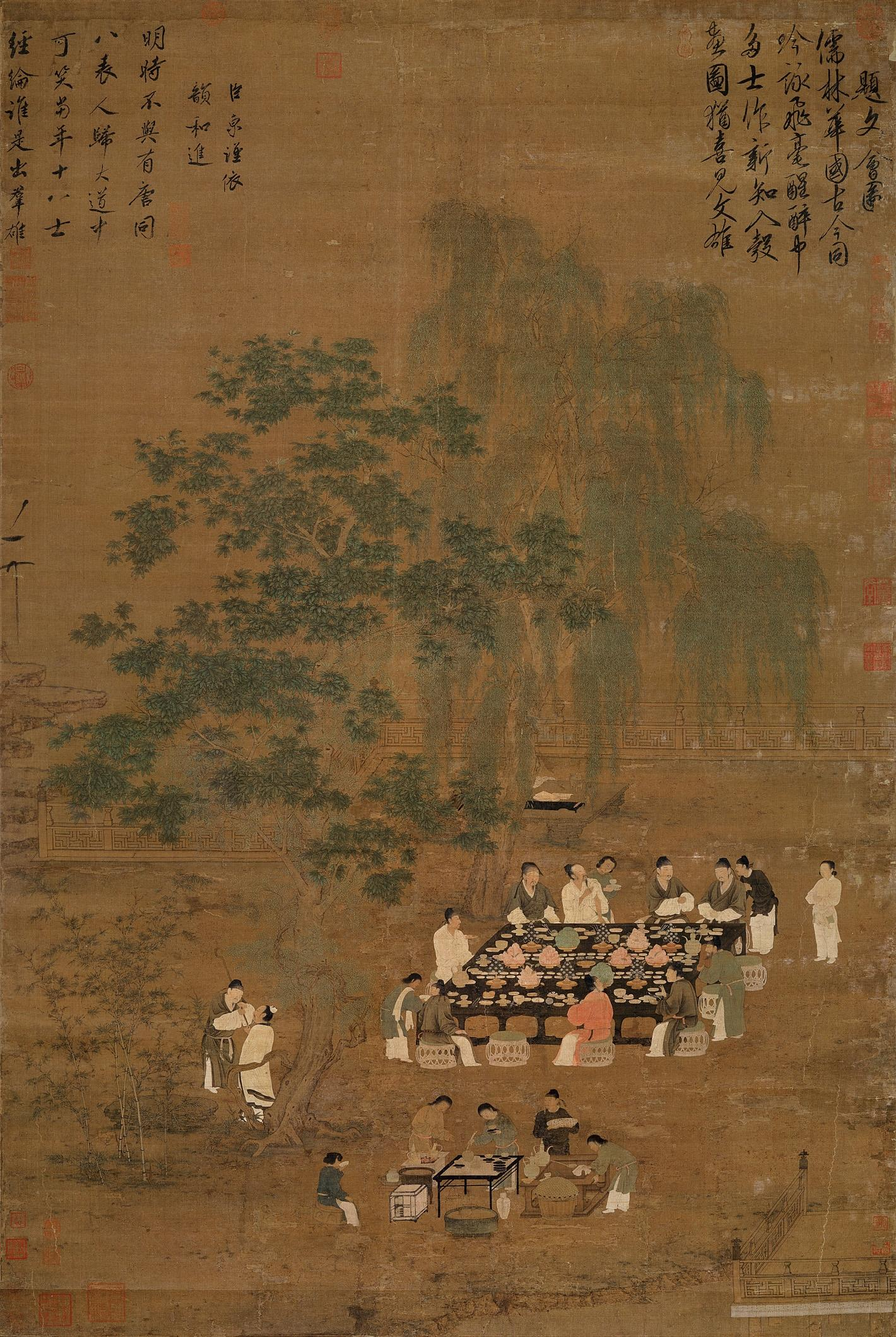
A Chinese painting of an outdoor banquet, a Song dynasty painting and possible remake of a Tang dynasty original.

In the early morning in Hangzhou, along the wide avenue of the Imperial Way, special breakfast items and delicacies were sold. This included fried tripe, pieces of mutton or goose, soups of various kinds, hot pancakes, steamed pancakes, and iced cakes. Noodle shops were also popular, and remained open all day and night along the Imperial Way. According to one Song source on Kaifeng, the night markets closed at the third night watch but reopened on the fifth, while they had also gained a reputation for staying open during winter storms and the darkest, rainiest days of winter.

There were also some exotic foreign foods imported to China from abroad, including raisins, dates, Persian jujubes, and grape wine; rice wine was more common in China, a fact noted even by the 13th century Venetian traveler Marco Polo. Although grape-based wine had been known in China since the ancient Han dynasty Chinese ventured into Hellenistic Central Asia, grape-wine was often reserved for the elite. Besides wine, other beverages included pear juice, lychee fruit juice, honey and ginger drinks, tea, and pawpaw juice. Dairy products and farming were foreign concepts to the Chinese, which explains the absence of cheese and milk in their diet. Beef was also rarely eaten, since the bull was an important draft animal. The main diet of the lower classes remained rice, pork, and salted fish, while it is known from restaurant dinner menus that the upper classes did not eat dog meat. The rich are known to have consumed an array of different meats, such as chicken, shellfish, fallow deer, hares, partridge, pheasant, francolin, quail, fox, badger, clam, crab, and many others. Local freshwater fish from the nearby lake and river were also caught and brought to market, while the West Lake provided geese and duck as well. Common fruits that were consumed included melons, pomegranates, lychees, longans, golden oranges, jujubes, Chinese and Japanese quinces, apricots and pears; in the region around Hangzhou alone, there were eleven kinds of apricots and eight different kinds of pears that were produced. Specialties and combination dishes in the Song period included scented shellfish cooked in rice-wine, geese with apricots, lotus-seed soup, spicy soup with mussels and fish cooked with plums, sweet soya soup, baked sesame buns stuffed with either sour bean filling or pork tenderloin, mixed vegetable buns, fragrant candied fruit, strips of ginger and fermented beanpaste, jujube-stuffed steamed dumplings, fried chestnuts, salted fermented bean soup, fruit cooked in scented honey, and 'honey crisps' of kneaded and baked honey, flour, mutton fat and pork lard. Dessert molds of oiled flour and sugared honey were shaped into girls' faces or statuettes of soldiers with full armor like door guards, and were called "likeness foods" (guoshi).

== Philosophy ==
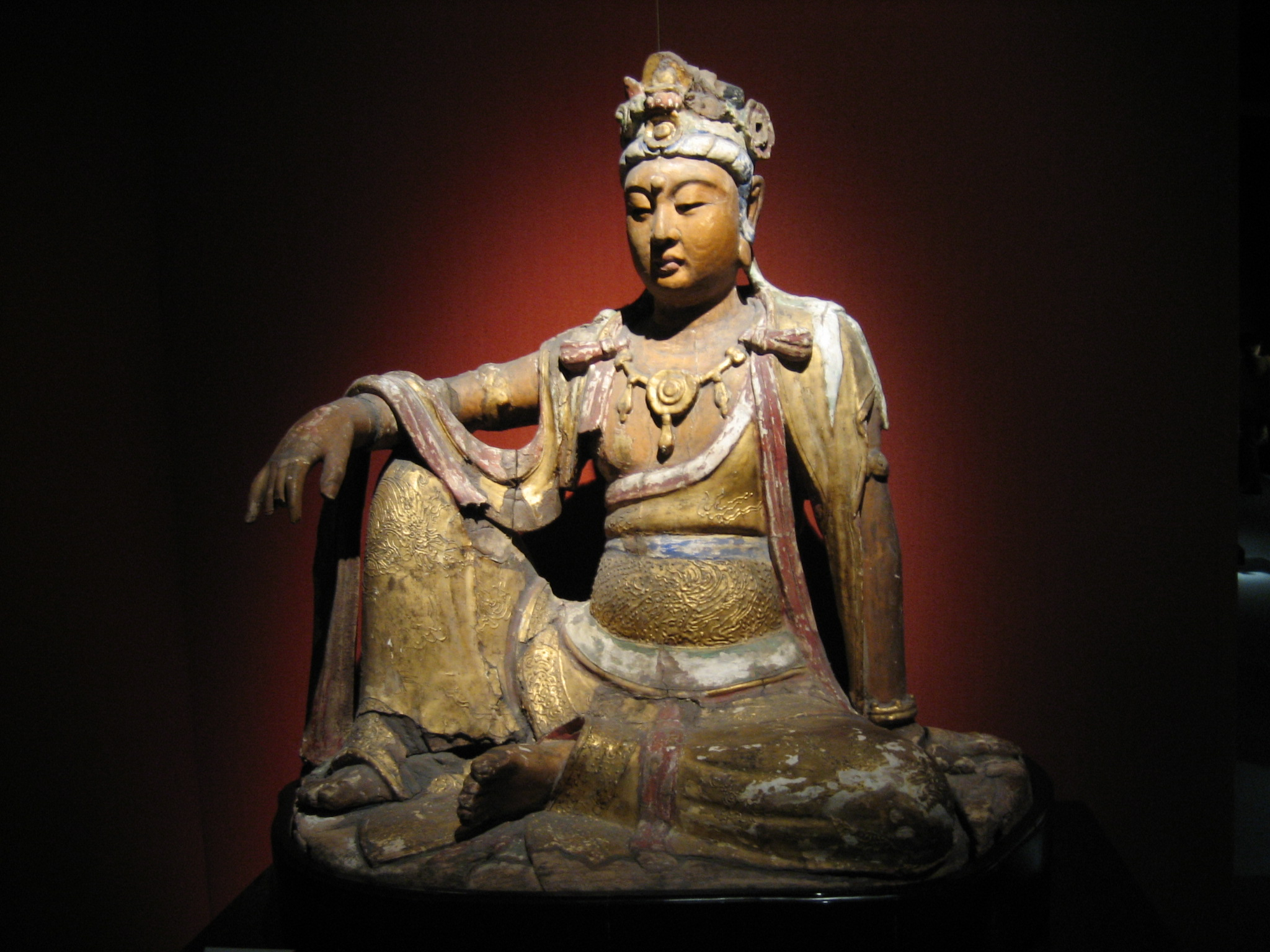
A wooden Bodhisattva statue from the Song dynasty

Song intellectuals sought answers to all philosophical and political questions in the Confucian Classics. This renewed interest in the Confucian ideals and society of ancient times coincided with the decline of Buddhism, which was then largely regarded as foreign, and as offering few solutions for practical problems. However, Buddhism in this period continued as a cultural underlay to the more accepted Confucianism and even Taoism, both seen as native and pure by conservative Neo-Confucians. The continuing popularity of Buddhism can be seen with strong evidence by achievements in the arts, such as the 100 painting set of the Five Hundred Luohan, completed by Lin Tinggui and Zhou Jichang in 1178.

The conservative Confucian movement could be seen before the likes of Zhu Xi (1130–1200), with staunch anti-Buddhists such as Ouyang Xiu (1007–1072). In his written work of the Ben-lun, he wrote of his theory for how Buddhism had so easily penetrated Chinese culture during the earlier Southern and Northern Dynasties period. He argued that Buddhism became widely accepted when China's traditional institutions were weakened at the time. This was due to many factors, such as foreign Xianbei ruling over the north, and China's political schism that caused warfare and other ills. Although Emperor Wen of Sui (r. 581–604) abolished the Nine Ranks in favor of a Confucian-taught bureaucracy drafted through civil service examinations, he also heavily sponsored the popular ideology of Buddhism to legitimate his rule. Hence, it was given free rein and influence to flourish and dominate Chinese culture during the Sui and Tang periods; historian Arthur F. Wright describes Confucianism in this period as being reverted to a state of "stale archaism". Ouyang Xiu wrote:

"This curse [Buddhism] has overspread the empire for a thousand years, and what can one man in one day do about it? The people are drunk with it, and it has entered the marrow of their bones; it is surely not to be overcome by eloquent talk. What, then, is to be done?

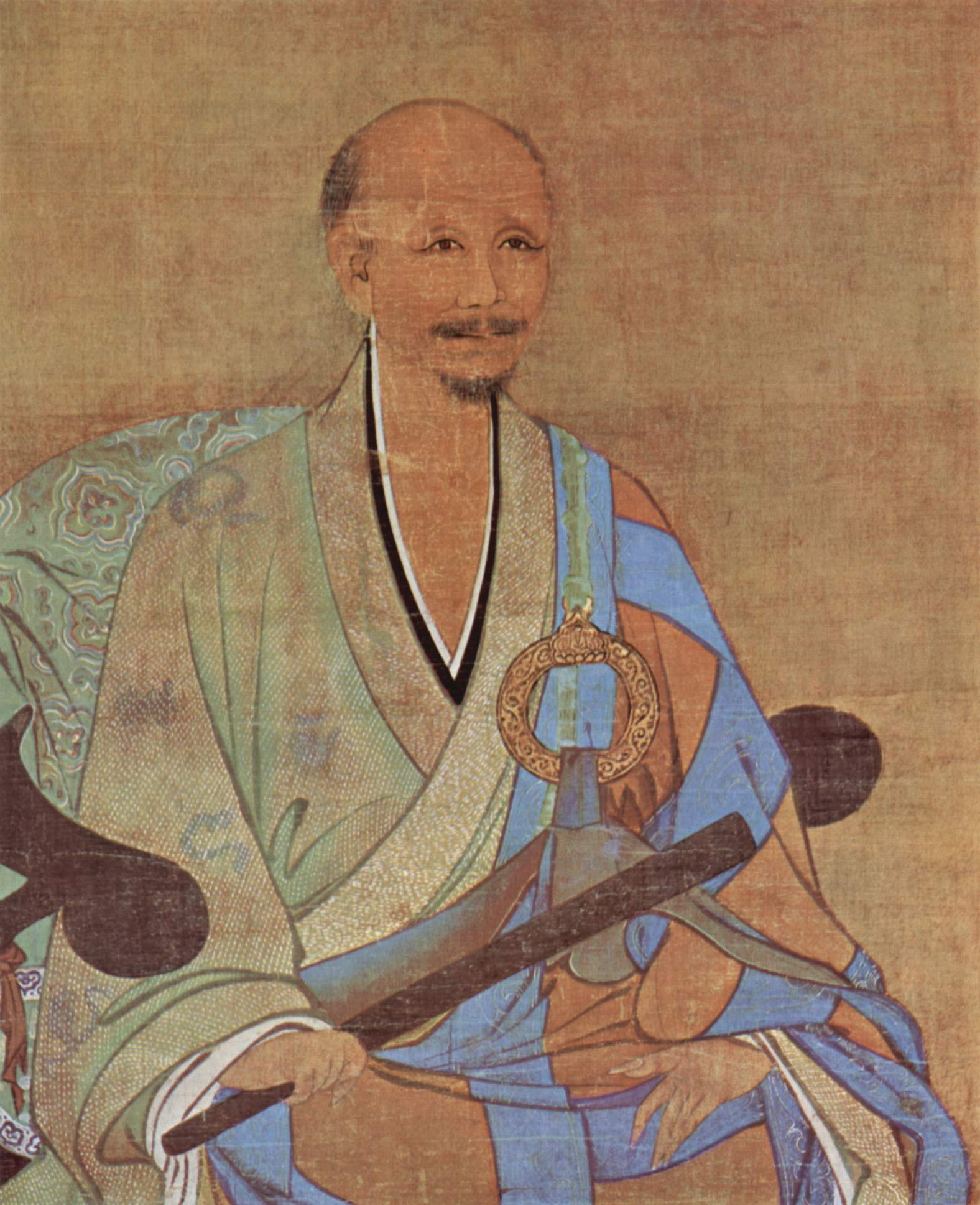
Portrait of the Chinese Zen Buddhist Wuzhun Shifan, painted in 1238 AD.

In conclusion on how to root out the 'evil' that was Buddhism, Ouyang Xiu presented a historical example of how it could be uprooted from Chinese culture:

Of old, in the time of the Warring States, Yang Zhu and Mo Di were engaged in violent controversy. Mencius deplored this and devoted himself to teaching benevolence and righteousness. His exposition of benevolence and righteousness won the day, and the teachings of Mo Di and Yang Zhu were extirpated. In Han times the myriad schools of thought all flourished together. Tung Chung-shu deplored this and revived Confucianism. Therefore the Way of Confucius shone forth, and the myriad schools expired. This is the effect of what I have called "correcting the root cause in order to overcome the evil".

Although Confucianism was cast in stark contrast to the perceived alien and morally inept Buddhism by those such as Ouyang Xiu, Confucianism nonetheless borrowed ideals of Buddhism to provide for its own revival. From Mahayana Buddhism, the Bodhisattva ideal of ethical universalism with benevolent charity and relief to those in need inspired those such as Fan Zhongyan and Wang Anshi, along with the Song government. In contrast to the earlier heavily Buddhist Tang period, where wealthy and pious Buddhist families and Buddhist temples handled much of the charity and alms to the poor, the Song government took on this ideal role instead, through its various programs of welfare and charity (refer to Society section). In addition, the historian Arthur F. Wright notes this situation during the Song period, with philosophical nativism taking from Buddhism its earlier benevolent role:

It is true that Buddhist monks were given official appointments as managers of many of these enterprises, but the initiative came from Neo-Confucian officials. In a sense the Buddhist idea of compassion and many of the measures developed for its practical expression had been appropriated by the Chinese state.

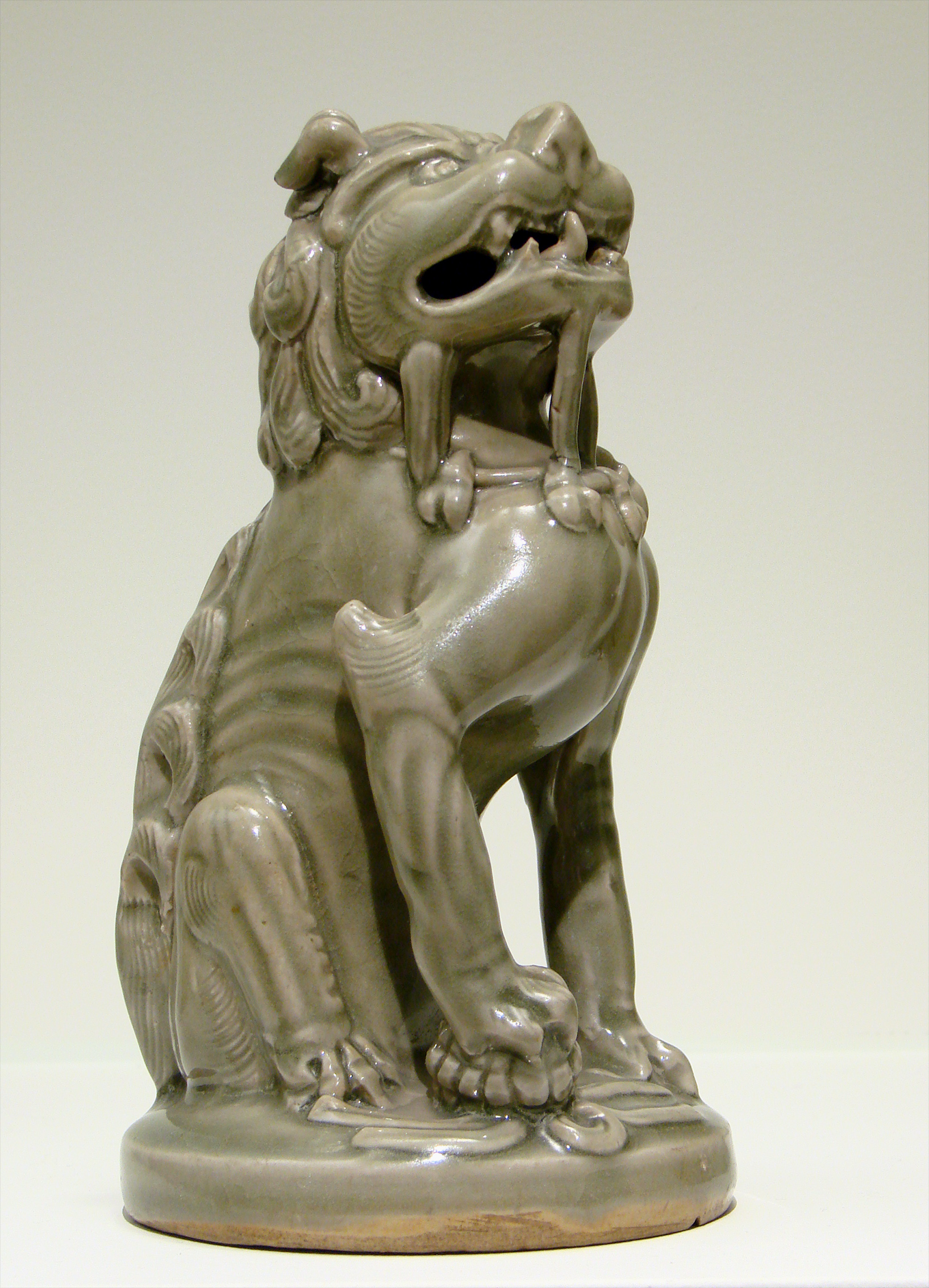
A seated lion statue, celadon, from Yaozhou, Shaanxi, 11th to 12th century

Although Buddhism lost its prominence in the elite circles and government sponsorships of Chinese society, this did not mean the disappearance of Buddhism from Chinese culture. Zen Buddhism continued to flourish during the Song period, as Emperor Lizong of Song had the monk Wuzhun Shifan share the Chán (Zen) doctrine with the imperial court. Much like the Eastern Roman Emperor Julian the Apostate promoting Roman paganism and Theurgy amongst the leading members of Roman society while pushing Christianity's influence into the lower classes, so too did Neo-Confucians of the 13th century succeed in driving Buddhism out of the higher echelons of Chinese society.

In terms of Buddhist metaphysics, Zhou Dunyi influenced the beliefs and teachings of Northern Song-era Confucian scholars such as Cheng Hao and Cheng Yi (who were brothers), and was a major influence for Zhu Xi, one of the leading architects of Neo-Confucianism. They emphasized moral self-cultivation over service to the ruler of the state (healing society's ills from the bottom-up, not the top-down), as opposed to statesmen like Fan Zhongyan or Su Shi, who pursued their agenda to advise the ruler to make the best decisions for the common good of all. The Cheng brothers also taught that the workings of nature and metaphysics could be taught through the principle (li) and the vital energy (qi). The principle of nature could be moral or physical, such as the principle of marriage being moral, while the principle of trees is physical. Yet for principles to exist and function normally, there would have to be substance as well as vital energy. This allowed Song intellectuals to validate the teachings of Mencius on the innate goodness of human nature, while at the same time providing an explanation for human wrongdoing. In essence, the principle underlying a human being is good and benevolent, but vital energy has the potential to go astray and be corrupted, giving rise to selfish impulses and all other negative human traits.

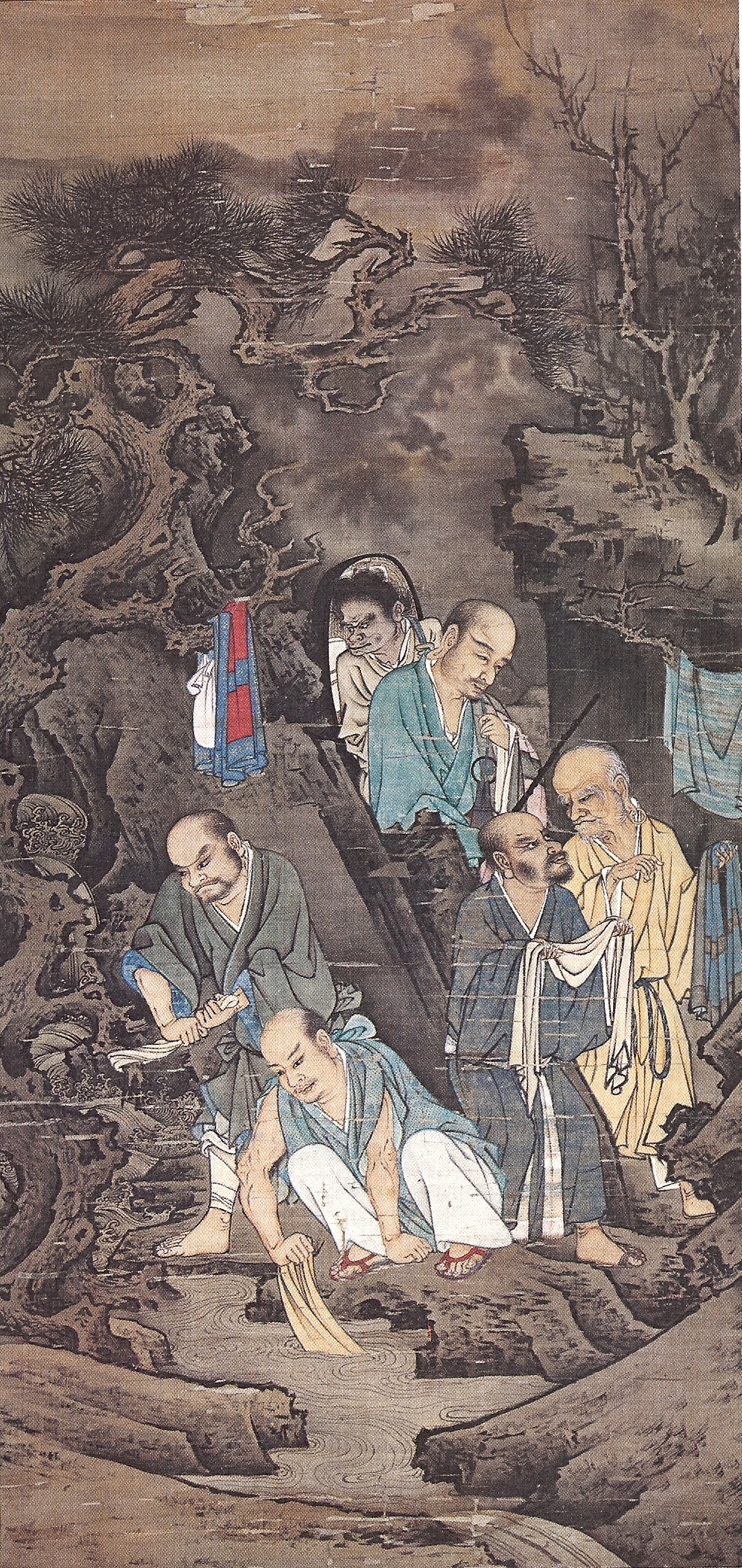
Luohan Laundering, Buddhist artwork of five luohan and one attendant, by Lin Tinggui, 1178 AD

The Song Neo-Confucian philosophers, finding a certain purity in the originality of the ancient classical texts, wrote commentaries on them. The most influential of these philosophers was Zhu Xi, whose synthesis of Confucian thought and Buddhist, Taoist, and other ideas became the official imperial ideology from late Song times to the late 19th century. The basis of his teaching was influenced by the Cheng brothers, but he greatly extended their teachings, forming the core of Neo-Confucianism. This included emphasis on the Four Books: the Analects, Mencius, Doctrine of the Mean, and the Great Learning (the latter two being chapters in the ancient Book of Rites). His viewpoint was that improvement of the world began with improvement of the mind, as outlined in the Great Learning. His approach to Confucianism was shunned by his contemporaries, as his writings were forbidden to be cited by students taking the Imperial Examinations. However, Emperor Lizong of Song found his writing to be intriguing, reversing the policy against him, and making it a requirement for students to study his commentaries on the Four Books.

== See also ==
- Architecture of the Song dynasty
- Culture of China
- Economy of the Song dynasty
- History of the Song dynasty
- Military history of the Song dynasty
- Science and technology of the Song dynasty
- Shao Yong
- Society and culture of the Han dynasty
- Society of the Song dynasty
- Song poetry
- The Qing Ding Pearl
