= John Mills (encyclopaedist) =

English writer and translator (c.1717–c.1794)

John Mills (c. 1717 – c. 1794) was an English writer on agriculture, translator and editor. Mills and Gottfried Sellius are known for being the first to prepare a French edition of Ephraim Chambers's Cyclopaedia for publication in 1745, which eventually resulted in the Encyclopédie published in France between 1751 and 1772.

As writer on agriculture, Mills is credited for publishing the earliest complete treatise on all branches of agriculture. His chief work, A New System of Practical Husbandry, in 5 volumes, appeared in 1767. It combines the results of the experience and observations of such writers as Evelyn, Duhamel, John Worlidge, and Jethro Tull, and was highly commended. Mills was a warm advocate of small farms.

== Biography ==
Mills was a person of considerable eminence in the 18th century, though little definite is known because no record exists of his life. From his manner of expression, it is possible he may have lived his early life in foreign countries a long time, possibly in France, but he was not born there. In 1741 he was staying in London, where he had made preparations to go to Jamaica. He cancelled those plans because, as he wrote "having met with something more advantageous which engages me to stay in England" Mills married a French woman, and they had two children; one baptised in Paris on 27 April 1742 and another born in May 1743.

In 1743 Mills was in Paris for the purpose of bringing out, in concert with Gottfried Sellius, a German historian, a French edition of Ephraim Chambers's Cyclopaedia; but André le Breton, the printer commissioned by him to manage the undertaking, cheated him out of the subscription money, assaulted him, and ultimately obtained a license in his own name. This was the origin of the famous Encyclopédie. Mills, unable to obtain redress, returned to England.

In 1755 Mills had started translation The History of the Roman Emperors, from Augustus to Constantine by Jean-Baptiste Louis Crévier from the French, and in 1763 Mills continued and completed the Memoirs of the Court of Augustus, by Thomas Blackwell the younger. In the 1760s he found his true vocation as a writer on agriculture, which started with his translation in 1762 of Duhamel du Monceau's Practical Treatise of Husbandry. In 1766 he published an Essay on the Management of Bees. The A New System of Practical Husbandry, (1767) treated all branches of agriculture, and contains the first mention of the potato as grown in fields. In 1770 appeared a translation from the Latin of G.A. Gyllenberg's Natural and Chemical Elements of Agriculture; in 1772 an Essay on the Weather (translated into Dutch in 1772), and Essays, Moral, Philosophical, and Political (anonymous, but advertised under his name); and in 1776 a Treatise on Cattle.

On 13 February 1766 Mills was elected a Fellow of the Royal Society with Benjamin Franklin as one of his sponsors. He was the first foreign associate of the French Agricultural Society, on whose list his name, with London as his residence, appears from 1767 to 1784. He was also member of the Royal Societies of Agriculture of Rouen, the Mannheim Academy of Sciences, and the Economical Society of Bern.

== Work ==
Mills was credited for his comprehensive knowledge of agriculture, and of the cultivation and use of the ground. He authored and translated several works in these fields. He became a well known author on the subject of husbandry in the 1760s, and was elected member of the Royal Society in 1766. He had come to prominence about twenty years earlier, while working on the translation of Chambers's Cyclopaedia.

=== Encyclopédie ===
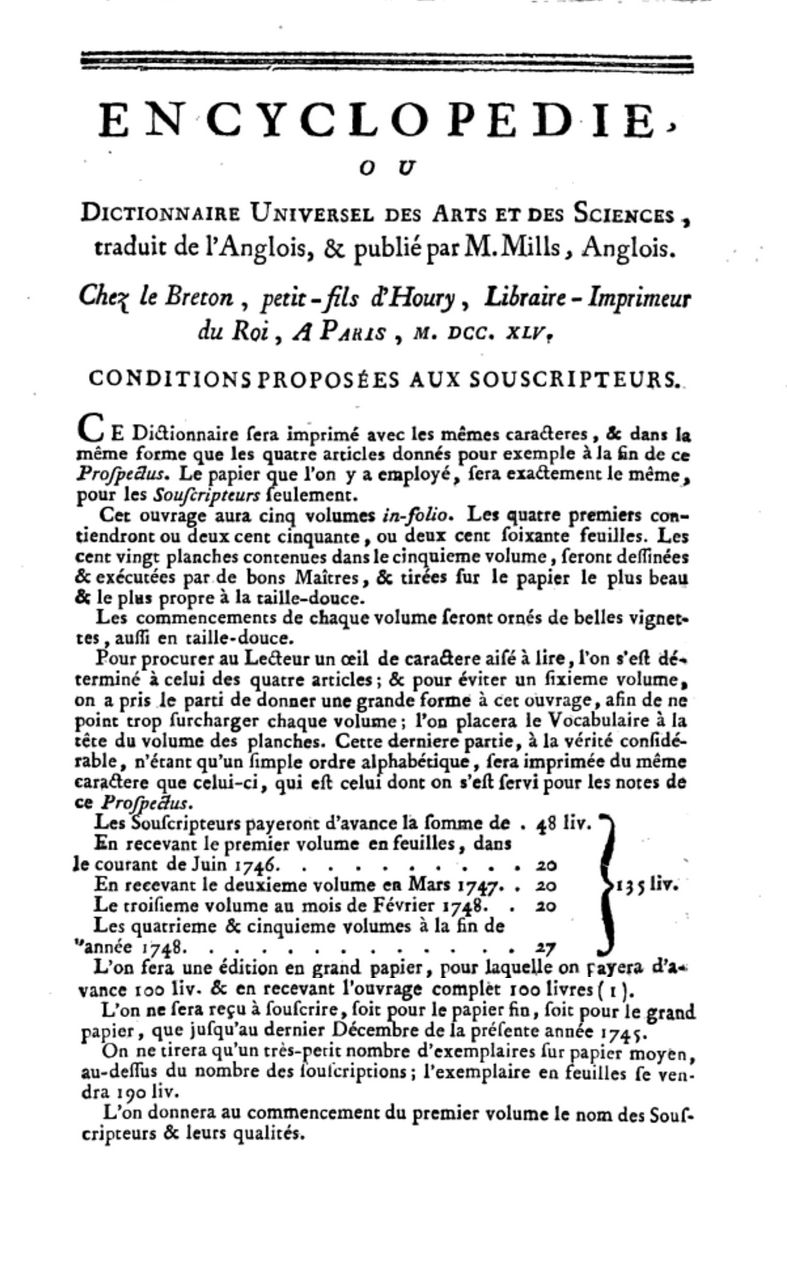
Encyclopédie, Conditions for Subscriber, 1745/71.

Ephraim Chambers had first published his Cyclopaedia, or an Universal Dictionary of Arts and Sciences in two volumes in London in 1728, following several dictionaries of arts and sciences that had emerged in Europe since the late 17th century. This work became quite renowned, and four editions were published between 1738 and 1742. An Italian translation of this work appeared from 1747 to 1754. In France a member of the banking family Lambert began translating Chambers into French, but in 1745 John Mills and Gottfried Sellius were the first to actually prepare a French edition of Ephraim Chambers's Cyclopaedia for publication, which they entitled Encyclopédie.

Early in 1745 Mills and Sellius published a prospectus for the Encyclopédie to attract subscribers to the project. This four-page prospectus was illustrated by Jean-Michel Papillon, and accompanied by a plan (see image), stating that the work would be published in five volumes from June 1746 until the end of 1748. The text was translated by Mills and Sellius, and it was corrected by an unnamed person, who appears to have been Denis Diderot.

The prospectus was reviewed quite positively and cited at some length in several journals. The Mémoires pour l'histoire des sciences et des beaux arts journal praised the project as "voici deux des plus fortes entreprises de Littérature qu'on ait faites depuis long-tems" (here are two of the greatest efforts undertaken in literature in a long time). The Mercure Journal in June 1745 wrote a 25-pages article specifically praising Mill's role as translator; the Journal introduced Mills as an English scholar who had been raised in France and who spoke both French and English as a native. The Journal reports that Mills had discussed the work with several academics, was zealous about the project, had devoted his fortune to support this enterprise, and was the sole owner of the publishing privilege.

However, the co-operation fell apart later in 1745. André le Breton, the publisher commissioned to manage the undertaking, cheated Mills out of the subscription money, claiming, for example, that Mills' knowledge of French was inadequate. In a confrontation, le Breton physically assaulted Mills. Mills took le Breton to court, but the court decided in le Breton's favour. Le Breton replaced Mills with Jean Paul de Gua de Malves, who in turn was later replaced by Denis Diderot. Soon after the court ruling, Mills left for England.

=== The History of the Roman Emperors, from Augustus to Constantine, 1755 ===
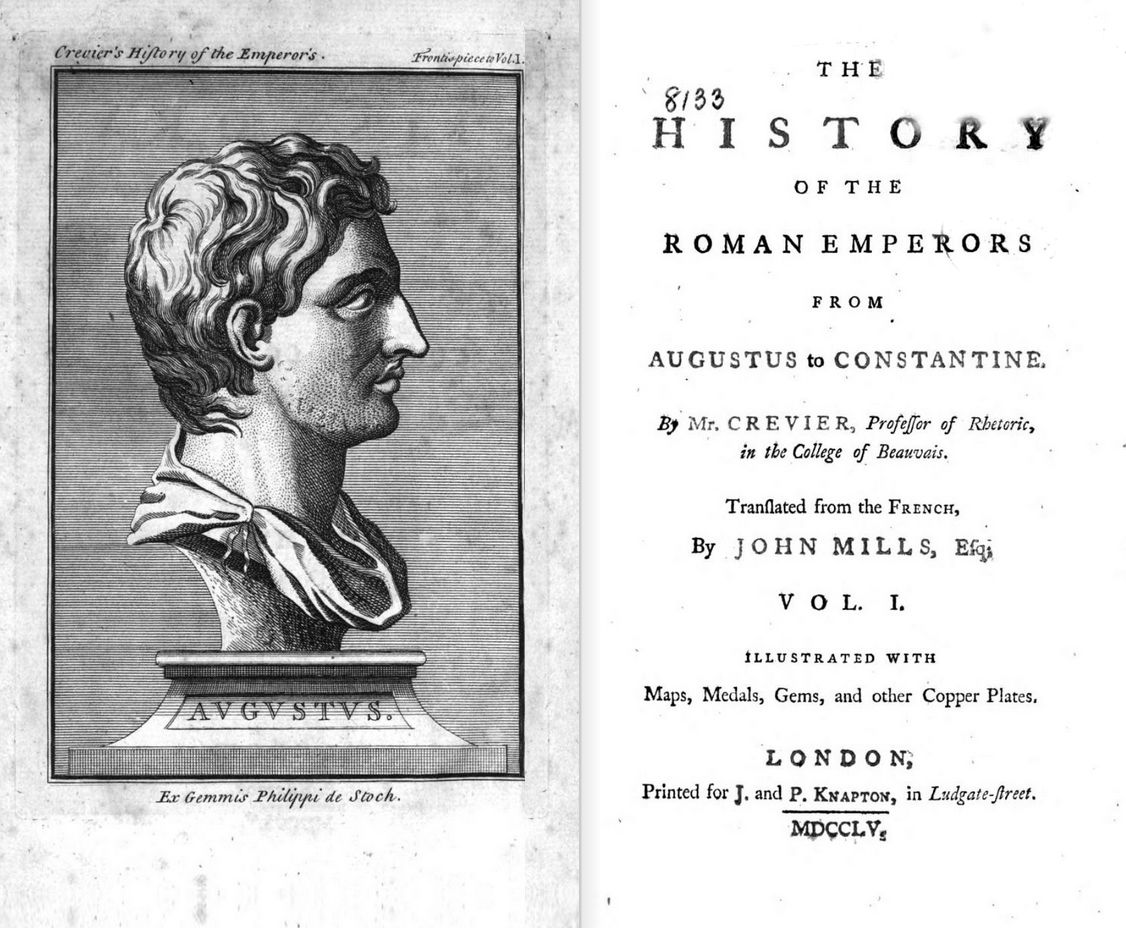
The History of the Roman Emperors from Augustus to Constantine, 1755

Mills re-emerged from the shadow in 1755 as the translator of The History of the Roman Emperors, from Augustus to Constantine. This work was originally written in 10 volumes by Jean-Baptiste Louis Crévier, who was Professor of Rhetoric in the Collège de Beauvais in Paris. Mills had translated from the French the first two volumes, when in 1755 a review of this work was published in The monthly review of literary journal. The review introduced Mills as the translator, with the following phrase:

Mr. Mills, and his other works, we are alike strangers to; but have been informed he has published some tracts, with reputation, abroad; and that he was the first undertaker and promoter of the translation of Chambers's Cyclopædia into French...

In Robert Watt's Bibliotheca Britannica (1824, p. 670) this translation was credited to another John Mills Esq., but this description clearly indicates we are dealing with one and the same person. The 1755 review was critical about Mill's translation skills, and stated:

...If he is an Englishman, which, but for his name, we should doubt, from his manner of expression, it is possible he may have lived so long in foreign countries, as to have somewhat lessened his acquaintance with his vernacular language: for we have met with few writers that have shewn themselves less masters of its purity, Mr. Johnson has judiciously observed, that "the great pest of speech is frequency of translation. No book was ever turned from one language to another, without imparting something of its native idiom; this is the most mischievous and comprehensive innovation; single words may enter by thousands, and 'the fabric of the tongue continue the fame; but new phraseology changes much at once, it alters not the single stones of the building, but the order of the columns."

The review specifically expressed, that Mills left his diction in a Gallic form, that renders it uncouth to an English ear. They hoped, that the remaining volumes would be more agreeable to the reader. It is unknown if Mills fulfilled this expectation, but he did translate another eight volumes, which were published in the next years.

=== A practical Treatise of Husbandry, 1759 ===
Mills first serious work in the field of agriculture, was the translation of Duhamel du Monceau's Practical Treatise of Husbandry, from the French. The full title of this translation is:

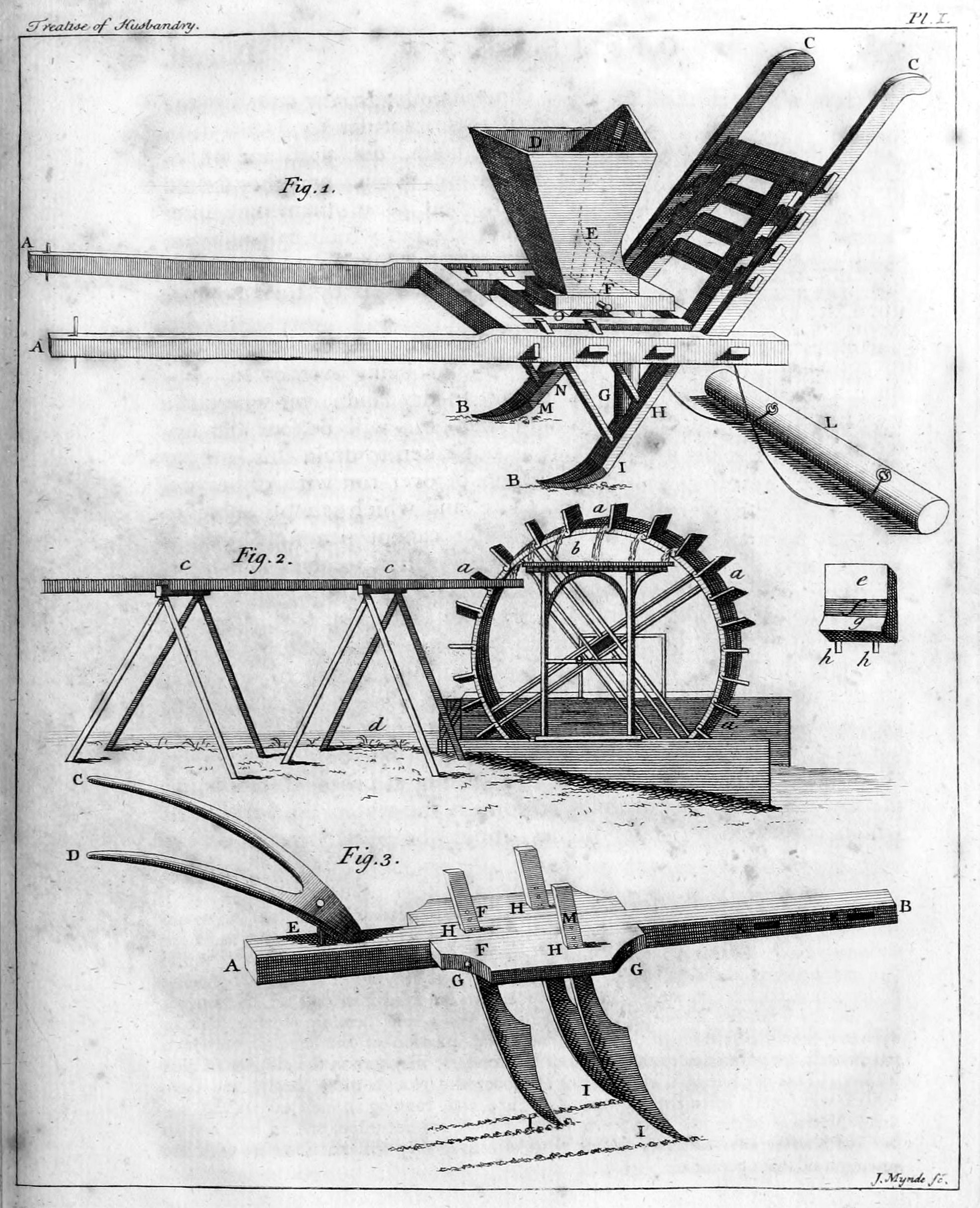
Treatise of Husbandry, 1759, Plate I

A practical Treatise of Husbandry: Wherein are contained many useful and valuable Experiments and Observations in the New Husbandry, collected during a Series of Years, by the celebrated, M. Duhamel Du Monceau, Member of the Royal Academy of Sciences dt Paris, Fellow of the Royal Society, London, &c. Also the most approved Practice of the best English Farmers, in the old Method of Husbandry. With Copper-Plates of several new and useful Instruments., 4tO. 16s. Whiston, &c.

Duhamel's work originally consisted of five volumes, which were published at different times. Mills didn't translation this work as a whole. He translated only such experiments as seemed to him most instructive in the then modern practice of farming, either according to the old or new method. Mills explained in the preface, that "Duhamel and his correspondents have set the world an example which has long been wanted, and greatly desired by all who have the good of their country at heart, and are in the least sensible of the importance of Agriculture. They have given us a series of experiments in this most useful art, continued for several years together, with accuracy and judgment, and related in a clear, distinct, manner."

According to Mills the work of Duhamel is noted for it empirical origin. Theory alone can avail but little in agriculture, Mills declared, referring to the following observation by Francis Home:

Agriculture does not take its rise originally from reason, but from fact and experience. It is a branch of natural philosophy, and can only be improved from a knowledge of facts, as they happen in nature. It is by attending to these facts that the other branches of natural philosophy have been so much advanced during these two last ages. Medicine has attained its present per section, only from the history of diseases and cafes delivered down. Chemistry is now reduced to a regular system, by the means of experiments made either by chance or design. But where are the experiments in Agriculture to answer this purpose ? When I look round for such, I can find few or none. There then lies the impediment in the way of Agriculture. Books in that art, we are not deficient in: but the book which we want, is a book of experiments.

Only after reading the three first volumes of Experiments published by M. Duhamel, Francis Home declared: "They are distinct, exact, conclusive so far as they have gone, and stand a model for experiments in Agriculture. What a shame for Great Britain, where Agriculture is so much cultivated, to leave its exact value to be determined by foreigners!"

Illustrations of A practical Treatise of Husbandry, 1759
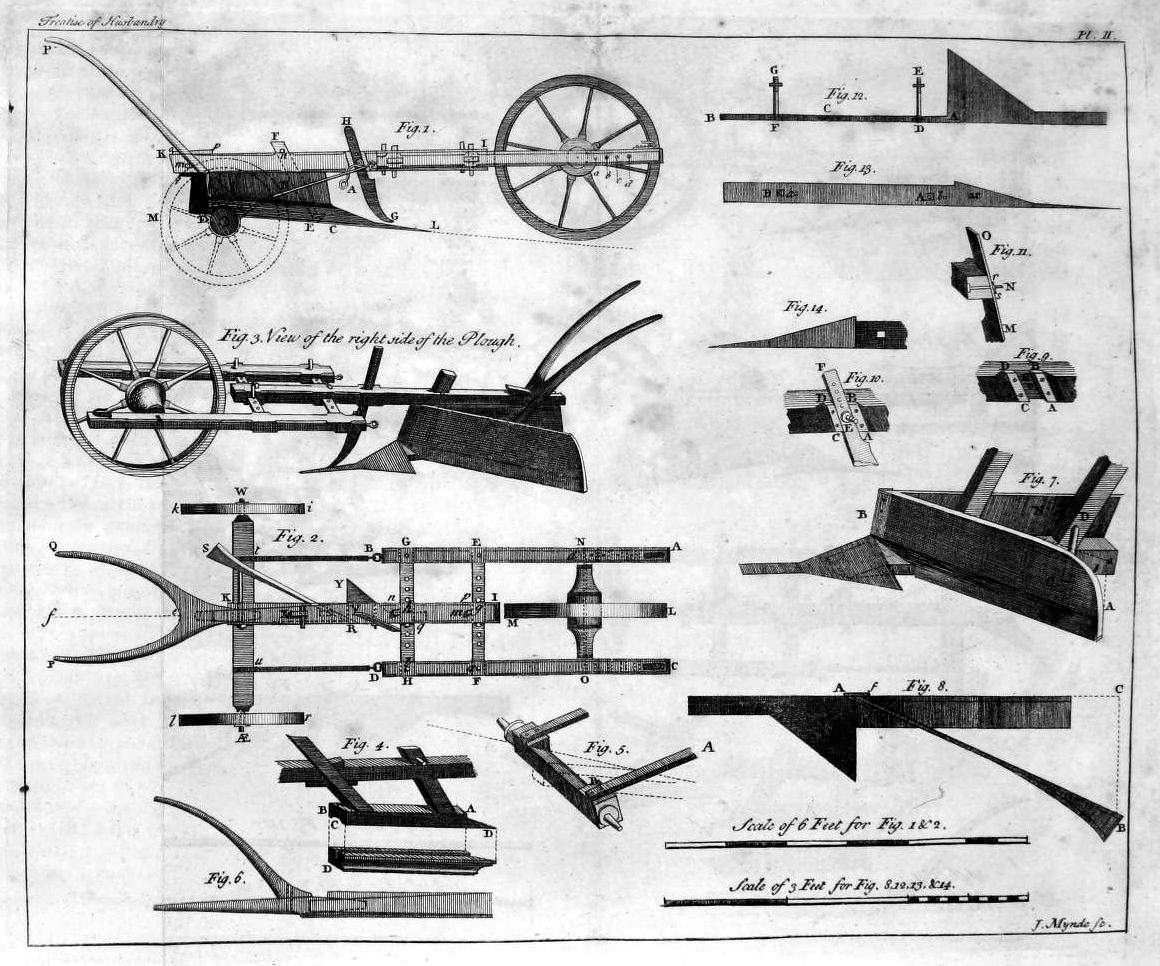
Plate II

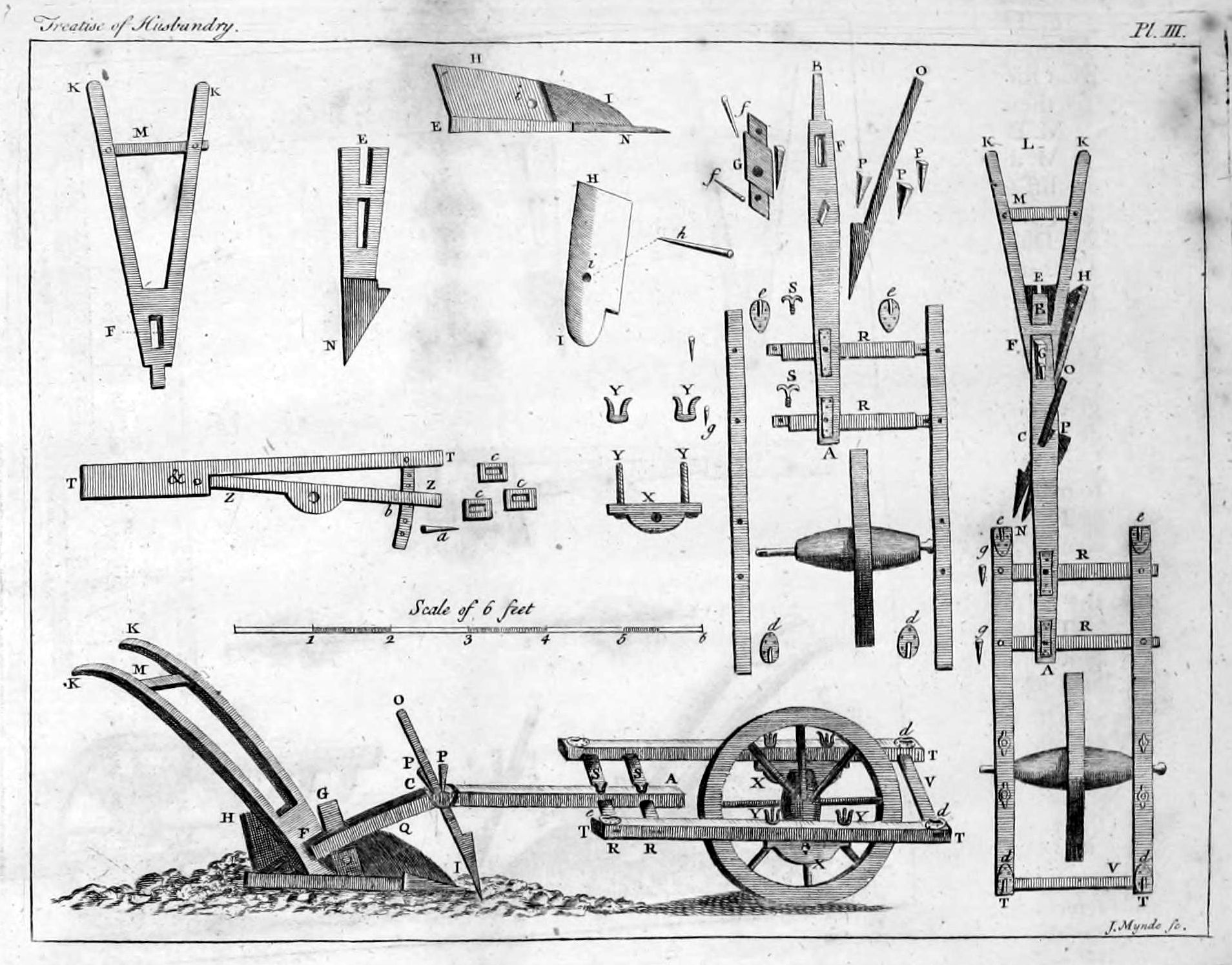
Plate III

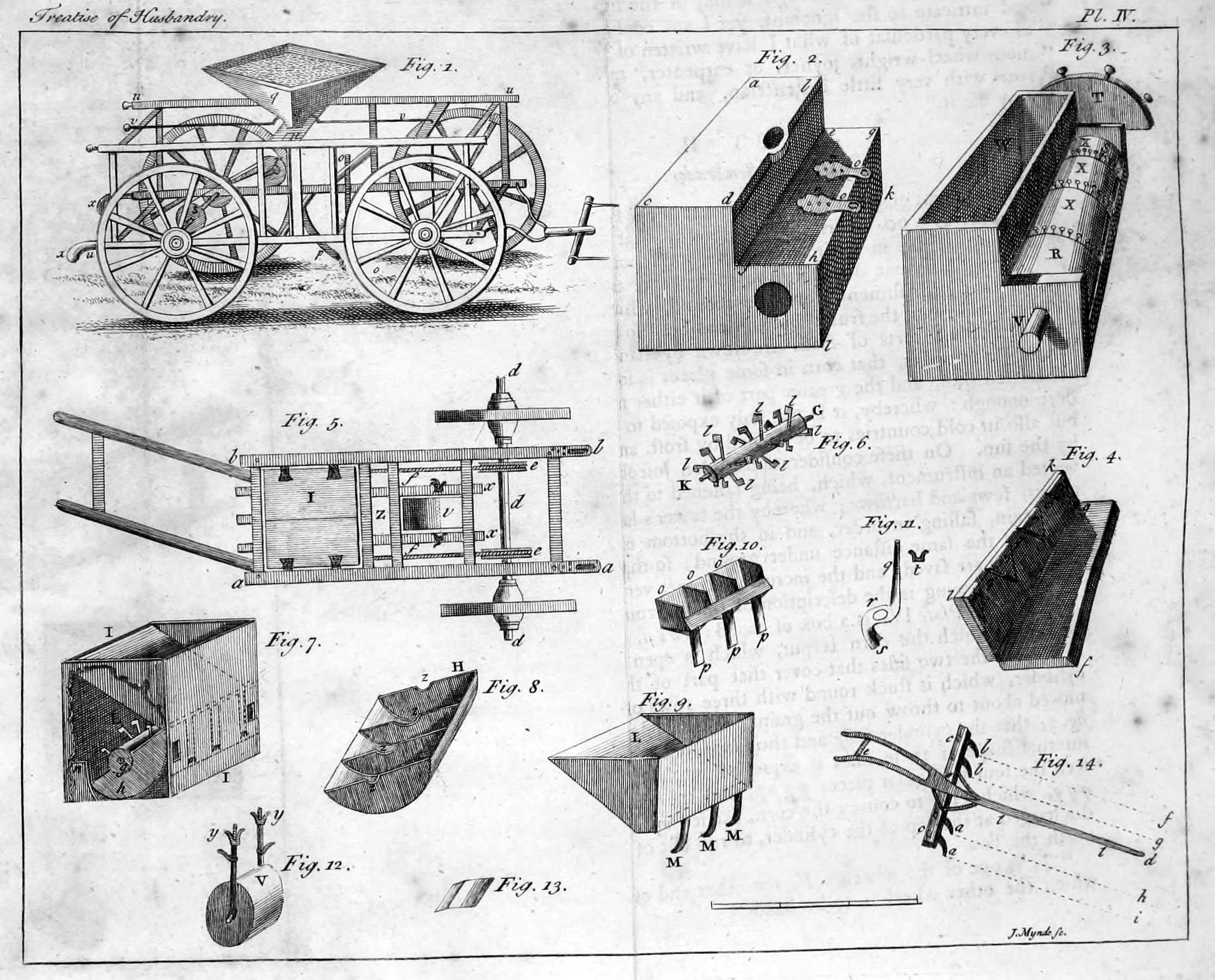
Plate IV

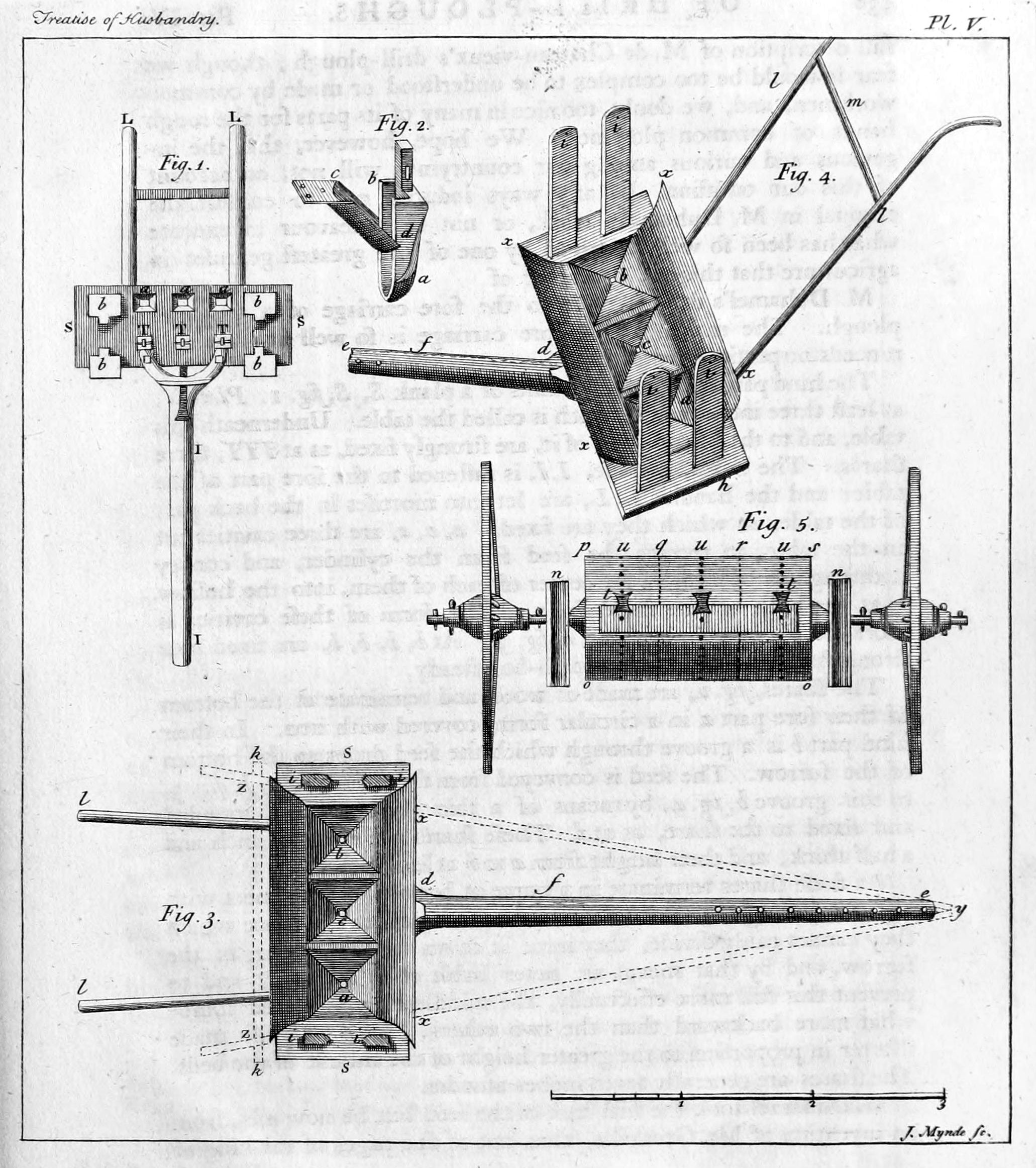
Plate V

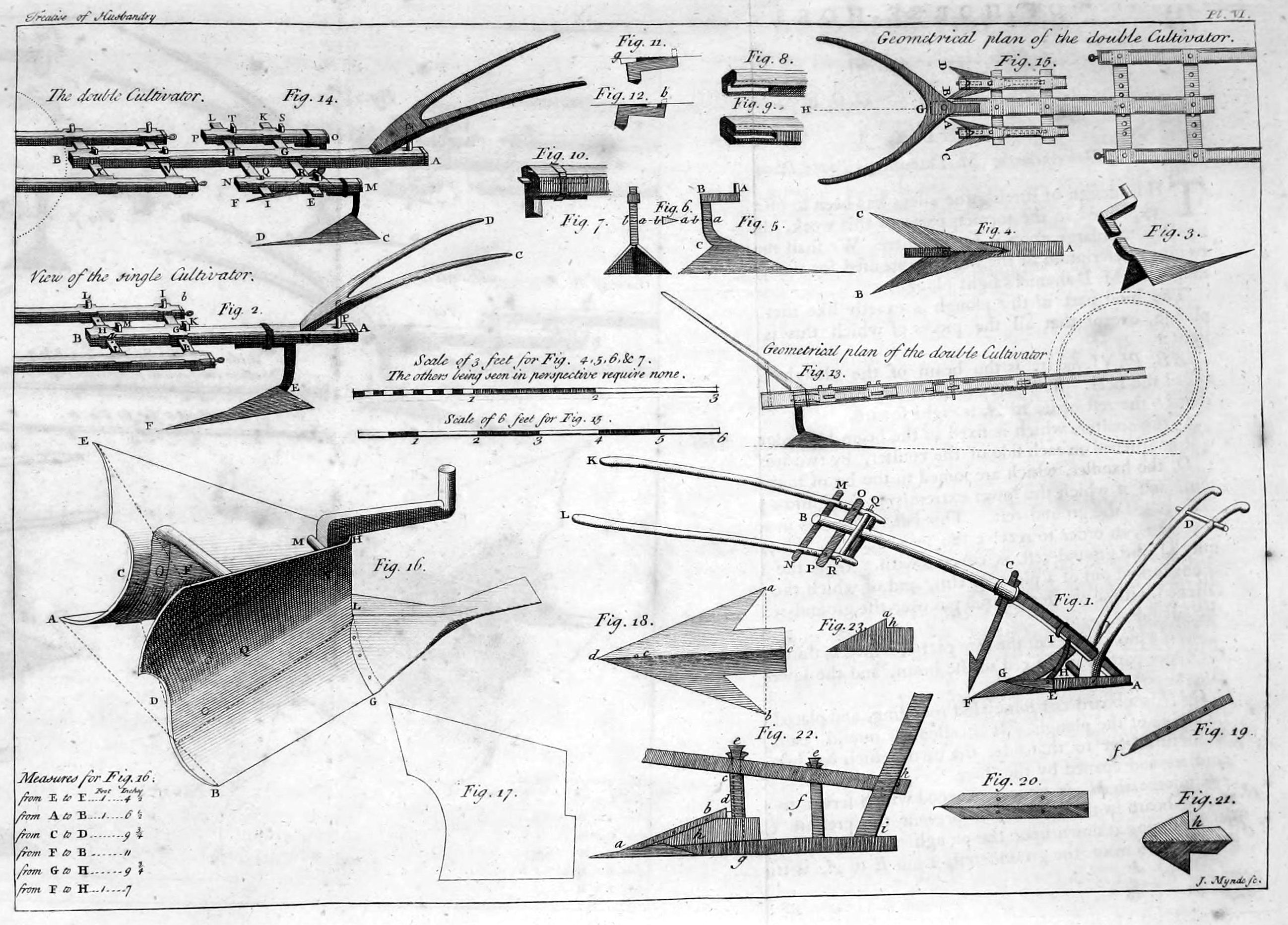
Plate VI

=== Memoirs of the court of Augustus, 1763 ===
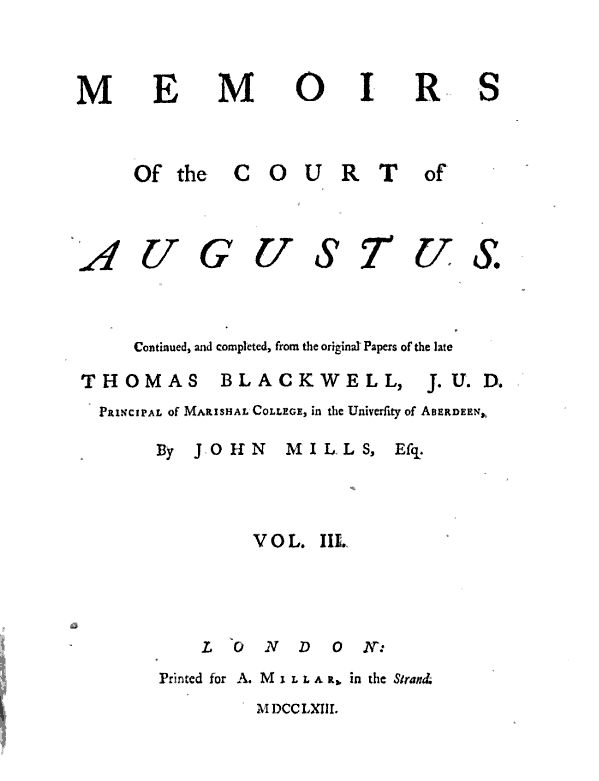
Memoirs of the Court of Augustus, Vol. 3, 1763

Another of Mills' projects was the continuation and completion of the third volume of Memoirs of the court of Augustus in 1763 from the original papers of Thomas Blackwell. Blackwell's works, including An Enquiry into the Life and Writings of Homer (1735), Letters Concerning Mythology (1748) and Memoirs of the Court of Augustus (3 vols., 1753–63), established him as one of the premier figures in the Scottish Enlightenment. Blackwell had published the first two volumes between 1753 and 1757, and the third volume was printed off to p. 144, when Blackwell died. An advertisement prefixed to this volume explained the continuation:

"The proprietor, unwilling to let the sets of those gentlemen who had purchased the former volumes remain incomplete, put all the papers left by the author, relative to this work, into the hands of the present editor, who begs leave to observe, that those papers being, in general, Little more than loose leaves, detached notes, memorandums, and, very often, only bare hints of things intended to be said, without any connection, reference to each other, or even paging, he hopes he may justly claim some indulgence from the public, wherever he has erred in his endeavours to give them the order and method which he imagines might have been Dr. Blackwell's, if that gentleman had lived to finish his work."

Mills further stated Blackwell's loose papers were deficient, and he had to recourse to the Ancients. A review of this work by Tobias Smollett in The Critical Review: Or, Annals of Literature stated, that "it is impossible for us to ascertain the particular passages of this publication that belong to Mr. Mills; but we will venture to say, upon the whole, that this volume, both in point of composition and language, is not inferior to its two elder brothers."

=== A new and complete system of practical husbandry, 1762–1765 ===
John Mills wrote A new and complete system of practical husbandry, in five volumes, which were published between 1762 and 1765. The full titles of this work was:

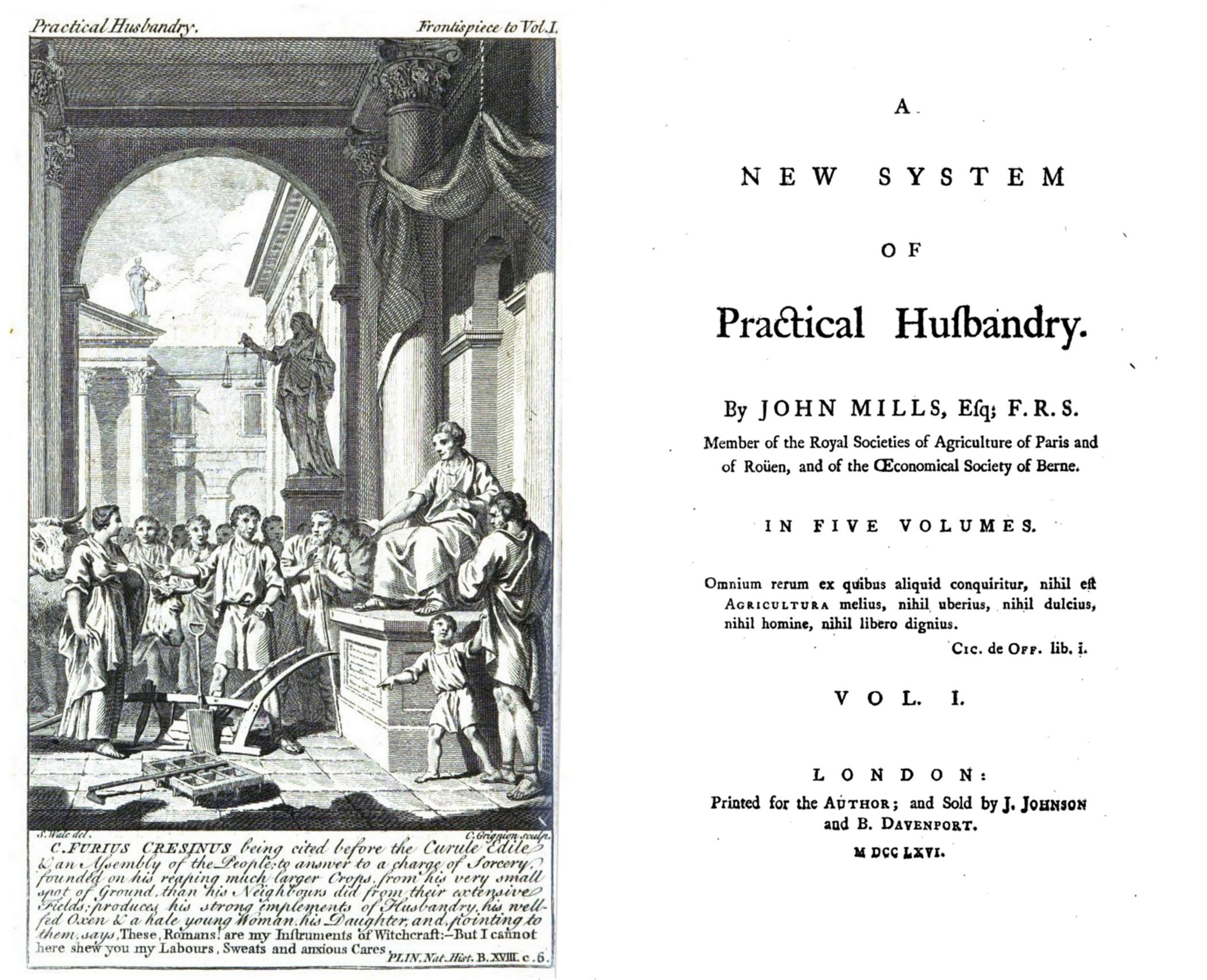
Title page of A new and complete system of practical husbandry by John Mills, 1767

A new and complete system of practical husbandry, containing all that experience has proved to be most useful in farming, either in the old or new method, with a comparative view of both, and whatever is beneficial to the husbandman, or conducive 'to the ornament and improvement of the country gentleman's estate;

The five volumes of a new and complete system of husbandry, by Mills, is the first publication on agriculture that presents all the branches of the art within the compass of one work. John Worlidge began the attempt, but failed in the comprehension that is required.

- The first volume of Mills treats "soils" in the different kinds, clays, sands, and loams; manures, animal and vegetable, and composts; of the improvement of moorlands, and boggy lands and all uncultivated lands; the culture of grain and pulse; the sowing and change of crops; the culture of wheat, and rye, oats, barley, maize, or Indian corn, millet, panic, rice, buckwheat; culture of pulse, viz., beans, peas, vetches, lentils, and lupines.
- Volume II. contains the horse-hoeing husbandry of grain and pulse; the distempers of corn.
- Volume III. treats the enemies of corn; preservation of grain, turnips, potatoes, cabbages, clover, sainfoin, lucerne, cytisus, burnet, natural grasses; enclosing, and the situation of farms and farm houses.
- Volume IV. contains "Gardening, and the culture of hops and olive"."
- Volume V. treats " The making and managing o fermented liquors," and concludes with hemp, flax, madder, woad, weld, or dyer's weed, and a long appendix to each volume.

Mills leads all the previous authors in the arrangement of his work, which undoubtedly carried away the palm of agricultural writing at the time of its appearance. He joins extensively with John Evelyn and Henri-Louis Duhamel du Monceau, and does ample justice to the system of cultivation proposed by Jethro Tull. Turnips and potatoes were in general use, and the Rotherham plough is figured in the work, as are also thirteen of the natural grasses.

Potatoes are entered in this work for the first time as a vegetable in the field cultivation, being about 150 years after the use of the plant was known as an esculent root. Mills quotes the authority of Miller in proof of its value and extensive utility. This author conveys his meaning and intelligence in the true style of writing—cool and plausible, and with becoming diffidence on all scientific disquisitions. No dogmatism mars the placid tenor of his story.

Mills was a great stickler for small farms, almost cottier allotments; he did not see that any single bodily labour can effect but very little unless in combination, and that extensive projects employ most labour, and produce the largest results. A thick mist long clouded the human vision on that and similar points, and is not yet dispelled.

=== Other works ===
The full titles of his other works Mills authored were:

- "A treatise on cattle, showing the most approved methods of breeding, rearing, and fitting for use horses, asses, mules, horned cattle, sheep, goats, and swine, with directions for the proper treatment of them in their several diseases. To which is added a dissertation on their contagious diseases, carefully collected from the best authorities, and interspersed with remarks."
- "An essay on the management of bees; wherein is shown the method of rearing these useful insects, and that the practice of saving their lives when their honey and wax are taken from them was known to the ancients, and is in itself simple and easily executed;"
- "An essay on the weather, with remarks on the shepherd of Banbury's rules forjudging of its changes, and directions for preserving lives and buildings from the fatal effects of lightning;"

The treatise on cattle is an octavo volume of 491 pages, and treats horses, asses, mules, horned cattle, sheep, goats, and swine, with the cures of their disorders, which have a dissertation on their nature. The matter is more descriptive than that of Bradley, but not so practical in the application, though much merit is attached to the knowledge it shows of the origin and progress of the different animals.

Mills also translated "Duhamel's husbandry;" in 1759, "Natural and chemical elements of agriculture, from the Latin of Gustavus Adolphus Gyllenborg;" in 1770, and he was the reputed author of some essays, moral, philosophical, and political.

== Legacy ==
In the field of agricultural science John Mills was a proponent of a new movement named "horse-hoeing husbandry" or "new husbandry". This was based on the work of Jethro Tull, and supported by Henri-Louis Duhamel du Monceau in France, Michel Lullin de Chateauvieux in Switzerland, Mills in England. Mills translated their work, and introduced it in England, wherein for example Arthur Young learned about the work of Louis François Henri de Menon. In return Mills's main work A New and Complete System of Practical Husbandry was translated into German, and had its influence in the main land.

The British The Complete Farmer: Or, a General Dictionary of Husbandry 3rd ed. (1777). The Complete Farmer, listed John Mills in the subtitle of this work among the foremost authorities in the field of Husbandry of his time. Other people mentioned in this context were Carl Linnaeus, Louis François Henri de Menon, Hugh Plat, John Evelyn, John Worlidge, John Mortimer, Jethro Tull, William Ellis, Philip Miller, Thomas Hale, Edward Lisle, Roque, and Arthur Young.

In the 19th century Donaldson (1854) in his Agricultural Biography, credited Mills' Practical Husbandry for being the "first publication on agriculture that presents all the branches of the art within the compass of one work. 'Worlidge began the attempt, but failed in the comprehension required." However, by then most of the work of the proponents of "horse-hoeing husbandry" had become obsolete, due to the rapid progress of agriculture in those days. Specifically Mills' Practical Husbandry was used as reference until the 1820s. Other of his works have also been credited until in our days. For example The Management of Bees, was called "one of the bee books which are worth reading over and over again." And the An Essay in the Weather Mills is considered unmatched for a long time "despite two centuries of philosophical work."

== Selected publications ==
- Thomas Blackwell, John Mills (historical writer.) Memoirs of the court of Augustus. Continued and completed by John Mills. A. Millar. 1753–63
- Jean-Baptiste Louis Crévier. The History of the Roman Emperors, from Augustus to Constantine, by Mr. Crevier, professor of rhetoric in the college of Beauvais. Translated from the French by John Mills. (10 volumes) 1755; Vol 1; Vol. 9
- Duhamel du Monceau. A Practical Treatise of Husbandry. J. Whiston and B. White, London 1759. Translated from the French by John Mills.
- John Mills. A New and Complete System of Practical Husbandry. London 1762–1765 (5 volumes): volume 1; Volume 2 Volume 3; Volume 4; Volume 5 ; German translation Volume 5, 1769
- John Mills. An Essay on the Management of Bees. London 1766
- Gustavus Adolphus Gyllenborg. The Natural and Chemical Elements of Agriculture. Translated from the Latin by John Mills, 1770.
- John Mills. An Essay on the Weather. London 1770; Dutch translation, Amsterdam, 1772.
- John Mills. Essays moral, philosophical and political. S. Hooper, 1772
- John Mills. A Treatise on Cattle. 1776
