= Michel Lullin de Chateauvieux =

Genevan nobleman, agronomist and experimenter on agriculture

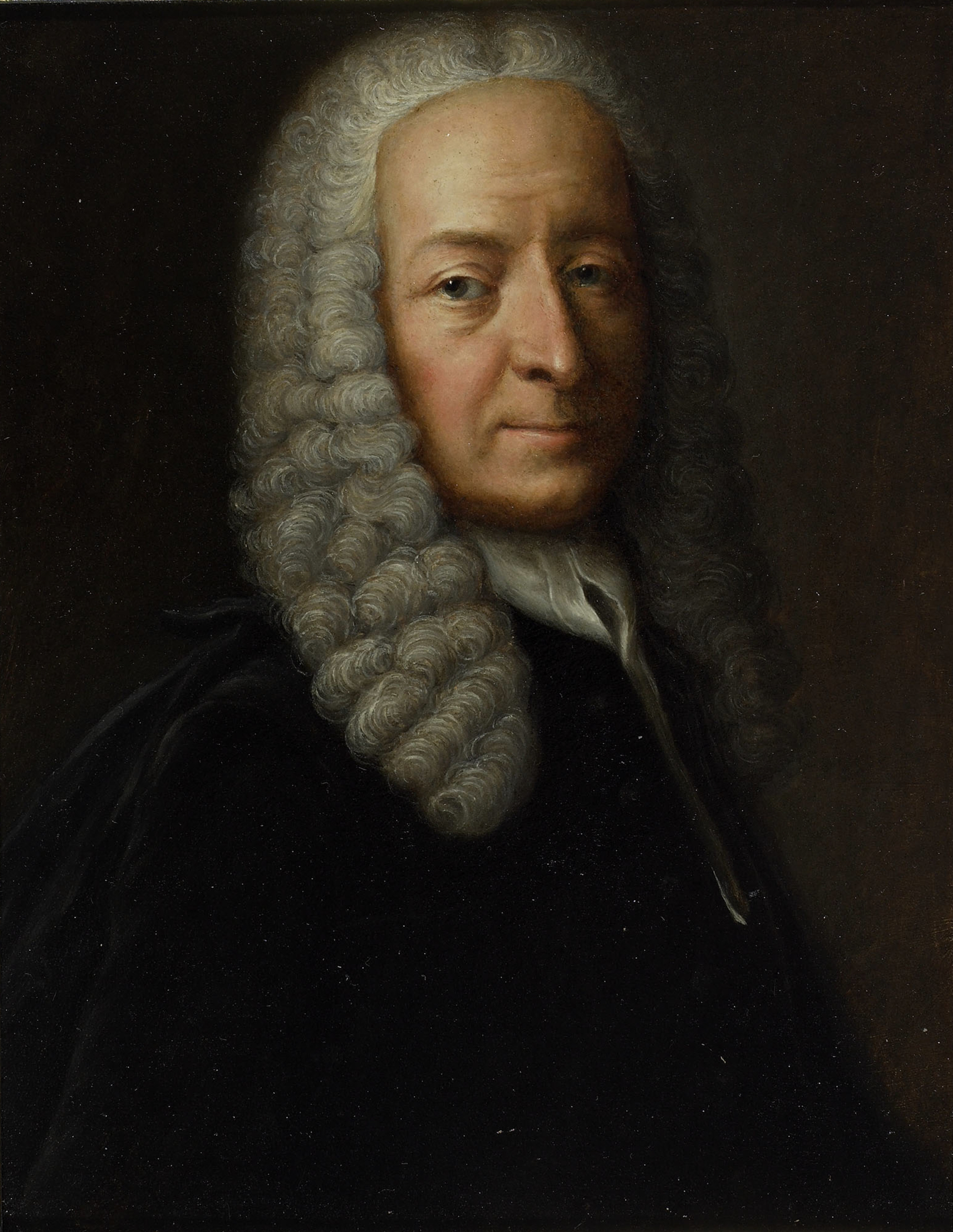
- Portrait by Robert Gardelle
- Born: 15 September 1695; Geneva, Republic of Geneva
- Died: 19 March 1781 (aged 85); Geneva, Republic of Geneva
- Education: Academy of Geneva
- Known for: Design of agricultural instruments

Michel Lullin de Châteauvieux (15 September 1695 - 19 March 1781) was a Genevan politician, agronomist and experimenter on agriculture, known for the design of many agricultural instruments.

== Biography ==
Michel Lullin de Chateauvieux was born into a patrician family in Geneva, Republic of Geneva. He was the son of Charles Lullin de Chateauvieux (1669-1761), a councilor and syndic of Geneva, and Marthe Humbert. Lullin studied philosophy at the Academy of Geneva and began working as a lawyer in 1714. He inherited from his father the seigneuries of Châteauvieux, Challex (Pays de Gex) and Confignon.

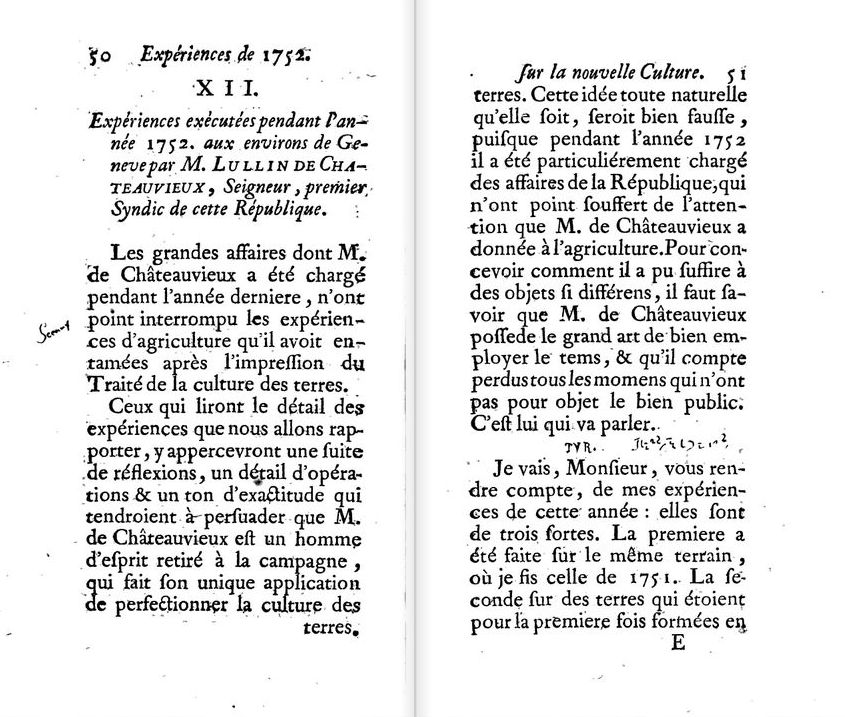
Lullin's letter published as article in Duhamel (1753)

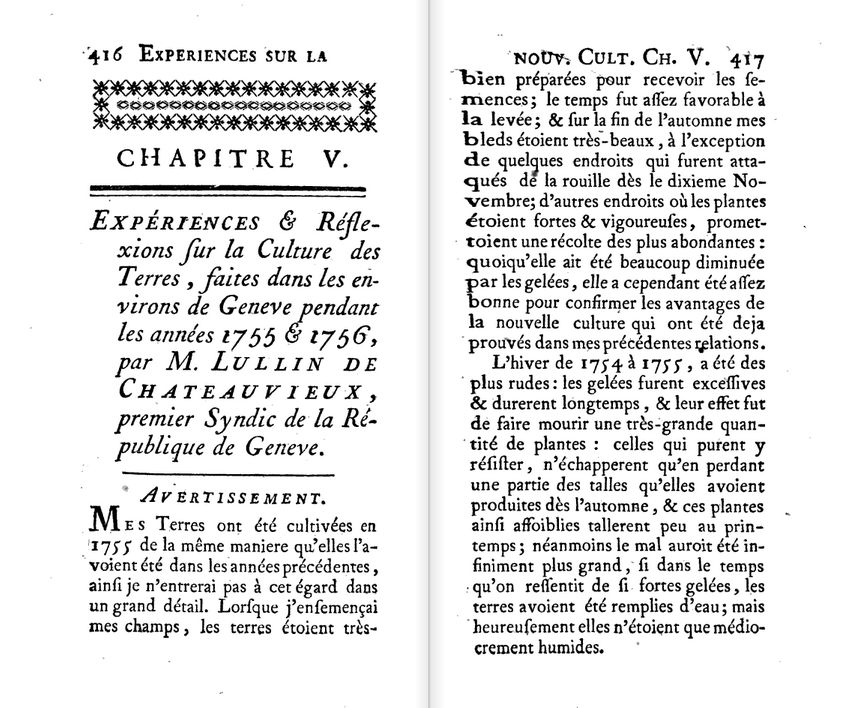
Advertisement for Expériences et réflexions sur la culture des terres, 1757

Lullin began his political career as châtelain of Peney and councilor in 1738. During the riots of 1734, he, Pierre Mussard and Jean-Louis Du Pan commissioned Jean-Jacques Burlamaqui to report on the notices of appeal of the old citizens (citoyens) and of the new citizens (bourgeois). Lullin served three terms as Syndic of the Republic of Geneva in the period between 1740 and 1748, and seven terms as First Syndic between 1752 and 1777.

Lullin devoted much of his spare time to agricultural experiments, corresponded internationally with Henri Louis Duhamel du Monceau from France on agricultural matters, and co-founded the "Société pour l'encouragement des Arts et de l'Agriculture" (Society for the Encouragement of Arts and Agriculture) in 1763/1776. Among the many agricultural instruments he designed and improved was a seed drill invented in 1754. He corresponded about his work with Henri Louis Duhamel du Monceau, who published some of these letters in his Traité de la culture des terres suivant les principes de M. Tull, Anglois. (Treaty of land cultivation following the principles of the English Mr. Tull) in 6 volumes, 1750-56. Lullin also corresponded with other scientists of his time, such as Jean-Jacques Rousseau, Voltaire, and George Washington.

Lullin married Susanne Saladin (1699-1774) on 22 September 1720, and they had four children. Among his grandsons were the author Charles Jean Marc Lullin de Châteauvieux (1752-1833) and the banker Michel Lullin de Chateauvieux (1754-1802). Part of the family were residents of Choully Castle.

== Work ==
Lullin successfully conducted several experiments to increase crops, particularly cabbage, lucerne, and developed several agricultural implements. He corresponded about the outcomes of his work with Duhamel, who published his letters as articles in his Traité de la culture des terres suivant les principes de M. Tull, Anglois.

One of his discoveries, according to Walter Harte (1764), was "the method of transplanting lucerne; and restoring old pasturage without laying them down in corn."

=== On cabbages ===
In the 18th century cabbages had been cultivated as food for cattle. Lullin successfully conducted several experiments to increase the crops. He reported the following findings in a letter to M. Duhamel, which was translated and published in the article on cabbages in The Complete Farmer (1777):

"I began by retrenching the dung; though the spot I chose for my first trial had not received any for several years. It had indeed been well prepared by ploughing the preceding year, when one half of it bore barley, and the other oats. I now made it into a bed, the middle of which was directly over the last year's furrow. I ploughed this bed on the twenty-fifth of September, 1751, in the same manner as if it had been intended for wheat. I planted on it a single row of white cabbages, which I watered to make them take root the better. The length of this bed was one hundred and sixty feet, and its breadth six feet seven inches."

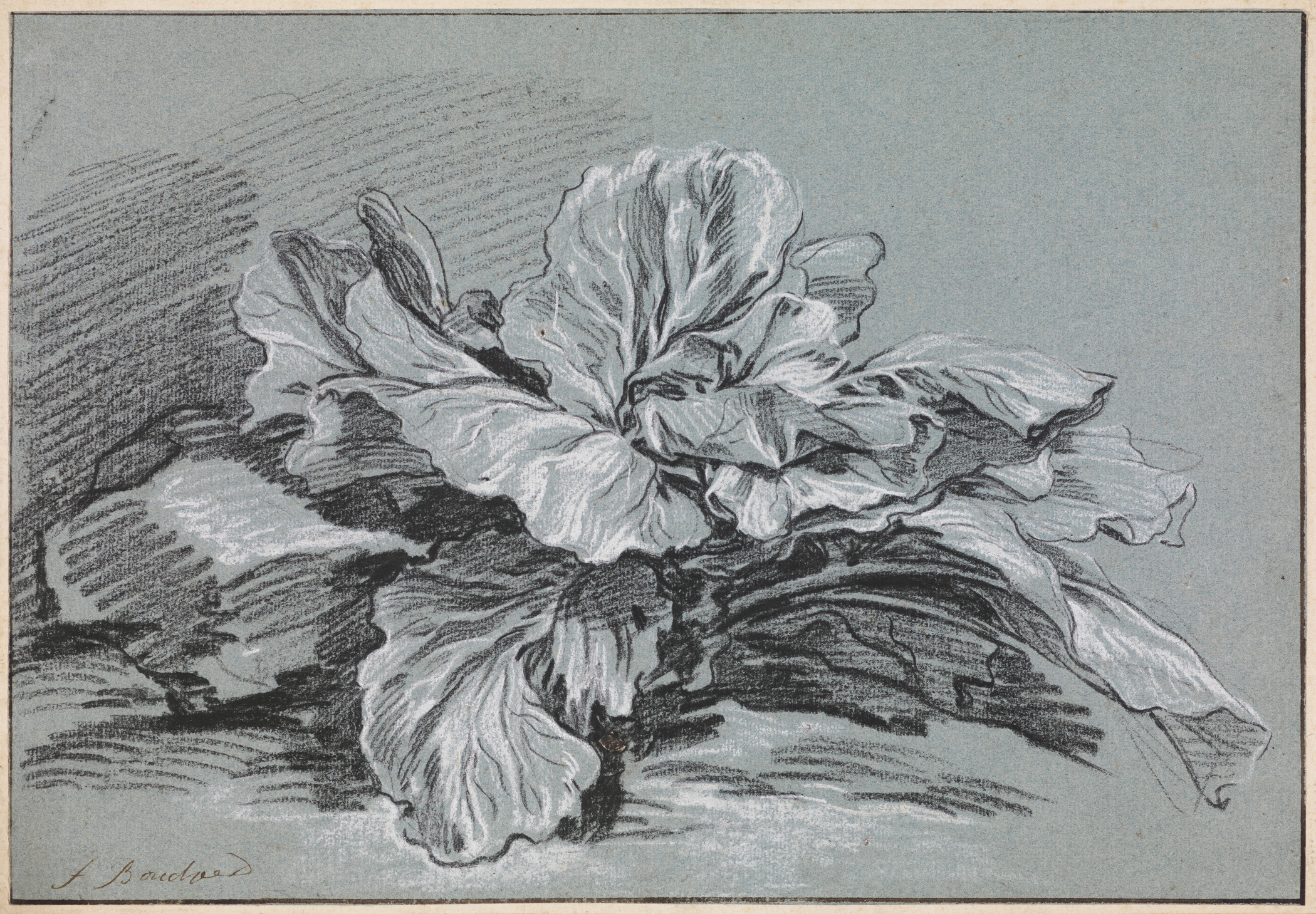
Study of a Cabbage by François Boucher, 1735

"That I might be able to make a just comparison between the cabbages of this bed, and those of the kitchen garden, I planted a spot of ground in the latter, the same day, with the same sort of plants. This spot had been extremely well dug, and plentifully dunged by the gardener, who took all possible care of these plants during the summer, and weeded them as often as was necessary.

"Instead of cabbaging, most of them ran up in height: upon which I plucked them up, and planted others in their stead."

"I bestowed the same care and culture on my row of cabbages in the bed, as if they had been wheat."

"On the ninth of March 1752, the alleys were stirred with the plough. On the twenty-fifth of April, I gave them a second stirring with the cultivator. On the third of June they had a third stirring with the plough: and on the twentieth of July, I made my gardener hand-hoe them, for fear the plough should damage several stalks of wheat which grew on the next bed, and were bent, but not lodged."

"These cabbages were never watered, except once, which was at the time of planting them; and yet they were always crisp and firm, even in the hottest days. By this easy and expeditious culture, they attained all the perfection that could be desired; and surpassed those of the kitchen-garden, as much in goodness, as they did in bulk. Most of them weighed between fifteen and eighteen pounds, and the smallest between eight and ten. The weight of all the plants which grew on this bed, was 840 pounds."

The Complete Farmer article comments that "the circumstance of the cabbages continuing firm and crisp in the hottest weather, is remarkable." Yet, the work reported that a similar experiment in England upon cabbages had made the same observations, and it was explained as an effect of good and deep hoeing as predicted by Jethro Tull.

=== On lucerne ===
Lucerne is the name of the alfalfa, which arose in France, Germany and Britain in the 16th century from the Provençal luzerno ("glow worm"), due to its shiny seeds. In the 1750s Lullin had experimented extensively on producing lucerne in beds, cultivated according to new husbandry, over several years. Most of the 25-page article on lucerne in The Complete Farmer (1777) was devoted to the outcomes of these experiments.

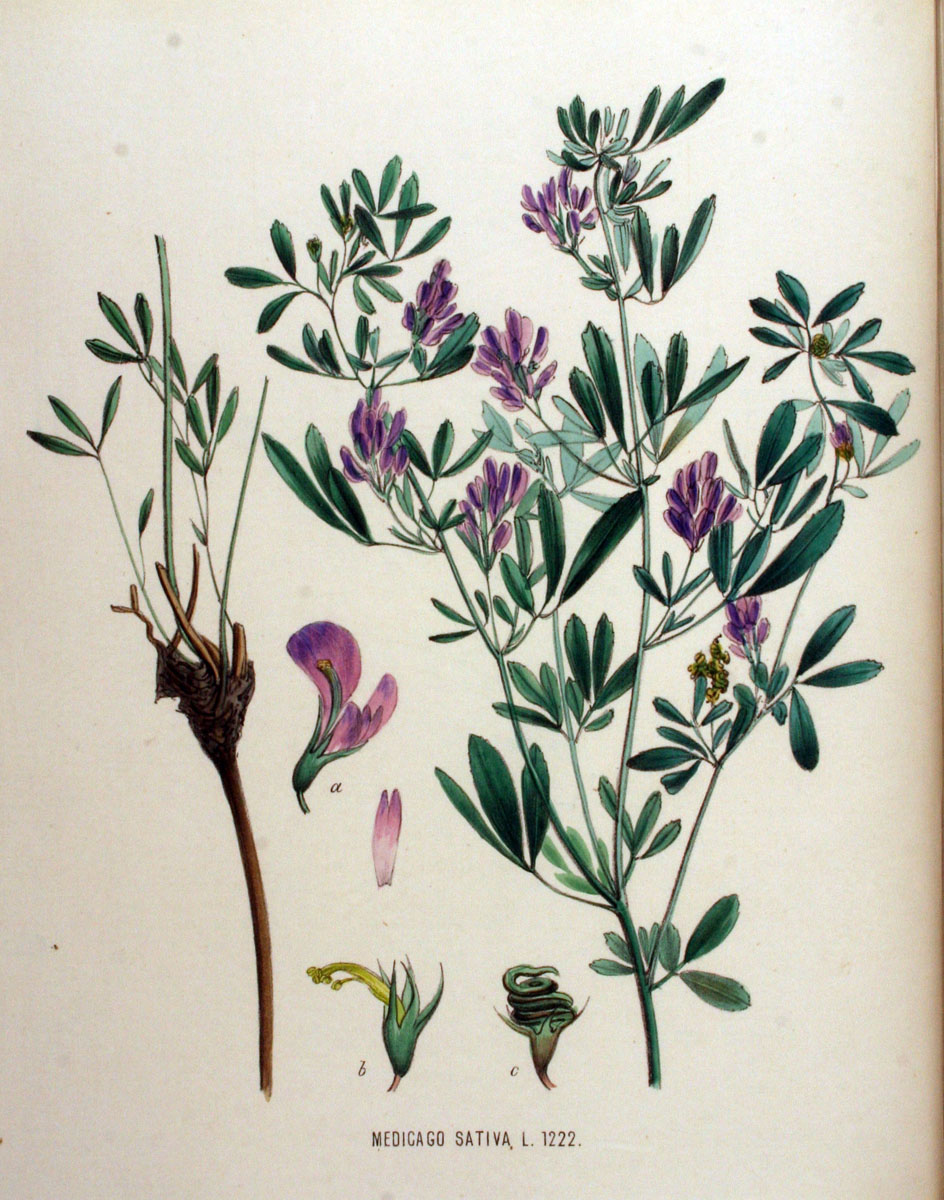
Lucerne in Flora Batava, Jan Kops et al. (1814)

Although Lullin agreed with M. Duhamel and other participants of the new husbandry, that lucerne and sainfoin thrive best when cultivated in beds, his practice differed in many respects from theirs. In his experiments he had some explicit expectations:

"Lucern grows naturally with one large perpendicular, or tap-root, which penetrates very deep into the earth, and has few, if any, lateral roots. From similar experiments on other tap-rooted plants, I was induced to think, that this too, by transplanting it, and at the same time cutting off part of its tap-root, might be made to shoot out several horizontal roots, which, reaching into the loose mould of the alleys, and extending themselves there, would collect a greater quantity of nourishment for the plant, and consequently enable it to produce more abundant crops."

The lucerne he had planted pushed out numbers of large lateral roots, and these branched out again into others, which according to him "may be multiplied without end by frequent culture of the alleys: for the horse-hoe has the fame effect on these horizontal roots as cutting has upon the.tap-root." About the method of transplanting the lucerne, Lullin explained:

"I made several beds, some about three feet wide, (including the alleys) into, which I transplanted a single row of lucerne; others about three feet nine inches, into which I transplanted two rows and others about four feet three inches wide, in which I put three rows. The design of this variation was, to see by which of these three methods the same extent of ground would produce the greatest quantity of lucerne. I believe it will require five or six years to determine exactly which of them will be best; because, as the plants increase every year in bulk, their produce alters, and may perhaps not keep in proportion to their first years, though probably the difference would not be great."

"The plants in the single rows were six inches asunder, nor should they ever be nearer; and those in the double and triple rows, were eight or nine inches distant from each other. I must observe, that I likewise sowed lucerne with the drill, in beds, in which it has remained without transplanting. It is very fine; but not near so strong and flourishing as that which I transplanted. When lucerne is sown where it is to remain, it necessarily requires being thinned, and that operation takes up more time than transplanting it would do."

This led to the design of a series of rules to be observed in transplanting lucerne into beds:

1. "The middle of the beds must be raised and arched as high as possible; and as the lucerne is to remain several years on the same ground, no pains should be spared to prepare the earth as well as can be."
2. "Lucerne should be sown in the spring, and in a rich mould, that the plants may be strong enough to transplant in September."
3. "3. Plants two or three years old may be transplanted as well as younger ones."

=== Drill plough ===
J. Balfour's Select Essays on Husbandry (1767), with extracts from the Museum Rusticum and other foreign essays on agriculture, mentioned the drill-ploughs invented by M. Duhamel and Lullin.

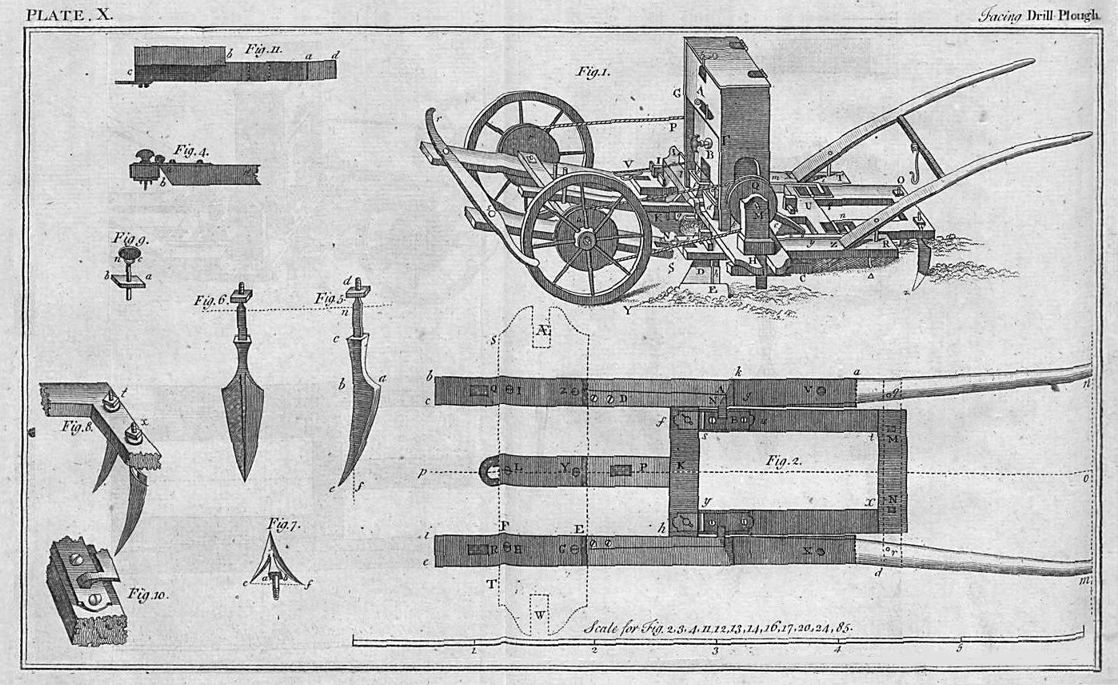
Drill plough in The complete Farmer, plate X

"The gentlemen abroad who are now promoting the new husbandry, have gone into the practice of planting three rows upon every ridge, supporting that to be the best method; and the drill-ploughs invented by M. Du Hamel, and Lullin, are constructed to sow three rows. Mr Mills also, the editor of M. Du Hamel's Husbandry, tells us, that he declined giving a description of Mr Tull's drill, because it was so complex, which, indeed, it was for lowing three rows; but, as it is now altered, is not so complicated as Lullin's drill, and is easily made a more general instrument for sowing upon ridges, or upon the level; and has this advantage beyond any of the foreign drills that I have seen, that, the two wheels which serve to turn the spindle, and deliver the seed, do, at the same time, mark the exact distances of the next rows to be drilled, upon level ground; so that a field, of any extent, may be planted with it, at the distances intended, with great exactness."

Balfour concluded that "from the practice of the gentlemen abroad, and other instances that might be given at home, it is evident, that they have not seen the additions that Mr Tull made to his Essay, in which, besides his different method of drilling, there are several very material improvements in the manner of hoeing and cultivating wheat, and other crops; and from these last parts of his work may be also seen, that the reports of his bad success, in repeated wheat-crops, are without any just foundation."

Beside the drill-plough, Lullin also developed a single cultivator, both described in John Mills's A New System of Practical Husbandry (1767). These works was later reviewed by Tobias George Smollett (1775). In his Letters concerning the present state of the French nation (1769) Arthur Young was far less positive. He criticised the design for his complex design and lack of maintainability, stating:

"The drill plough, which Lullin recommends to his readers, and which he used himself, is a most complicate [sic] machine, infinitely difficult to make, any where, [sic] and impossible to repair in a village, besides the first cost of it, being very considerable.
It must surely appear from these circumstances that all Lullin proves is, that a man when he has a drill plough given him, may use it if it wants no repairs to great advantage comparatively with the common husbandry, as already set forth. But it must be very apparent that multitudes of new experiments are yet necessary to prove the New husbandry (supposing a drill plough invented as simple as possible) equal to the old, where the latter is practised in a more advantageous manner, than about Lullin."

Two years later Young (1771) explained that among his many experiments he did make a single cultivator based on Lullin's instructions with some additional improvements.

== Legacy ==
In his days Lullin's work on husbandry was often cited in du Monceau's A Practical Treatise of Husbandry, and in The Complete Farmer: Or, a General Dictionary of Husbandry 3rd ed. (1777). The Complete Farmer even listed Lullin in the subtitle of this work among the foremost authorities. Other people mentioned in this context were Carl Linnaeus, Louis François Henri de Menon, Hugh Plat, John Evelyn, John Worlidge, John Mortimer, Jethro Tull, William Ellis, Philip Miller, Thomas Hale, Edward Lisle, Roque, John Mills, and Arthur Young.

Over half a century later, The Penny Cyclopædia (1833) gave a summary of the so-called "horse-hoeing husbandry" or "new husbandry":

"The influence of the atmosphere on the soil, and the increased fertility produced by pulverizing and stirring heavy lands, has led to the notion adopted by Jethro Tull, that labour might entirely supersede the necessity of manure: hence the origin of the horse-hoeing husbandry, which at one time was so highly thought of as to be called, by way of distinction, the new husbandry. Fallows and manuring were both discarded as unnecessary; the seed was sown in rows with wide intervals, which were continually kept worked and stirred. At first the result was highly satisfactory; all the humus, by exposure to the air, was converted into soluble extract, and taken up by the plants, which throve well as long as the supply lasted: but in the end it was exhausted; and the wannest admirers and supporters of Tull's system, Du Hamel and De Chateauvieux, besides many others, found to their cost, in practice, that pulverizing alone will not restore fertility. The system of drilling and horse-hoeing, when united with judicious manuring, has, however, been found a great improvement in agriculture."

== Selected publications ==
Books:

- Michel Lullin de Chateauvieux. Description d'un nouveau semoir inventé - invente par M. Lullin de Chateauvieux, syndic et juge de police de la ville et de la republique de Geneve - avec figures en taille-douce.. 1754, 158 p.
- Michel Lullin de Chateauvieux. Expériences et réflexions sur la culture des terres, faites aux environs des Genève, dans les années 1754, 1755 et 1756.

Lullin's letters were published in:

- Henri Louis Duhamel du Monceau Traité de la culture des terres suivant les principes de M. Tull, Anglois. 6 vol. 1750-56
