= The complete farmer =

The term The complete farmer is a book title, and can refer to:

- The Complete Practical Farmer by R.H. Budd (1835) credited for introducing the mowing of wheat in England.
- The Compleat Farmer: Or, the Whole Art of Husbandry. by Robert Brown of Hill Farm, Somersetshire. London, 1759.
- The Complete Farmer: Or, a General Dictionary of Husbandry, English-language encyclopaedia on agriculture first published in 1768.
- The complete farmer and rural economist, American compendium on agriculture by Thomas G. Fessenden first edition in 1834.
