= John Mortimer (agriculturalist) =

English merchant and writer on agriculture

- Born: c. 1656
- Died: 1736
- Father: Mark Mortimer

John Mortimer (c. 1656 – 1736) was an English merchant, and writer on agriculture, known for The whole Art of Husbandry, in the way of Managing and Improving of Land published in London in 1707.

== Biography ==
John was born in 1656, the only son and heir of Mark Mortimer, grocer of London, by his wife Abigail Walmesley of Blackmore in Essex, who married 3 October 1651 in the parish of St Anne and St Agnes, London. His father was born into a yeoman family of Bow, Devon, and had a brother Peter who also entered into a commercial profession. John Mortimer received a commercial education, and became a prosperous merchant on Tower Hill.

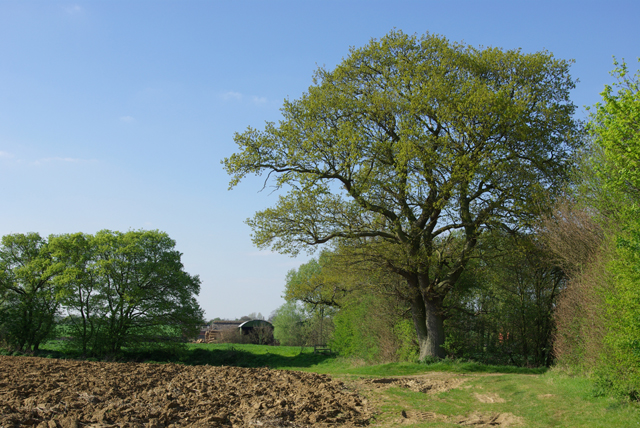
Land with a farmhouse in the back in Hatfield Peverel.

In November 1693, at the age of about 43, he bought the estate of Topping Hall, Hatfield Peverel, Essex, which he improved; a number of cedar trees planted by him were still in there in the 19th century. Mortimer became Fellow of the Royal Society in December 1705.

Mortimer was married three times. His first wife, Dorothy, born at Hursley, near Winchester, on 1 August 1660, was the ninth child of Richard Cromwell, and it is supposed that the ex-protector's return to England in 1680 was prompted by a desire to be present at the wedding. She died in childbirth (14 May 1681) within a year of the marriage. He married, secondly, Sarah, daughter of Sir John Tippets, knight, surveyor of the navy, by whom he had a son and a daughter. Thirdly, Mortimer married Elizabeth, daughter of Samuel Sanders of Derbyshire, by whom he had four sons and two daughters. The second son was Cromwell Mortimer.

== Works ==
Mortimer wrote Some Considerations concerning the present State of Religion, with some Essays towards our Love and Union, London, 1702, against sectarian feeling, Advice to Parents, or Rules for the Education of Children, London, 1704, and The whole Art of Husbandry, in 1707.

=== The whole Art of Husbandry, 1707 ===
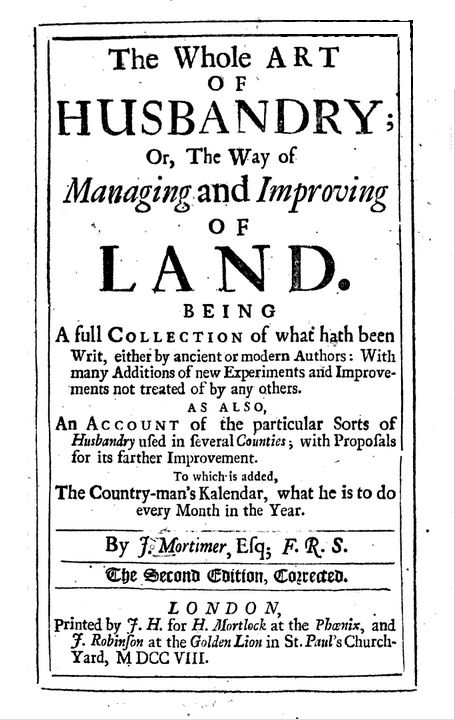
Title page of The whole Art of Husbandry, 1707

Mortimer's The whole Art of Husbandry, in the way of Managing and Improving of Land forms a landmark in English agricultural literature, and largely influenced husbandry in the 18th century. The writer states that he had read the best books on ancient and modern agriculture, and inspected the practice of the most diligent husbandmen in most countries. After duly digesting these he had added his own experiences.

The book, which treats not only of the usual branches of agriculture, but also of fish ponds, orchards, and of the culture of silkworms, and the making of cider, is said by Donaldson (1854) to "form a very large advancement in the progress of agriculture from the preceding authors on the subject. Trees and fruits do still occupy too much room, but the animals are more largely introduced and systematically treated."

The work was dedicated to the Royal Society, of which Mortimer had been admitted a member in December 1705. A second edition was issued in 1708, and a third in 1712, "containing such additions as are proper for the husband- man and gardiner (sic) ... to which is added a Kalendar, shewing what is to be done every month in the flower garden." It was translated into Swedish by Jacob Serenius in 1727, and a sixth edition, with additions, and revised by Thomas Mortimer, the writer's grandson, appeared in 2 volumes in 1761.

=== The whole art of husbandry, content ===
The whole art of husbandry consisted of a total of 15 books, published in one volume, each book divided into chapters on connected subjects. The first book has four chapters – on inclosing lands; of pastures, and meadow lands, how to improve them, and defend by banks from floods and tides; and of making hay; and of several sorts of grass seeds, as clover, sainfoin, and lucerne, – ray grass, trefoil, and several other grasses. The second book has 6 chapters – of arable land and tillage; on ploughs, of which some are figured; and the square earth board is shown and recommended for stiff clays; the Hertfordshire wheel-plough was until in the 19th century much recommended; of ploughing and laying land in ridges; of sowing corn and steeping it. The third book has three chapters, describing the different natures of soils; the ability and power of production.

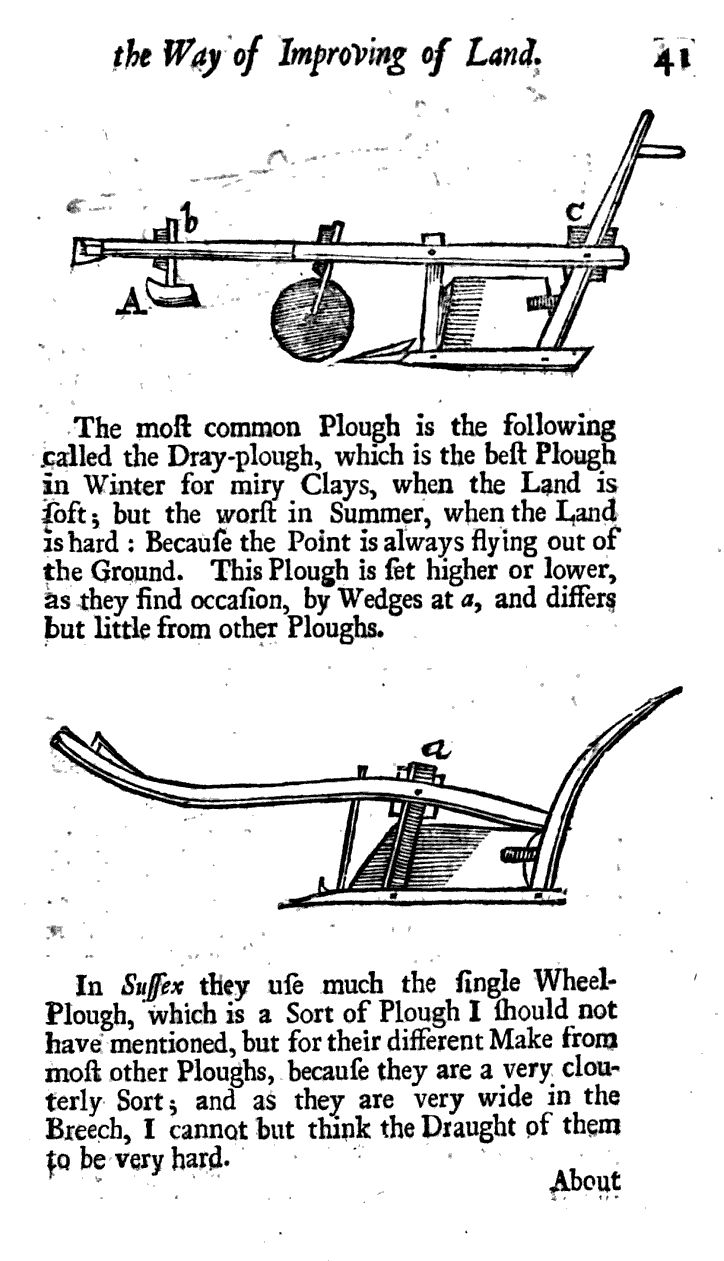
Book 2 of The whole Art of Husbandry, p. 41.

The fourth book has seventeen chapters: I. On the manuring and digging of lands, with observations on each sort of manure; II. Of the burning of land; III. Of chalk; IV. Of lime.; V. Of marl; VI. Of fuller's earth.; VII. Of clay.; VIII. Of sand.; IX. Of earth.; X. Of sea sand and weed.; XI. Of dungs.; XII. Of sheep's dung.; XIII. Of hog's dung.; XIV. Of urine.; XV. Of human ordure.; XVI. Of the dung of fowls.; And XVII. Of several other sorts of manures, as ashes, soap ashes, soot, rags, malt dust, and the several soils each sort of manure is best for.

The fifth book has 25 chapters, on grains and pulse crops, the roots, and herbaceous plants. The sixth book, of 21 chapters, treats on the animals, fowls, and insects that stock the farm. The seventh book, of three chapters, describes the pests of the farm, in four-footed and feathered beasts. The eighth book has five chapters on the uses of corn, and the making of malt. The four chapters of the ninth book treat on the small tools of work. The tenth book has four chapters on buildings and repairs. Book eleven treats on the different trees in 21 chapters. The twelfth book, in 12 chapters, describes coppice woods. The thirteenth book has two chapters on the plants of the kitchen garden. The fourteenth book has 21 chapters on fruit trees. The fifteenth book has five chapters on English liquors, as ale, cyder, and fruit wines.

About agricultural lime, Mortimer prescribed, that it had to be used at the rate of 160 bushels to an acre, and laid in cinders in a bushel to a pole square, covered with earth, and spread when dissolved—but better in being carried hot on the land. It makes corn grow with a thin bark, and does not last above five years. Forty bushels or soot were sown by hand on an acre, and produced a mighty sweet grass. The spade is figured for paring land to be burned, and is the same used in the 19th century. Turnips are sown in broad cast on finely fallowed lands, in midsummer, and afford food for sheep, cows, and fattening cattle into the month of March. The crop is a great help to dry barren lands, and will grow on almost any ground—the fly and caterpillar often destroy them. The crop is thinned by twice hoeing, at an expense of 4s. to 9s. an acre, or in daily wages in that time of fourteen-pence. Stubble turnips were sown at this time of the cultivation of the plant.

On farm animal Mortimer spoke of:

- A bull, which should have a sharp quick countenance, forehead broad and curled, eyes black and large, horns long, neck fleshy, belly long and large, hair smooth like velvet, breast big, back straight and flat, buttocks square, thighs round, legs straight, joints short.
- The cow ought to have a broad forehead, black eyes, clean great horns, neck long and thin, large deep belly, thick thighs, round legs, short joints; white, large, deep udder, having four teats, and the feet large.
- Of sheep, he says, the ram must have a large, long body, forehead broad, round, and well rising, eyes cheerful and large, nostrils short and straight. The ewe must have the neck large and upright, bending like a horse's, back broad, buttocks round, tail thick, legs small and short, clean, and nimble, wool thick and deep, covering all the body; gums must be red, teeth white and even, brisket skinned, eye-strings ruddy, felt loose, wool fast, breath sweet, the feet not hot. Fat pastures are said to produce straight tall sheep, and hills and short pastures breed square ones; woods and mountains yield small and slender sheep. The observations are very judicious on the breeding and management of sheep, and differ little from the modern practice. It appears that many sheep were then rotted.

In 1854 Donaldson concluded that the accompanied "Farmer's Calendar," in directions of monthly work, would do credit to any modern publication. Mortimer also gave an account on rent, stating according to Donaldson, that but "few farms will afford the generally allowed increase of three rents; one for the landlord, one for charges, and the third for the tenant. A farm of 100 acres, let at £1 per acre, may be maintained for the charge of £100 yearly; but if let for £50 a year the charges will be more than double the rent; or there must be the quantity of 200 acres of land in the farm".

== Legacy ==
The British The Complete Farmer: Or, a General Dictionary of Husbandry by members of the Royal Society, first published from 1756 to 1768, considered John Mortimer among the foremost agriculturists of that time. The 3rd edition of The Complete Farmer (1777) even listed Mortimer in the subtitle of this work among other foremost authorities, such as Carl Linnaeus, Louis François Henri de Menon, Hugh Plat, John Evelyn, John Worlidge, Jethro Tull, William Ellis, Philip Miller, Thomas Hale, Edward Lisle, Roque, John Mills, and Arthur Young.

By the end of the 18th century Mortimer authority faded. The 3rd edition (1777) of The Complete Farmer still mentioned Mortimer as reference over 50 times, but in 4th edition (1793) just over a dozen times. In his 1825 An encyclopædia of agriculture, John Claudius Loudon confirmed Mortimer's authority in the 18th century, stating:

"In England, from the restoration to the middle of the eighteenth century, very little improvement took place, either in the cultivation of the soil, or in the management of live stock. Even clover and turnips (the great support of the present improved system of agriculture) were confined to a few districts, and at the close of this period were scarcely cultivated at all by common farmers in the northern parts of the island. From the Whole Art of Husbandry, published by Mortimer in 1706, a work of considerable merit, it does not appear that any improvement was made on his practices till near the end of last century. In those districts where clover and rye-grass were cultivated, they were cut green, and used for soiling as at present. Turnips were sown broadcast, hand hoed, and used for feeding sheep and cattle, as they were used in Houghton's time, and are still in most districts of England.

Donaldson in his 1854 Agricultural Biography, credited both Mortimer and John Mills for being the first authors, who wrote on agriculture, presenting all the branches of the art within the compass of one work. John Mills succeeded, according to Donaldson, while "Worlidge began the attempt, but failed in the comprehension required."

== Selected publications ==
- John Mortimer. Some Considerations concerning the present State of Religion, with some Essays towards our Love and Union, London, 1702.
- John Mortimer. Advice to Parents, or Rules for the Education of Children, London, 1704.
- John Mortimer. The whole Art of Husbandry, in the way of Managing and Improving of Land. London, 1707.
