= The Complete Farmer: Or, a General Dictionary of Husbandry =

18th-century English-language encyclopaedia

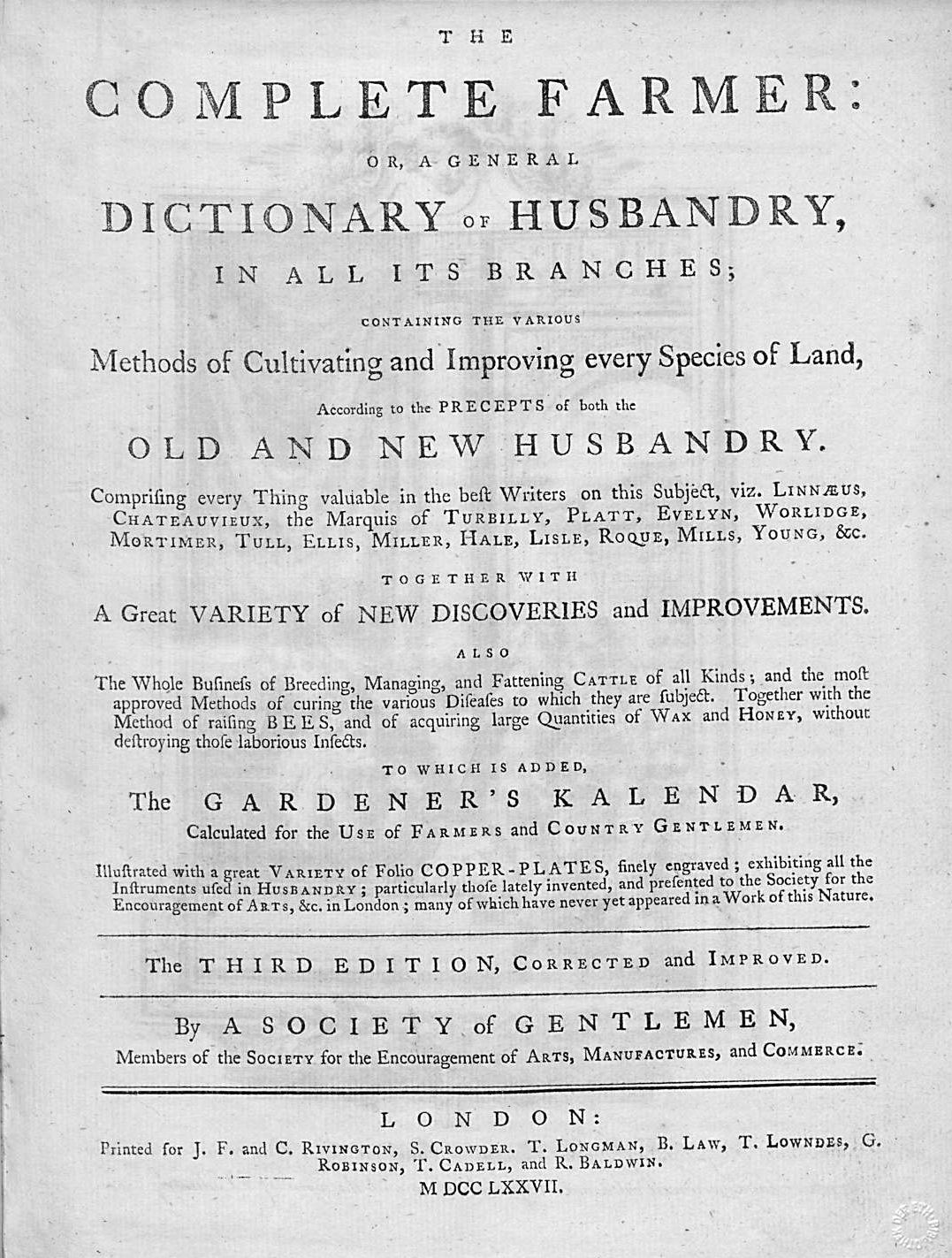
- Title page of third ed. 1777.
- Author: A Society of Gentlemen, a group of members of the Royal Society of Arts
- Language: English
- Genre: Reference encyclopaedia
- Published: London : printed for J. F. and C. Rivington [etc.], 1777
- Publication place: England
- Pages: First ed. in weekly numbers, 1768; Second ed. 1768. 670-page. Third ed. 1777, 887 pages 4th ed. 1793. 5th ed. in 2 vols, 1807.
- LC Class: 36036354

The Complete Farmer: Or, a General Dictionary of Husbandry is an 18th-century English-language encyclopaedia, holding a summary of information on agriculture and in all its branches. It was written by members of the Royal Society of Arts under the pseudonym a Society of Gentlemen, and first issued in 1756 and published in weekly numbers until 1768.

== Overview ==
The Complete Farmer: Or, a General Dictionary of Husbandry is an 18th-century dictionary, which dealt with all branches of agriculture. It contained various contemporary methods of cultivating and improving land; of breeding, managing, and fattening cattle; of curing the various diseases etc. The whole was ranged in alphabetical order, and every thing, relating to the fame subject was contained in one article. It was supplemented with a Gardener's Kalendar for the use of farmers and others, which contained accounts of the work necessary to be done every month in the year, and accounts for the nursery and kitchen gardens.

The Complete Farmer was written by anonymous writers, which used the pseudonym a "Society of Gentlemen," only revealing that they were members of the Society for the Encouragement of Arts, the later Royal Society of Arts. The content was based on the insides of the foremost authorities, which were listed as "Carl Linnaeus, Michel Lullin de Chateauvieux, Marquis de Turbilly, Hugh Plat, John Evelyn, John Worlidge, John Mortimer, Jethro Tull, Ellis, Philip Miller, Thomas Hale, Edward Lisle, Roque, John Mills, Arthur Young." This work was first issued in 1756, and published in weekly numbers until 1768. The second enlarged and improved edition of the work was published shortly after the weekly publishing of the first edition was finished, in order to supply the demands of the public. The third edition was published in 1777, the fourth in 1793, and the last fifth edition in two volumes in 1807.

According to Fussell (1930) The Complete Farmer was one of seven similar dictionaries published during the 18th century, of which the Dictionarium rusticum, urbanicum & botanicum, published in 1726, was the first. These dictionaries were the first of their kind in British history, only proceeded by the 17th-century Dictionarium Rusticum, which was published as supplement to Worlidge's Systema Agriculturae in 1669. There general works were intended to assist in the management of estates. Other 18th-century general works of this kind, were Hall's A Compleat Body of Husbandry, Lisle's Observations in Husbandry, Mill's A New System of Practical Husbandry, and Jethro Tull's Horse-Hoeing Husbandry.

== Topics of The Complete Farmer ==
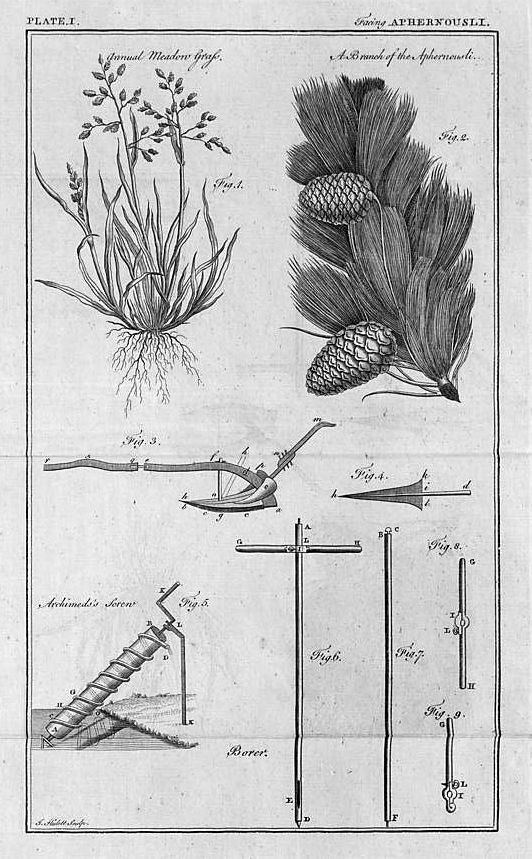
The Complete Farmer, plate I

=== Husbandry ===
The preface of The Complete Farmer commands husbandry ahead of all human arts, which had "its birth with the world". It starts with:

HUSBANDRY is, with great justice, placed at the head of human arts, as having a very great advantage over all others, both with regard to antiquity and usefulness. It had its birth with the world, and has always been the genuine source of solid wealth, and real treasures; for it will furnish a people with everything necessary to render life happy and desirable, form the principal revenues of the state, and even supply the defect of all others, when they happen to fail.

A definition of husbandry can be found in the lemma on husbandry, which also appeared in Temple Henry Croker et al. (1764) The complete dictionary of arts and sciences,:

HUSBANDRY, the business or employment of a farmer, or person who cultivates land, Bzc.
Husbandry is divided into two kinds, and distinguished by the old and new. early times; and the latter that introduced by the ingenious Mr. Tull, and often called the horse-hoeing husbandry....

The lemma on husbandry continues with a section on preparing the ground and the need of plowing, which also appeared in John Mills (1763) A New and Complete System of Practical Husbandry, stating:

... Experience shews, that land, though ever so well tilled in the autumn, when wheat for example, is sown, hardens and soddens in the winter; its particles, beaten down by heavy rains, and funk by their own own weight, approach each other daily more and more; the roots of the plants cultivated have consequently less and less room to extend themselves in quest of their necessary food; and the interstices in the earth become of course so few and close, that they are not able to pierce through them; whilst weeds spring up, and rob them of their nourishment. By this means the earth, reduced to nearly the fame condition as if it had not been ploughed at all, is unable to assist the plants sown in it in the spring, when they ought to shoot with the greatest vigour. They consequently then stand most of all in need of the plough, to destroy the weeds, to lay fresh earth to their roots in the room of that earth which they have exhausted, to break the particles of the ground anew, so as to enable their roots to spread, in order to their gathering an ample provision of food, which then does them the greatest service.

The lemma continues over more than 100 paragraphs, extensively citing from multiple sources, presenting several systems of crop rotation, and other accounts. According to Smollett (1768) the whole article on husbandry gave a "very full and accurate comparison..., from a variety of authors, between the profits arising from the different methods of cultivation, according to the precepts of the old and new husbandry."

=== On the history of agricultural science ===
The lemma on "Agriculture" gave an account on the origin and historical development of agriculture and agricultural writings. The origin of this art and science is synchronized with the Bible, and reads:

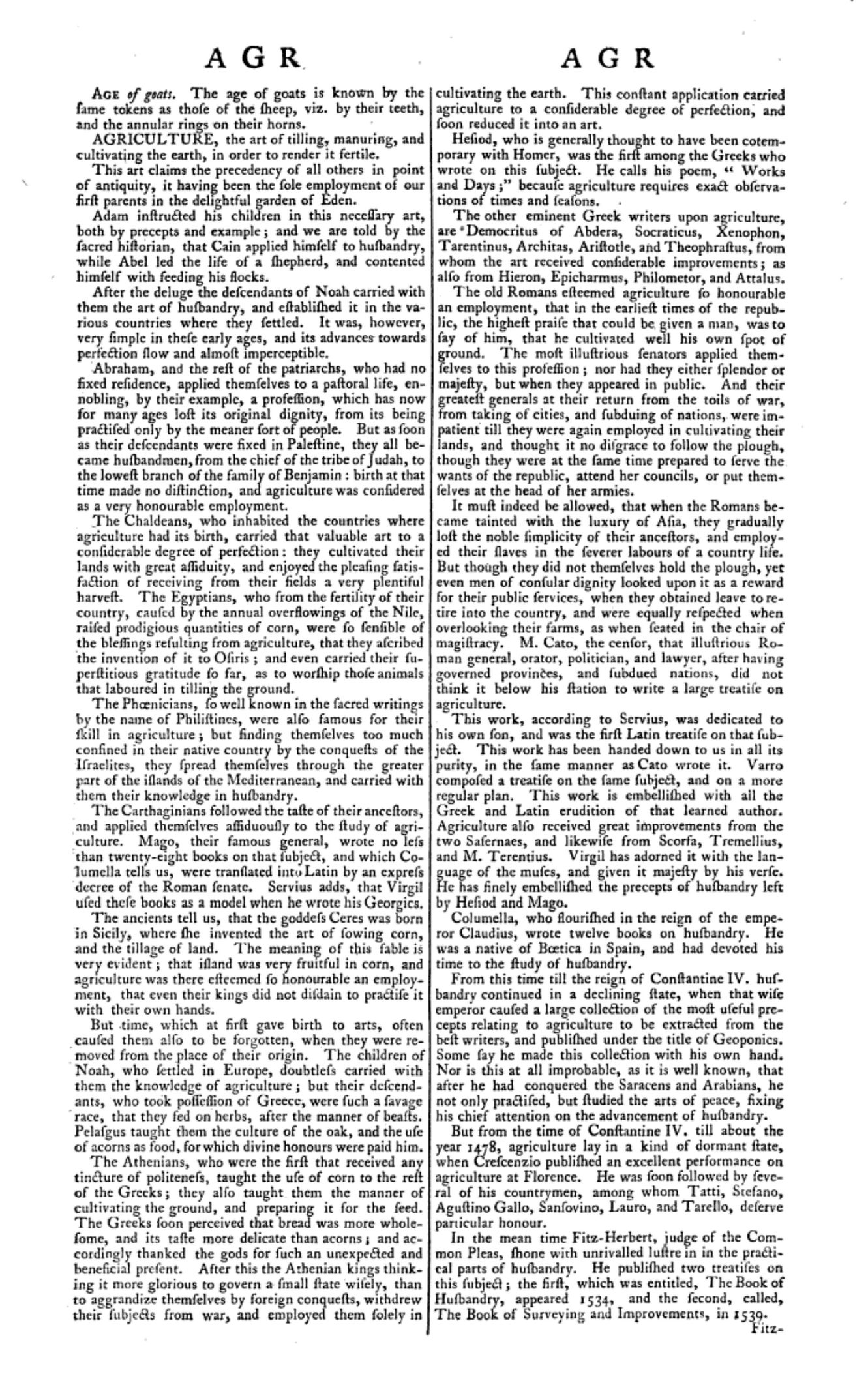
The complete Farmer, page AGR

This art claims the precedency of all others in point of antiquity, it having been the sole employment of our first parents in the delightful garden of Eden.
Adam instructed his children in this necessary art, both by precepts and example; and we are told by the sacred historian, that Cain applied himself to husbandry, while Abel led the life of a shepherd, and contented himself with feeding his flocks.
After the deluge the descendants of Noah carried with them the art of husbandry, and established it in the various countries where they settled. It was, however, very simple in these early ages, and its advances towards perfection slow and almost imperceptible.
Abraham, and the rest of the patriarchs, who had no fixed residence, applied themselves to a pastoral life, ennobling, by their example, a profession, which has now for many ages lost its original dignity, from its being practised only by the meaner sort of people. But as soon as their descendants were fixed in Palestine, they all became husbandmen, from the chief of the tribe of Judah, to the lowest branch of the family of Benjamin : birth at that time made no distinction, and agriculture was considered as a very honourable employment.

About the agriculture and agricultural writings in Ancient Greece it summarized:

The Athenians, who were the first that received any tincture of politeness, taught the use of corn to the rest of the Greeks they also taught them the manner of cultivating the ground, and preparing it for the seed. The Greeks soon perceived that bread was more wholesome, and its taste more delicate than acorns and accordingly thanked the gods for such an unexpected and beneficial present. After this the Athenian kings thinking it more glorious to govern a small state wisely, than to aggrandize themselves by foreign conquests, withdrew their subjects from war, and employed them solely in; cultivating the earth. This constant application carried agriculture to a considerable degree of perfection, and soon reduced it into an art.
Hesiod, who is generally thought to have been contemporary with Homer, was the first among the Greeks who wrote on this subject. He calls his poem, " Works and Days;" because agriculture requires exact observations of times and seasons.
The other eminent Greek writers upon agriculture, are Democritus of Abdera, Socraticus, Xenophon, Tarentinus, Architas, Aristotle, and Theophrastus, from whom the art received considerable improvements; as also from Hieron, Epicharmus, Philomctor, and Attalus.

Via the old Romans and its decline in the Middle Ages, agriculture arose from its dormant state in the Renaissance, "when Crescenzio published an excellent performance on agriculture at Florence. He was soon followed by several of his countrymen, among whom Tatti, Stefano, Agustino Gallo, Sansovino, Lauro, and Tarello, deserve particular honour." This further evolved in Britain, The Flemings, France, Ireland etc. until its state of that time.

== Reception ==
One of the first reviews of this work by Tobias George Smollett (1768) gave the following summary of the specific topics of The Complete Farmer:

The whole is ranged in alphabetical order, and every thing, relating to the fame subject is contained in one article. Thus the reader will find under the articles Wheat, Barley, Rye, Pease, Beans, Turnips, etc. the whole method of cultivation, and the various improvements that have been made with regard to each respectively. Under the article Husbandry, a very full and accurate comparison is given, from a variety of authors, between the profits arising from the different methods of cultivation, according to the precepts of the old and new husbandry. Nor is this treatise confined to the different species of grain and vegetables cultivated in almost every part of the kingdom – those that are more uncommon, and confined as it were to particular districts, are also considered in a very full and ample manner; such as Hemp, Flax, Hops, Madder, Maize, Potatoes, Saffron, Teazle, or Fuller's Thistle, Weld, or Dyer's Weed, etc.

And also:

We have also here accounts of the advantages of cultivating Bore-cole, Cabbages, Carrots, Parsnips, etc. for feeding cattle together with the best methods of cultivation. The new species of grass in that time introduced are here described, and the best methods of cultivating them fully explained; such as Bird-grass, Black-grass, Timothy-grass, etc. Under the articles Farm, Common, Hay, Inclosing, Mowing, Ploughing, Seed, Sowing, Threshing, etc. the reader will find very useful instructions and observations, many of which are perhaps no where else to be found. Besides the common machines used in the practice of husbandry, we have here ample descriptions and accurate drawings of Mr. Hewitt's new Horse-hoe, Mr. Comber's Cutting-box, Mr. Clarke's Draining-plough, Mr. Ogden's Fallow-cleansing Machine, Mr. Randall's Spiky Roller, etc. etc. Under the article Bee, the authors have given a very full account of that laborious and useful insect, together with all the improvements that have been made with regard to the management of Bees, and the methods of taking the wax and honey without destroying them, according to the practice off White; Thorley, and Wildman.

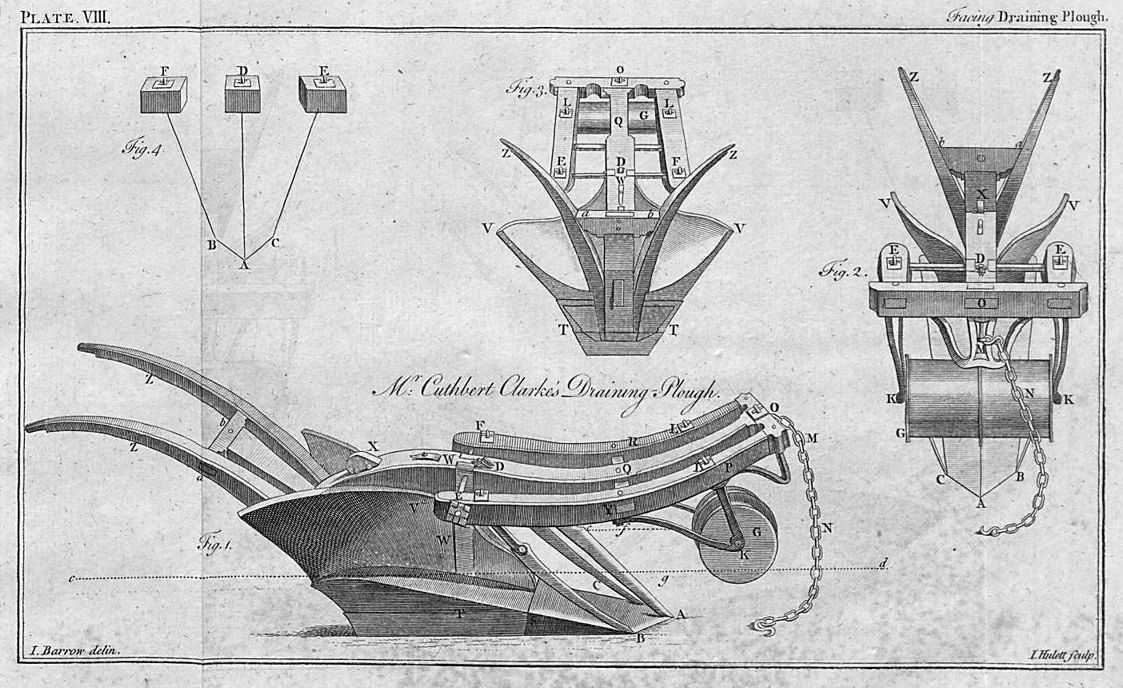
Plate VIII: Mr. Clarke's Draining-plough

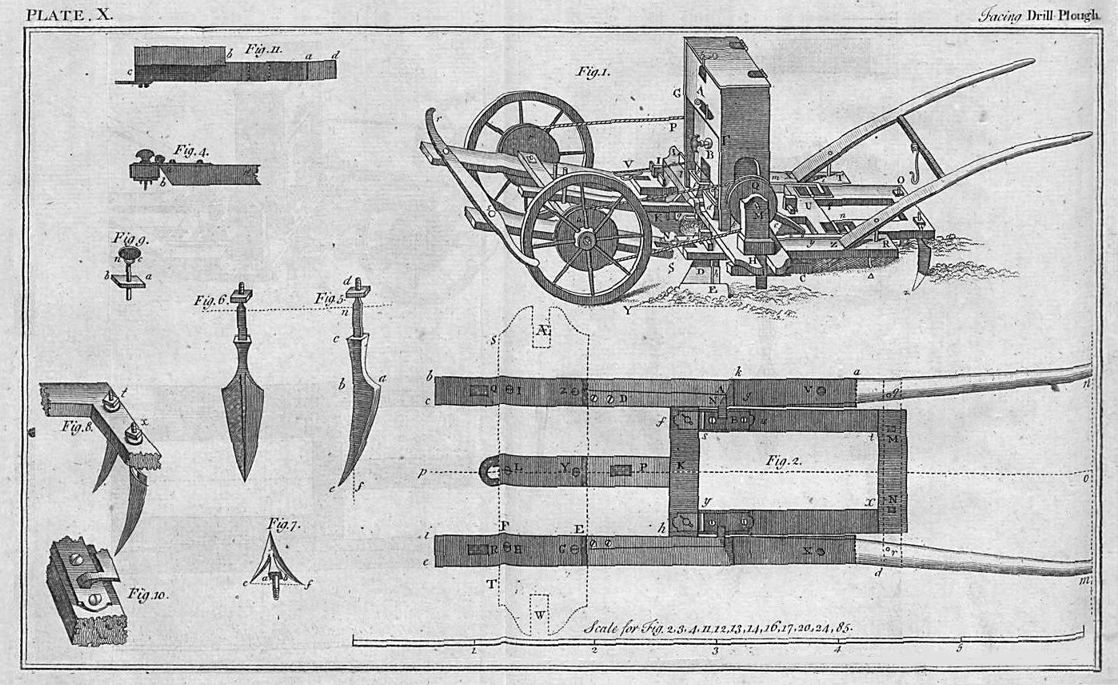
Plate X: Facing Drill Plough

Nor is the theory of agriculture wholly omitted : the book is indeed chiefly intended to facilitate the practice of husbandry, and introduce the various improvements that have been lately made in that useful and necessary art; but it should at the fame time be remembered, that every method of practice is founded on reason or theory; arid accordingly the authors have explained, under the articles Air, Atmosphere, Food of Plants, Husbandry, Leaves, Sap, Vegetation, Water, etc. the operations of nature, and laid down a theory, which cannot fail of being agreeable to the curious reader.

Smollett (1768) ended his review with the words:

We had almost forgot to mention, that under the article Surveying, the authors have given a compendious treatise of that useful art, in so plain and easy a manner that any person of a very moderate capacity, though a stranger to the method of measuring land, may soon be able to survey, plan, and protract any farm or parcel of land, without any other assistance. From the above account of this work, the reader will be able to form some idea of its use, at a time when the study of agriculture is pursued with great assiduity in every part of Europe.

In those days The Complete Farmer was widely read, and was used as reference up until the early 19th century. For example, Samuel Deane's The New-England Farmer from 1822 used about a dozen citations from that work. In the preface of the first edition of The Encyclopedia of Agriculture, John Claudius Loudon (1825) ranked The Complete Farmer among the foremost publications on rural matters of the early 19th century. According to Loudon:

The subject of Agriculture admits of two grand divisions; the improvement and general management of landed property, which may be termed Territorial Economy; and the cultivation and treatment of its more useful animal and vegetable productions, which is called Husbandry, or Agriculture in a more limited sense of the term."

The Complete Farmer embraced both of these departments. Loudon describes this work as "copious to an excess, containing an immense mass of matter, new and old, good and bad." He is however clear in his judgement "As a dictionary of Husbandry, it was the best of its kind at the time of its publication: but the rapid progress of Agriculture since its date, renders it at the present time quite an obsolete work."
