= Jean-Baptiste Louis Crévier =

French historian and writer (1693–1765)

Jean-Baptiste Louis Crévier (1693–1765) was a French writer. He was born in Paris, where his father was a printer.

He studied under Rollin, and held the professorship of rhetoric in the college of Beauvais for twenty years. He completed Rollin's Histoire romaine by the addition of six volumes (1750–1756); he also published two editions of Livy, with notes; L'Histoire des empereurs des Romains, jusqu'à Constantin (1749); Histoire de l'Université de Paris, and a Rhétorique française, which enjoyed much popularity.
