= John Donaldson (agriculturalist) =

Scottish agriculturalist (1799–1876)

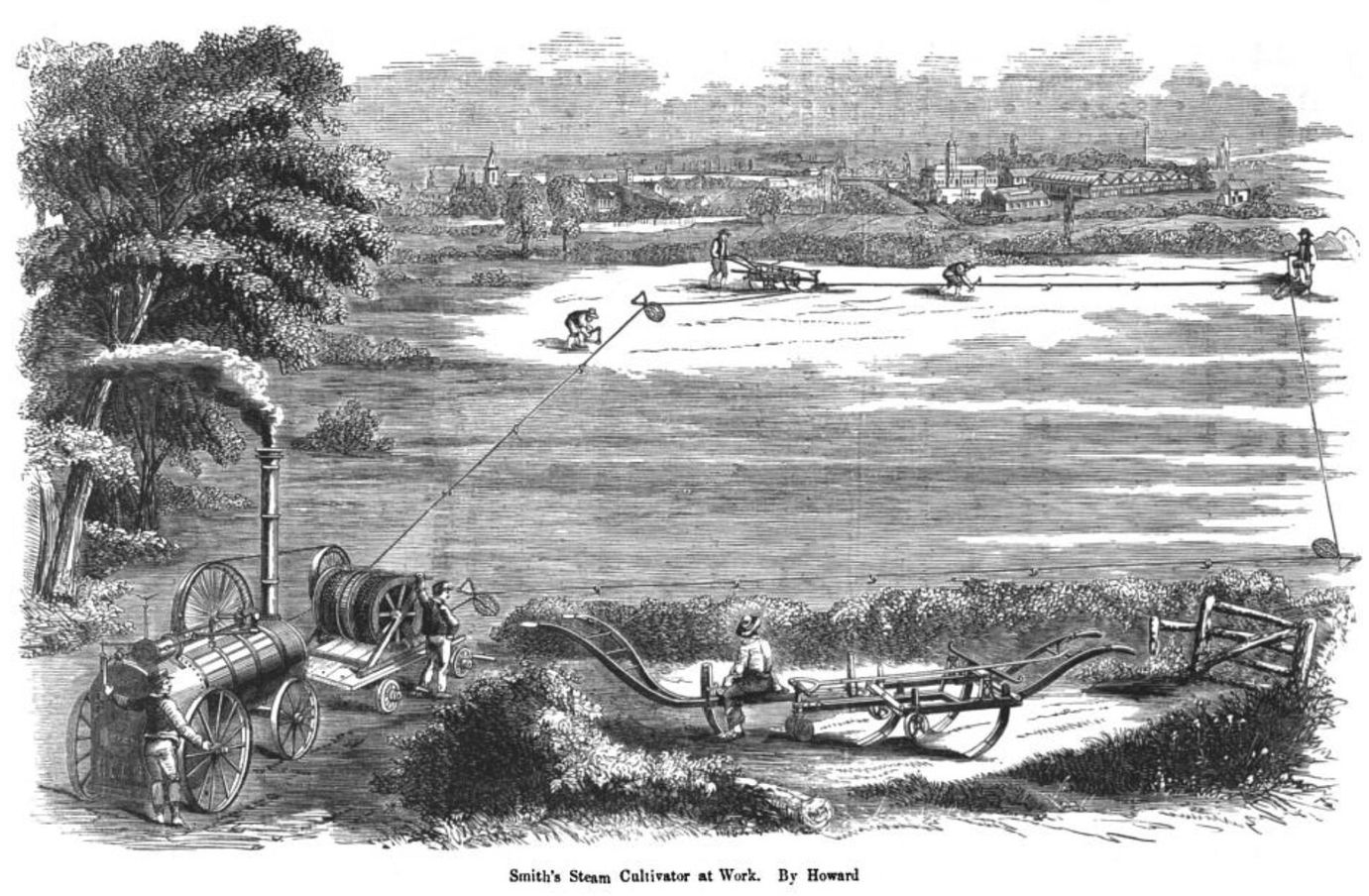
Smith's Steam Cultivator at Work, from Donaldson's British agriculture, 1860.

John Donaldson (1799–1876) was a Scottish agriculturalist, professor of Botany at the Royal Agricultural Training School, Hoddesdon, government land drainage surveyor, and author of prize essays works, best known as author of the 1854 Agricultural Biography.

== Biography ==
Donaldson was born in Northumberland in 1799. He was probably related to James Donaldson (fl. 1794), writer on agriculture and land surveyor from Dundee, whose subjects he made his own.

In his early years in the 1820s Donalson had the management of large farms, and extensive estates, such as those of Loudon Castle in Ayrshire, and Donnington Park in Leicestershire, both in Scotland and England. In the 1840s Donaldson was appointed Head of Agricultural School at Hoddesdon, which at that time had just been established. In the title pages of his chief writings, Donaldson is described as "Professor of Botany" and "Government Land Drainage Survey." He was elected Fellows of the Society of Antiquaries of London.

Donaldson was presented to the Charterhouse by the Prince Consort in August 1855, and died a poor brother there on 22 March 1876, leaving a will in favour of Elizabeth Saine, a widow. In the year after his death a posthumous work on 'Suburban Farming' was edited by Robert Scott Burn.

== Work ==
Donaldson is described by Fussell (1983) as "another of these Victorian goliaths whose output was large, and... was intimate with the writings of all his bucolic and farming literary ancestors."

His chief writings Agricultural Biography, (1854) : contains a chronological series of articles on the life and writings of the British authors on agriculture, from the earliest date in 1480 until the mid 19th century. It was considered a very useful specimen of biographical grouping, though the notices are often merely bibliographical.

His 1860 British Agriculture : Cultivation of Land, Management of Crops, Economy of Animals, is an elaborate compilation dedicated to the Duke of Argyll.

== Selected publications ==
- J. S. Bayldon, John Donaldson. Bayldon's art of valuing rents and tillages 5th edition, enlarged and rewritten by Donaldson, 1840.
- John Donaldson. A Treatise on Manures, 1842.
- John Donaldson. The Enemies to Agriculture, Botanical and Zoological: Being A Brief Account Of The Weeds, Quadrupeds, Birds, Insects, And Worms ... 1847.
- John Donaldson. Soils and Manures, 1851.
- John Donaldson. Improved farm buildings: comprising a series of designs of buildings, adapted to various sized farms, having especial reference to the recent scientific practice in agriculture M. Taylor, 1851.
- John Donaldson. Rudimentary treatise on clay lands and loamy soils, 1852
- Edward Ryde, John Donaldson. A general text book for the constant use and reference of architects, engineers, surveyors, solicitors, auctioneers, land agents, and stewards ... J. Weale, 1854
- John Donaldson. Agricultural Biography: containing a notice of the life and writings of the British authors on agriculture, from the earliest date in 1480 to the present time, 1854
- John Donaldson. British Agriculture : Cultivation of Land, Management of Crops, Economy of Animals, 1860
- John Donaldson, Robert Scott Burn. Suburban farming. With additions by R.S. Burn. 1877
