= John Worlidge =

English agriculturalist

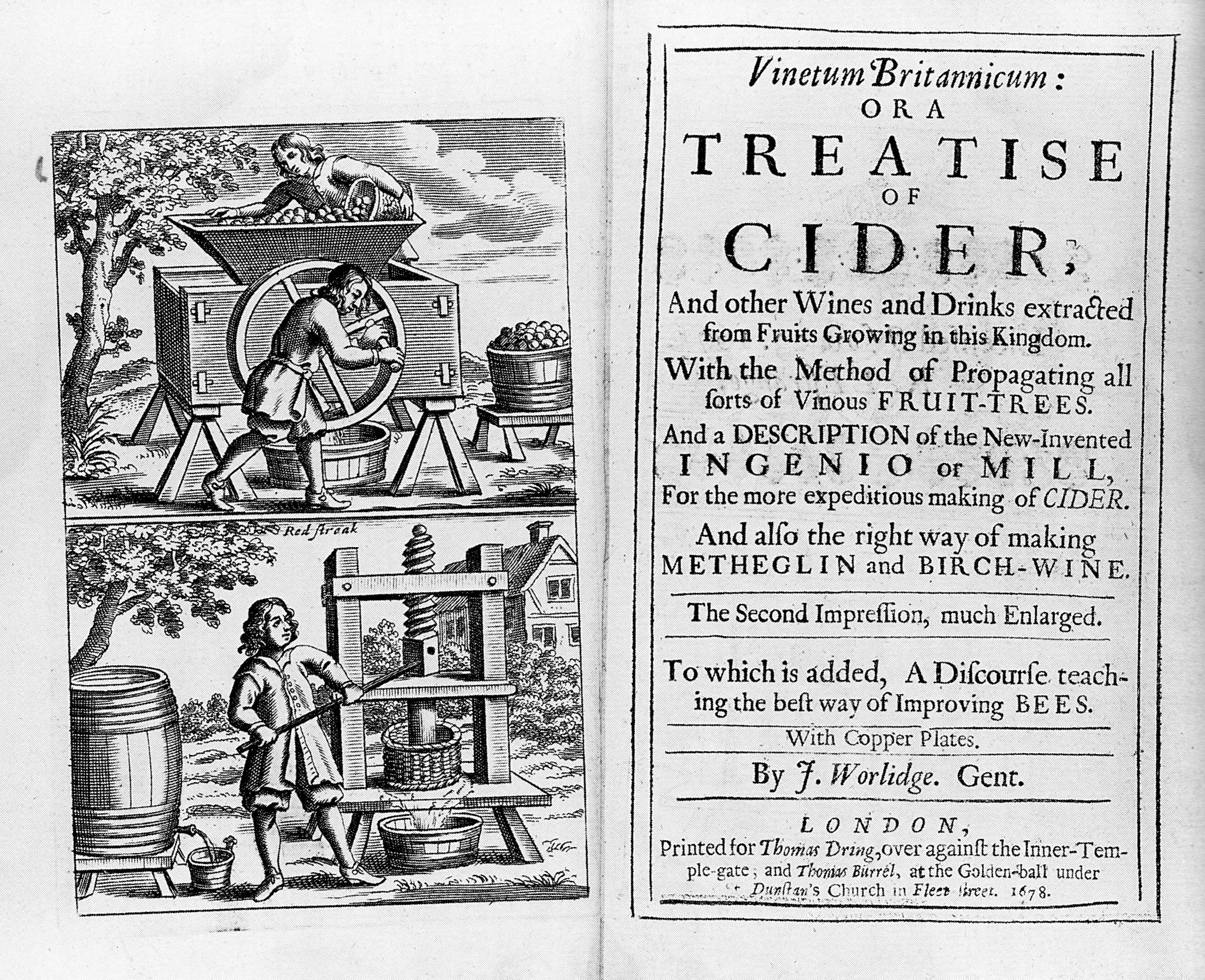
Vinetum Britannicum, 1678

John Worlidge or John Woolridge (1640–1700) was an English agriculturalist, who lived in Petersfield, Hampshire, England. He was considered a great expert on rural affairs, and one of the first British agriculturalists to discuss the importance of farming as an industry.

== Life ==
John Worlidge was the eldest son (of ten children) born to John Worlidge, a Petersfield lawyer, and Anne Yalden. Anne, in turn, was the youngest daughter of William and Rose Yalden. William Yalden (d. 1644) was an estate manager at Petersfield, while Rose (d. 1652) was the older sister of the botanist John Goodyer (1592–1664).

== Works ==
=== Systema Agriculturæ (1668) ===
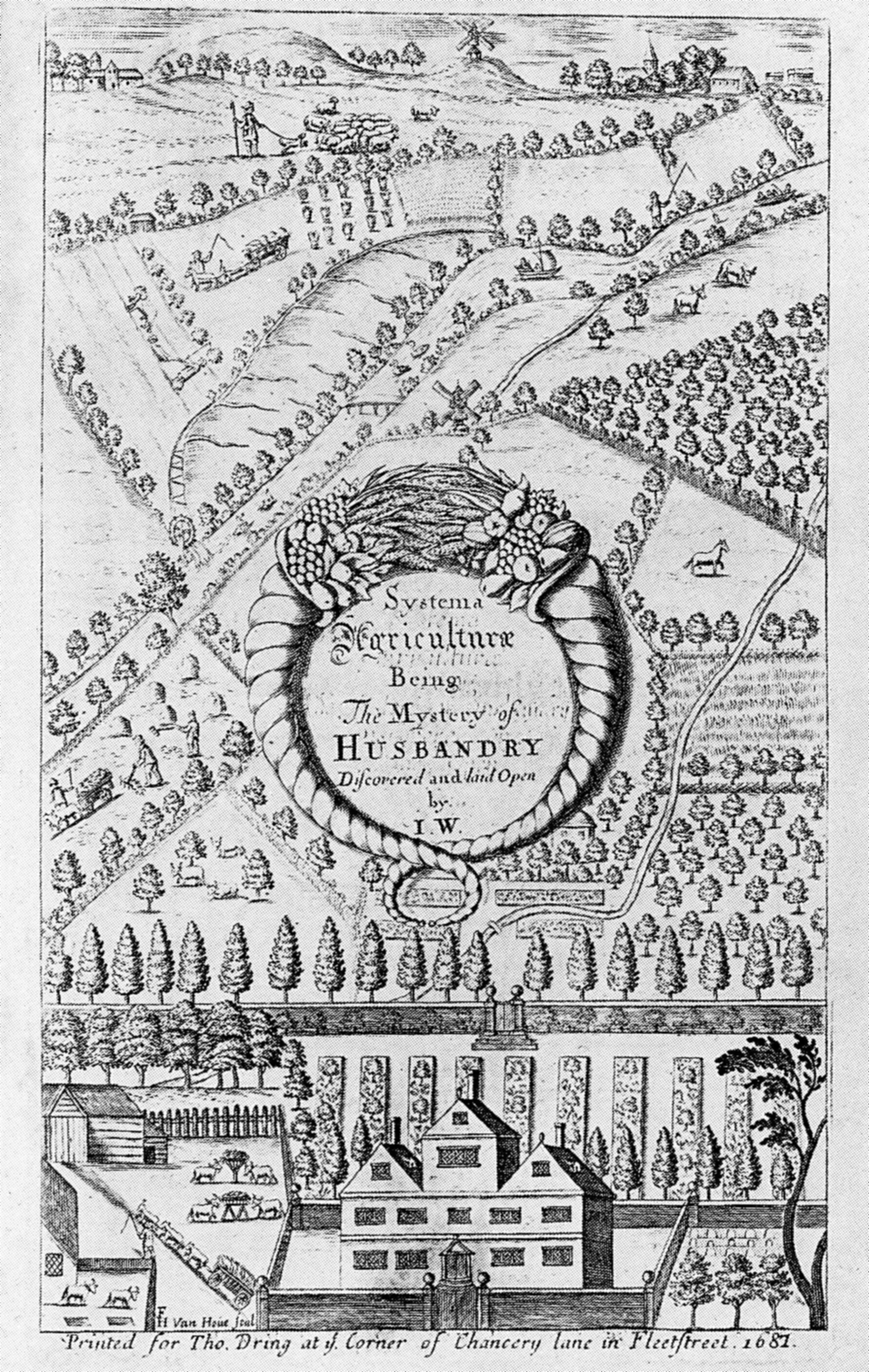
Systema agriculturae, title plate 1668.

Worlidge's Systema Agriculturæ, or the Mystery of Husbandry discovered ... by J. W., Gent., was first published in 1668. Worlidge appears to have carefully studied the writings of his predecessors, Anthony Fitzherbert, Sir Richard Weston, Robert Child, Walter Blith, Gabriel Plattes, Sir Hugh Plat, and the anonymous writers whose works were published by Samuel Hartlib.

This work treats of improvements in general, of enclosing meadows and pastures, and of watering and draining them, of clovers, vetches, spurry, Wiltshire long-grass (probably that of the meadows of Salisbury), hemp, flax, rape, turnips, &c A Persian wheel was made by his direction in Wiltshire, in 1665, that carried water in good quantity above twenty feet high, for watering meadows, and another near Godalming in Surrey. Sowing clover and other seeds preserved the cattle in the fatal winter of 1673, in the southern parts of England; whereas in the western and northern, through defect of hay and pasture, the greater part of their cattle perished. Hops enough were not planted, but we imported them from the Netherlands of a quality not so good as our own. The authors he chiefly quotes are Weston, Hartlib, and Blith.

Worlidge's system of husbandry collected information published during the period of the Commonwealth. The work went through a number of editions (1675, 1681, 1687, 1716) before it was supplanted by the agricultural reference books of the eighteenth century.

=== Other works ===
In his notable 1676 book, Vinetum britannicum, Worlidge advocated the production of cider over that of wine in Great Britain because it was better suited to the climate and resources.

Beside Systema Agriculturae (1669) on husbandry, and Vinetum Brittannicum on wine, Worlidge wrote Systema Horticulturae (1677) on gardening.

== Selected publications ==
Worlidge wrote mostly under the initials of J. W., Gent. the following books:

- John Worlidge (1668). Systema Agriculturæ, or the Mystery of Husbandry discovered ... by J. W., Gent. Other editions in 1675, 1681, 1687, 1716.
- John Worlidge (1676). Vinetum Britannicum, or a Treatise of Cider, 1676; 2nd edit. 1678; 3rd edit. 1691, dedicated to Elias Ashmole
- John Worlidge (1676). Apiarium, or a Discourse of Bees,
- John Worlidge (1677). Systema Horticulture, or the Art of Gardening, 1677.
- John Worlidge (1687). The most easie Method of Making the best Cyder,
- John Worlidge (1698). The Complete Bee Master, a revised edition of the 1776. Apiarium, or a Discourse of Bees,
- Nathan Bailey, John Worlidge (1704). Dictionarium Rusticum & Urbanicum: or, A Dictionary of all Sorts of Country Affairs, Handicraft, Trading, and Merchandizing. 1st edition. London: J. Nicholson.
- Nathan Bailey, John Worlidge (1717). Dictionarium Rusticum, Urbanicum & Botanicum: or, A Dictionary of Husbandry, Gardening, Trade, Commerce, and all Sorts of Country-Affairs. 2nd edition. London: J. Nicholson; W. Taylor; and W. Churchill.
- Nathan Bailey, John Worlidge (1726). Dictionarium Rusticum, Urbanicum & Botanicum: or, A Dictionary of Husbandry, Gardening, Trade, Commerce, and all Sorts of Country-Affairs. 3rd edition. London: J. and J. Knapton; A. Bettesworth; and others. Two volumes.
- John Worlidge (1716). A Compleat System of Husbandry and Gardening: Or, the Gentleman's Companion, in the Business and Pleasures of a Country Life. ... The Whole Collected From, and Containing what is Most Valuable in All the Books Hitherto Written Upon this Subject, J. Pickard, A. Bettesworth, and E. Curll, 1716

== Bibliography ==
- "ChaseGray Family Trees". 2016.

Attribution

This article incorporates text from a publication now in the public domain: "Worlidge, John". Dictionary of National Biography. London: Smith, Elder & Co. 1885–1900.
