= Marie Curie's Blooming Great Tea Party =

Marie Curie charity fundraiser

The Blooming Great Tea Party was started in 2008 by the Marie Curie charity. It's the charity's second biggest annual fundraising campaign, only beaten by its Great Daffodil Appeal.

The Blooming Great Tea Party takes place every year in the spring or summer. Members of the public host a tea party in their house, garden, or other suitable location. Based on the tea parties of Victorian and Edwardian Britain, hosts prepare classic tea accompaniments like cucumber or tomatoes sandwiches, cake slices, biscuits and scones. Marie Curie also prepares and distributes other recipes.

== History ==
The first Blooming Great Tea Party was held in 2008. Unusually, instead of beginning in a single location, parties happened across the community fundraising areas of Marie Curie. Over the years, tea parties have spread to even more areas across the UK, with around 5,000 parties hosted annually.

== Key facts ==
For 2015, Marie Curie is hoping that 6,000 parties will be hosted and, since the parties began in 2008, they have raised over £4 million for the charity.

Many celebrities have supported the event, and for 2015 the campaign is being supported by Mel Giedroyc, just as it was in 2014.

== Notable Blooming Great Tea Parties ==
On 25 May 2011 at the Park Club, Acton held an underwater Blooming Great Tea Party. The large pool that held the party was attended by a number of celebrity guests. Diners included Louis Theroux, Adrian Chiles, Zoë Tyler, Nina Wadia and Aaron Renfree. They were joined by over 80 guests in ‘Mad Hatter’ fancy dress. Rebecca Adlington opened the event, which featured a special menu prepared for the unique surroundings of caramelized cucumber sandwiches, ice cubed fairy cake, and English breakfast tea-flavoured gel.

The cast of Downton Abbey has also taken part in the campaign. On 29 May 2012, stars such as Cara Theobold and Matt Milne held a party on the set. Jim Carter, played by Butler Charles Carson said "What could be more Downton Abbey than a good British tea party? We rather enjoyed having a break from serving the Earl and Countess of Grantham!"

== Celebrity supporters ==
- Mel Giedroyc, English presenter, actress and comedian
- Louis Theroux, British documentary filmmaker and broadcaster
- Adrian Chiles, British television and radio presenter
- Zoë Tyler, English voice coach, cruise ship singer, performer and reality television show judge
- Nina Wadia, Indian-born British actress, best known for playing Zainab Masood in the BBC soap opera EastEnders.
- Aaron Renfree, oldest member of S Club 8
- Rebecca Adlington, retired English freestyle swimmer
- Cara Theobold, English actress
- Matt Milne, English actor
- Jane Asher, English actress
- The Saturdays, English - Irish girl group
- Jane Horrocks, English stage, screen and television actress, voice artist, musician and singer.
- Victoria Wood, English comedian, actor, singer-songwriter, screenwriter and director
- Downton Abbey, British period drama television series
- James Martin, British celebrity chef
- Gordon Ramsay, British celebrity chef
- Ainsley Harriott, British celebrity chef
