= Magdalenengarten =

Baroque park in Hildesheim, Lower Saxony, Germany

Coordinates: 52°09′09″N 9°56′28″E

Magdalenengarten is a baroque park in Hildesheim in Lower Saxony, Germany.

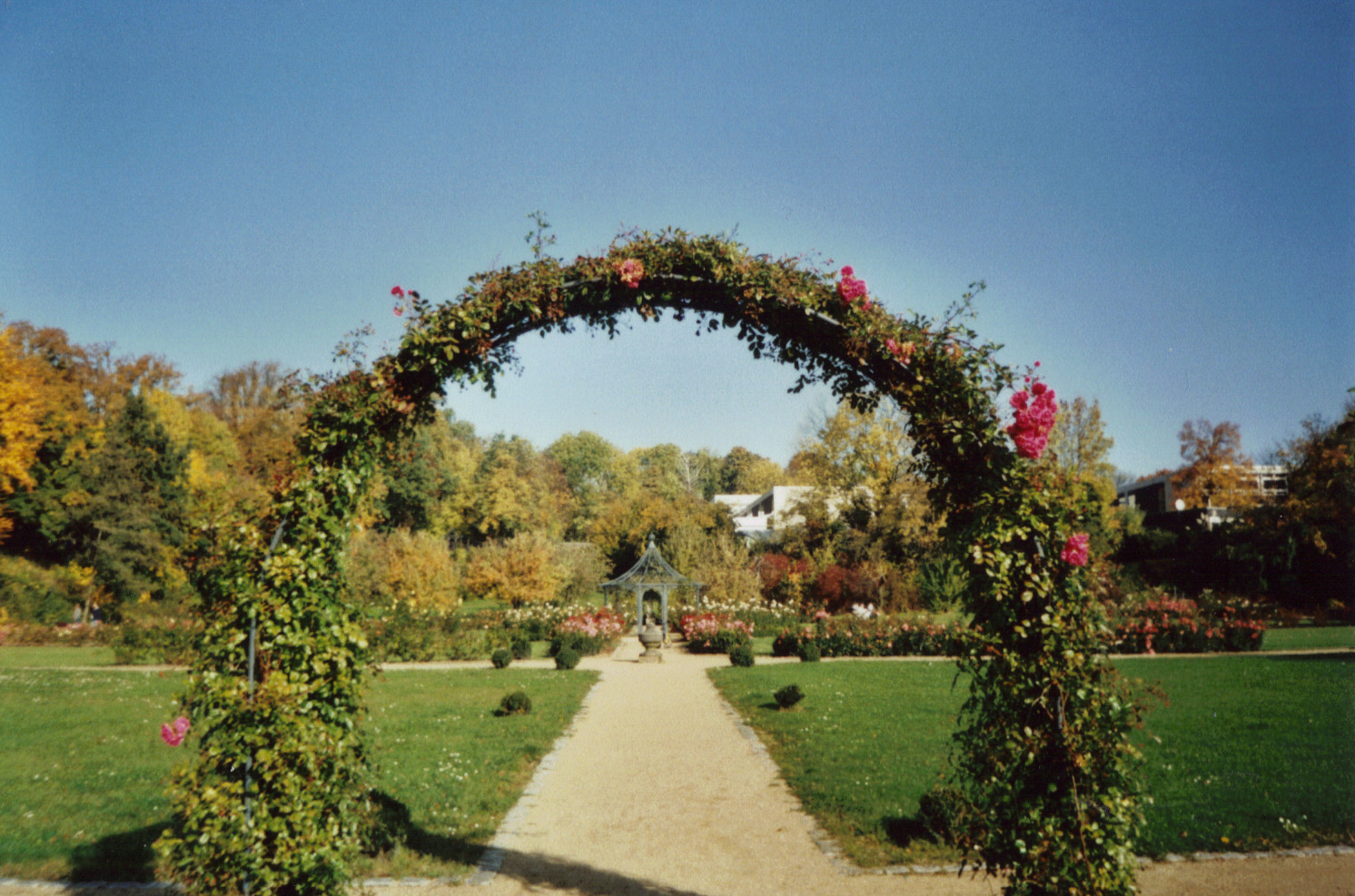
General view

== Location and size ==
Magdalenengarten is in the western part of the historic city center of Hildesheim. On the west side a well-preserved part of the medieval moat and rampart can be seen. On the east side the garden joins the Michaelisplatz and St. Michael's Church, one of the most famous sights of Hildesheim which is a World Cultural Heritage. St. Magdalena's Church, another sightworthy church is close by as well. The garden covers an area of about six acres.

== History ==
Magdalenengarten is one of the oldest historic parks in Lower Saxony. Originally, the area was used by the nuns of a nearby monastery (Magdalenenkloster), which had been founded in 1224, to grow medicinal herbs and vegetables. The name refers to the monastery and its church, Saint Magdalena's Church which is in the south of the park. A small hill in the north of the herb garden was used as a vineyard.

In 1720–25 the monastery garden was enlarged and transformed into an ornamental Baroque garden with a regular network of footpaths. In 1810 the monastery was dissolved during the secularization and transformed into a lunatic asylum in 1827. The garden grew wild and was closed to the public. On 22 March 1945 the Magdalenengarten was devastated by bombs during an air raid. The former monastery was destroyed, rebuilt in 1952 and used as a home for the aged afterwards.

When the home for the aged did not need the garden any longer it was restored in the original Baroque style of the early 18th century. Restoration works using old paintings and maps started in 2003. More than 1,500 roses were planted. The original system of footpaths as straight as a die was found well-preserved under the sod. On the former vineyard 198 vines were planted. The restoration of Magdalenengarten as a baroque park was completed in summer of 2004.

== Sights and attractions ==
Magdalenengarten mainly consists of eight squares four of which form a rosarium with 1,500 roses and a pavilion of climbing roses. One square is covered by a herb garden. There are more than 100 different kinds of trees and bushes in the park.

The main path with a length of 110 metres divides the park into an eastern and a western section. A very rare species of wild yellow tulips (tulipa sylvestris) which normally do not occur in central and northern Europe can be seen blossoming in the western section in April. Possibly the first of them were planted in Magdalenengarten in the 18th century as this Italian kind of tulips was very popular during the baroque period. Michaelisblick is a viewpoint in the western section offering a scenic view of the park, of St. Michael's Church and of the impressive belfry of St. Andrew's Church. A baroque statue of Ceres, the Roman goddess of agriculture, with a putto dating from around 1720 can be seen in the western section as well.

There is a long and well-preserved part of the medieval city wall in the eastern section of the park with the Kuhtor, a small former city gate and Alte Bastion, another viewpoint. Several magnolias were planted near the Magnolia Pavilion.

The park includes an orchard with an insect hotel and a vineyard yielding about 200 bottles of wine per year. The Wine Pavilion on the hill in the northern part of the park offers a scenic view of the whole Magdalenengarten.

The Rose Museum in the south of Magdalenengarten was inaugurated in 2007.

The garden is open daily from 9 a.m. to 6 p.m. and from 9 a.m. to 8 p.m. in summer. Admission is free.

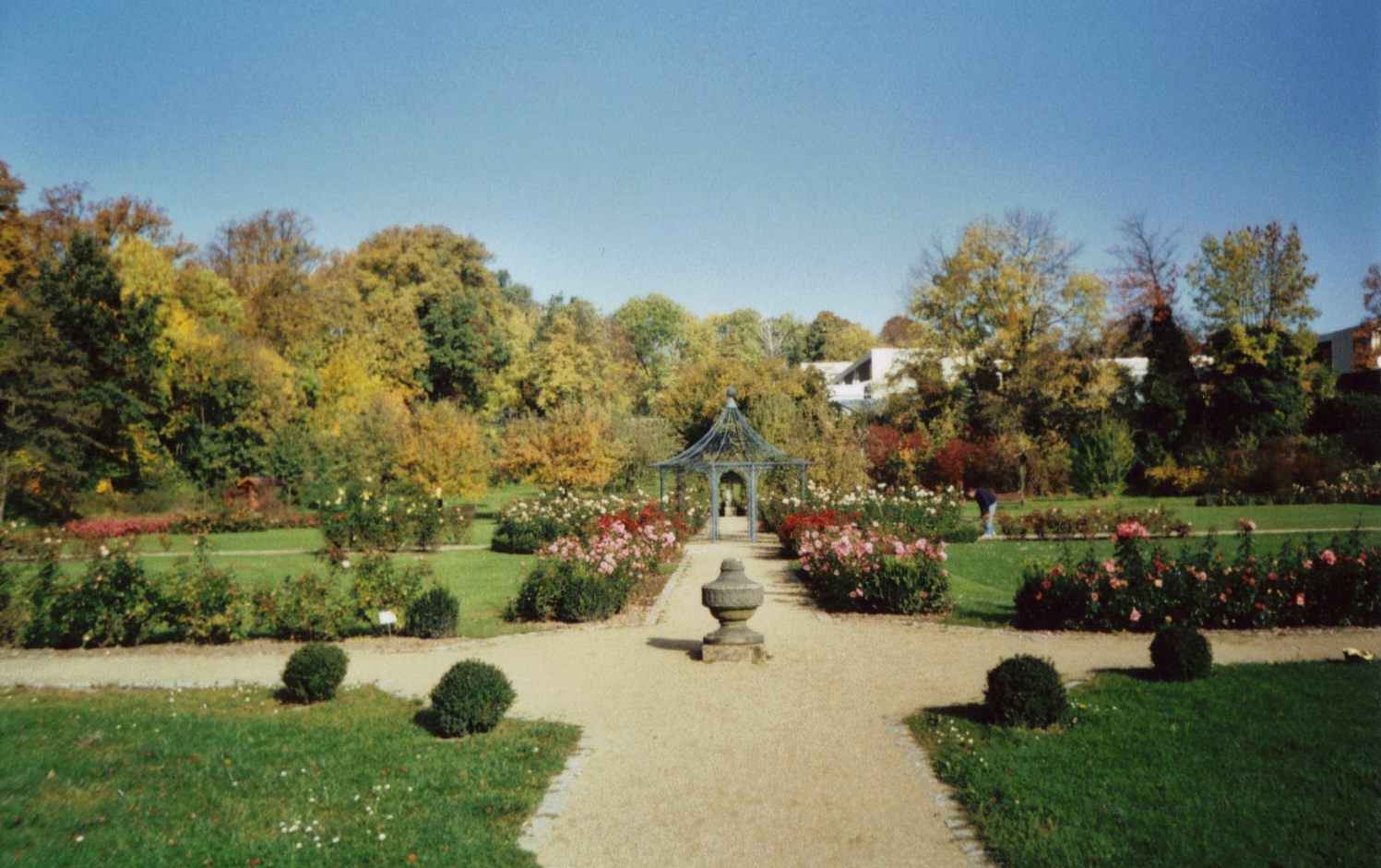
Main path

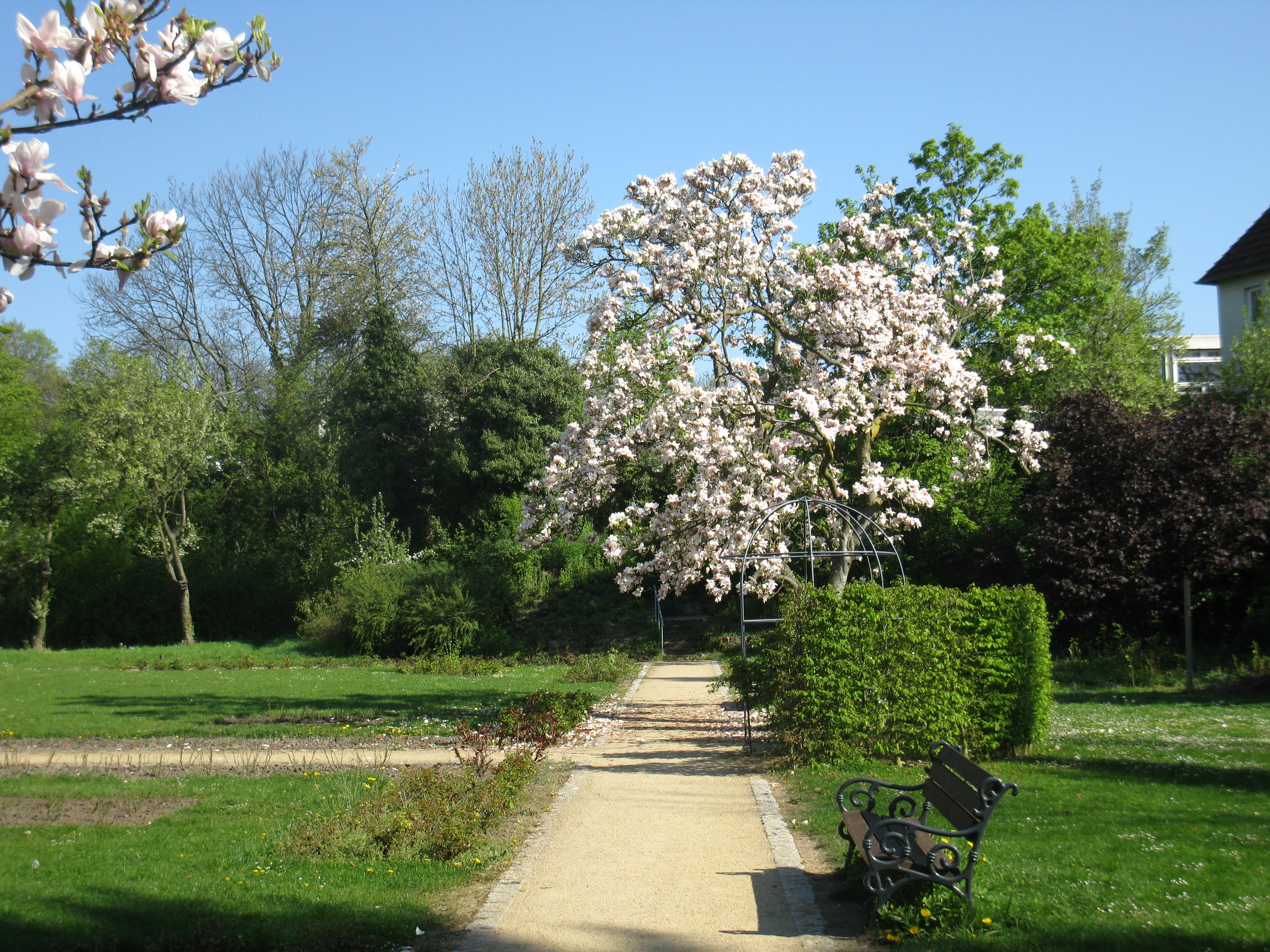
Magnolia pavilion

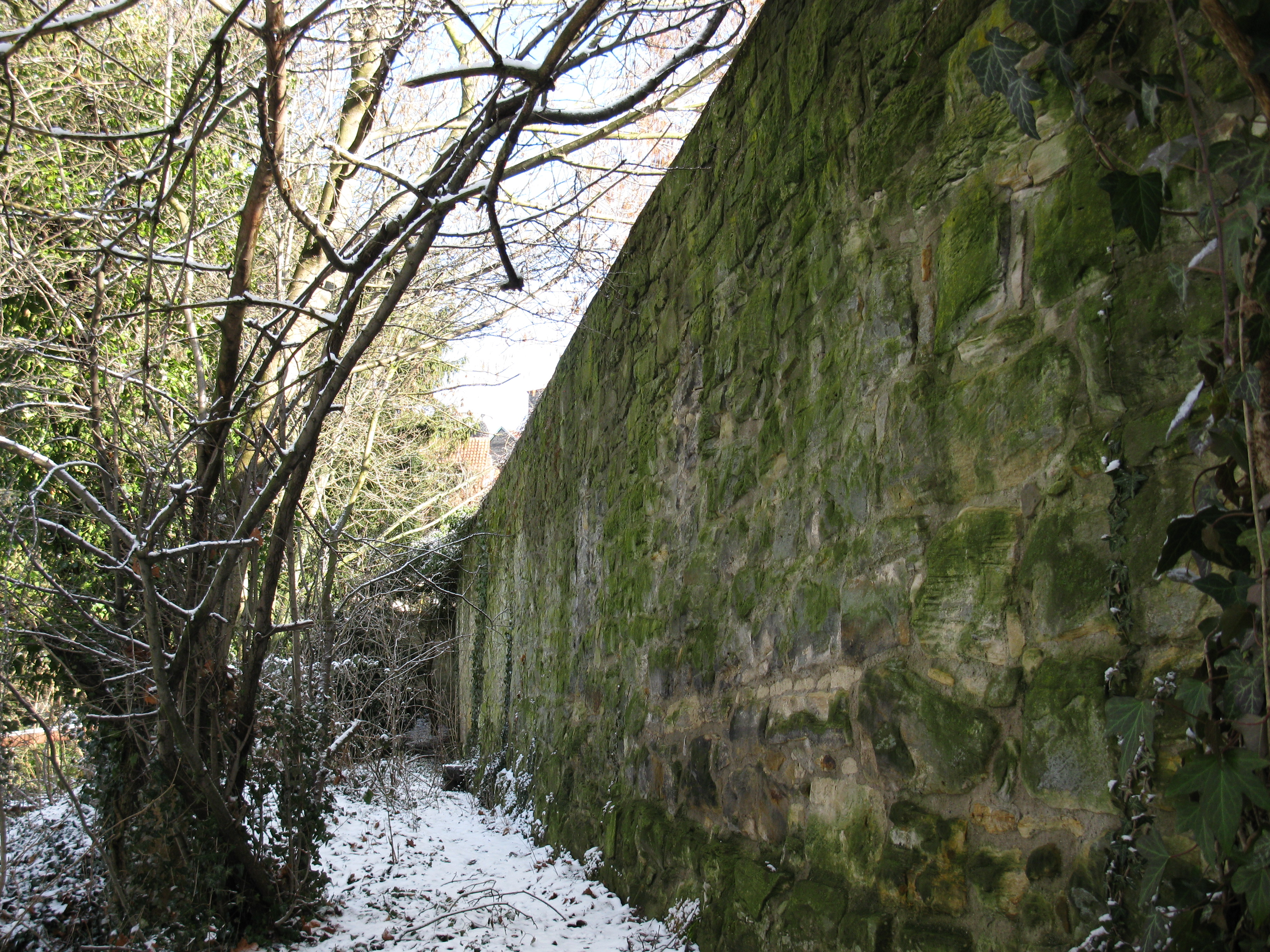
Medieval city wall

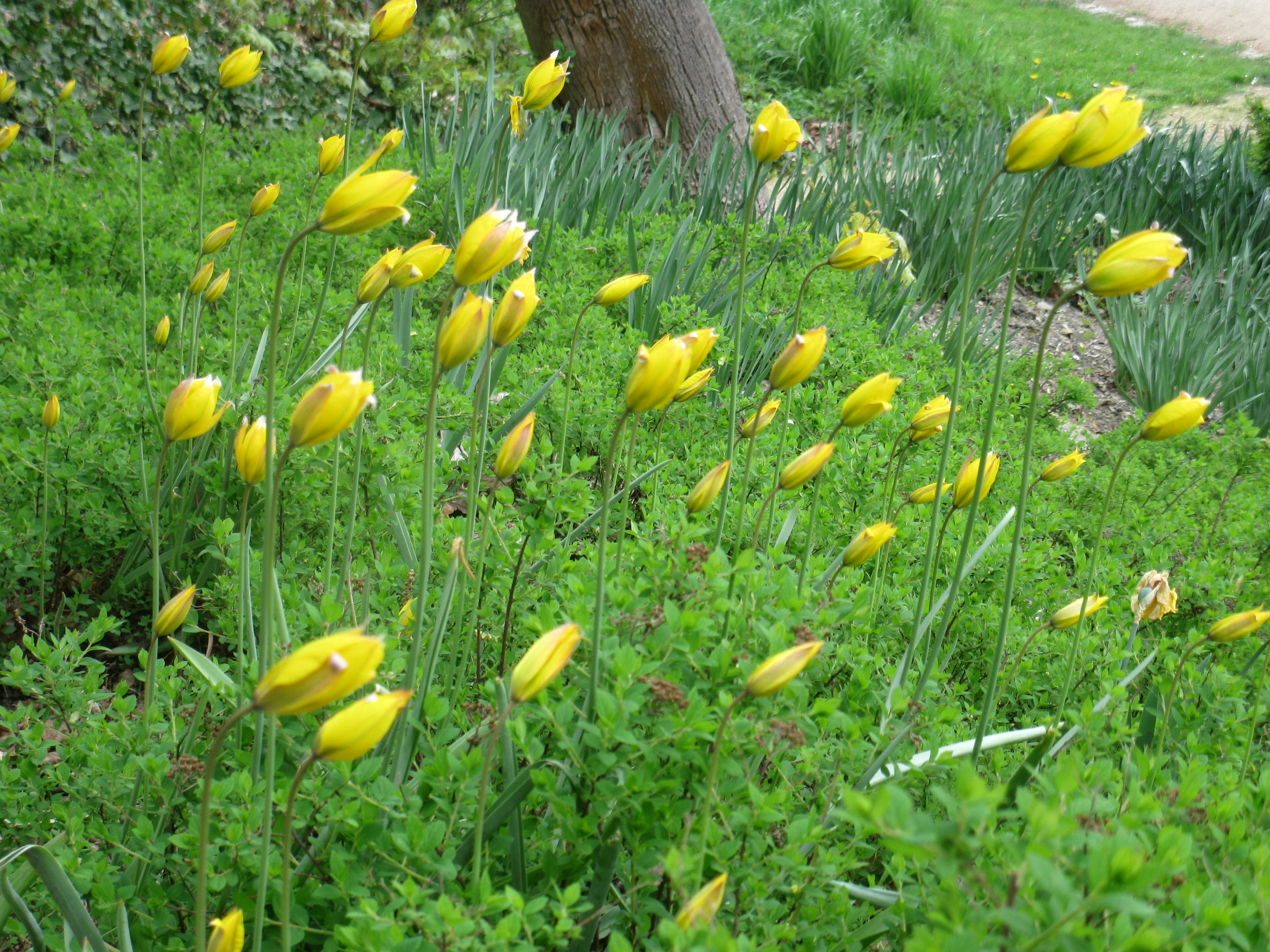
Wild tulips in April

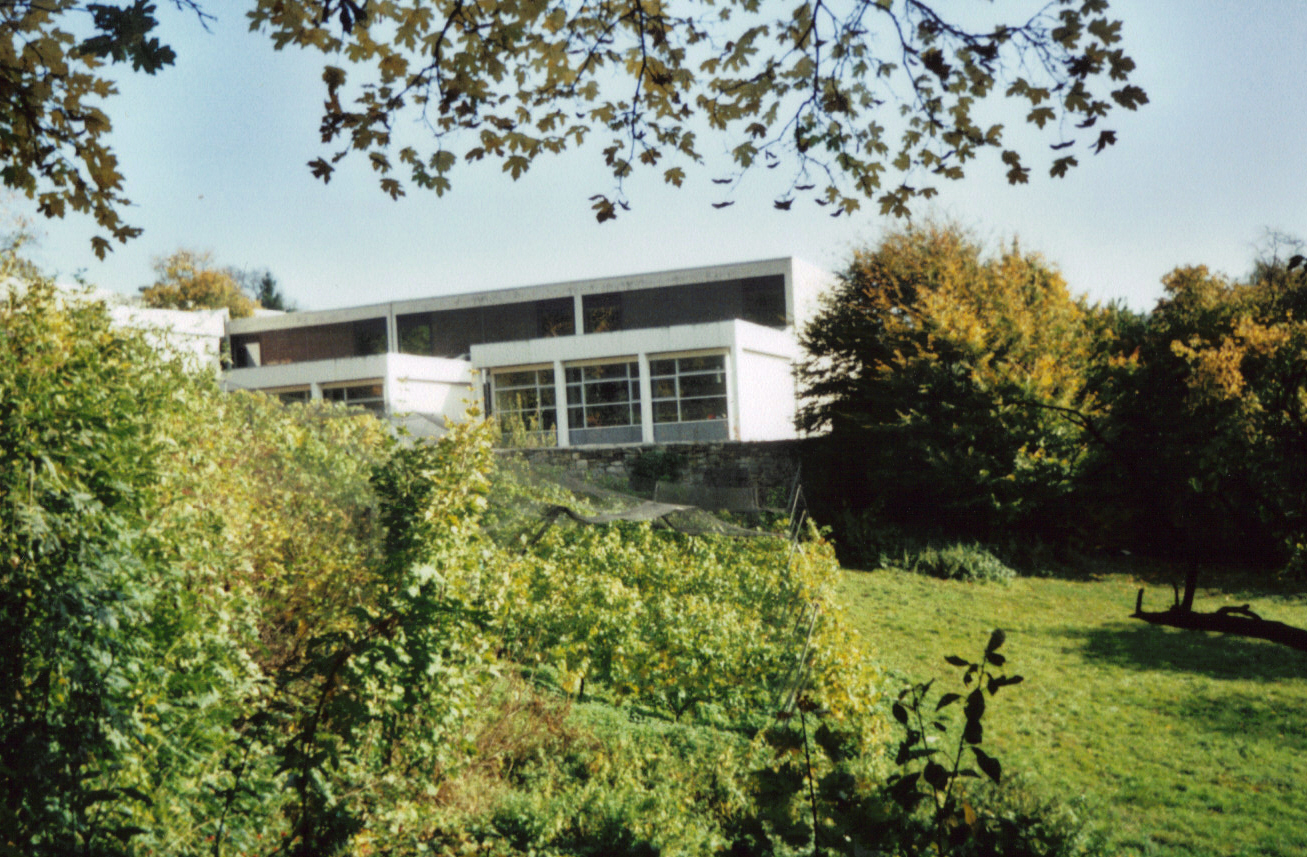
Vineyard
