= Meister des Göttinger Barfüßeraltars =

Gothic German painter in Göttingen

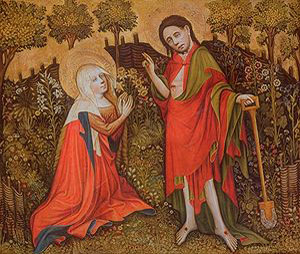
Noli me tangere ca. 1410, Magdalenenkirche, Hildesheim, now in the Staatsgalerie Stuttgart. Narcissi can be seen growing in the background between the two figures.

The Meister des Göttinger Barfüßeraltars (Master of the Göttingen Franciscan Altarpiece) was a Gothic German painter in Göttingen known for the creation of a large altarpiece in the Franciscan Church there in 1424. Although the church was demolished in around 1824, the altarpiece can be seen in the Lower Saxony State Museum (Niedersächsisches Landesmuseum) in Hanover. The painting is 7.87 meters wide and 3.06 meters high, the largest preserved Gothic altarpiece in Lower Saxony (Niedersachsen). It was restored in 2005 after six years of work at a cost of €1.2 million.

Little is known of the painter himself, although he is also referred to as the Meister der Hildesheimer Magdalenenlegende for a work attributed to him in Hildesheim, at the Magdalenenkirche. The altarpiece panels are now housed in a variety of different museums. For instance the Noli me tangere is in the Staatsgalerie Stuttgart. These scenes which depict the legend of Mary Magdalene (Magdalenenlegende) are thought to be his earliest known work.

He appears to be influenced by the work of the Meisters der goldenen Tafel in Lüneburg (c. 1415), because some of the background scenes are similar to Conrad von Soest's Wildunger Altarpiece in Bad Wildungen (c. 1403). His work is considered one of the last examples of the International Gothic period in northern Germany.

== Bibliography ==
- "Master of the Göttinger Barfüsseraltar". Archived from the original on March 6, 2005., In: The Grove Dictionary of Art, Macmillan Publishers, 2000, from Artnet.com, at Internet Archive, March 6, 2005
