= Magdalenenkirche, Hildesheim =

Church in Hildesheim, Germany

Coordinates: 52°09′03″N 9°56′29″E

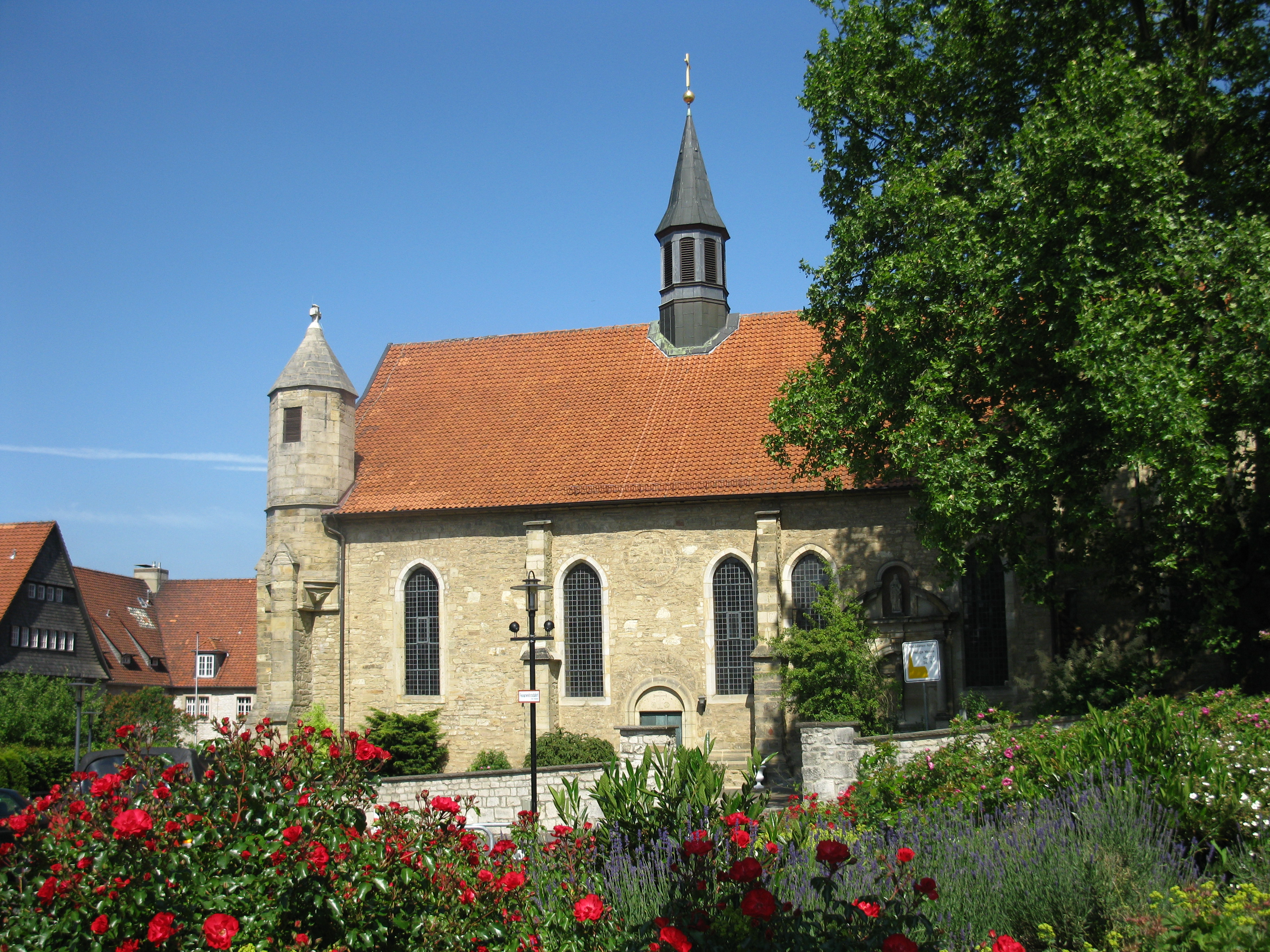
Magdalenenkirche, seen from the south

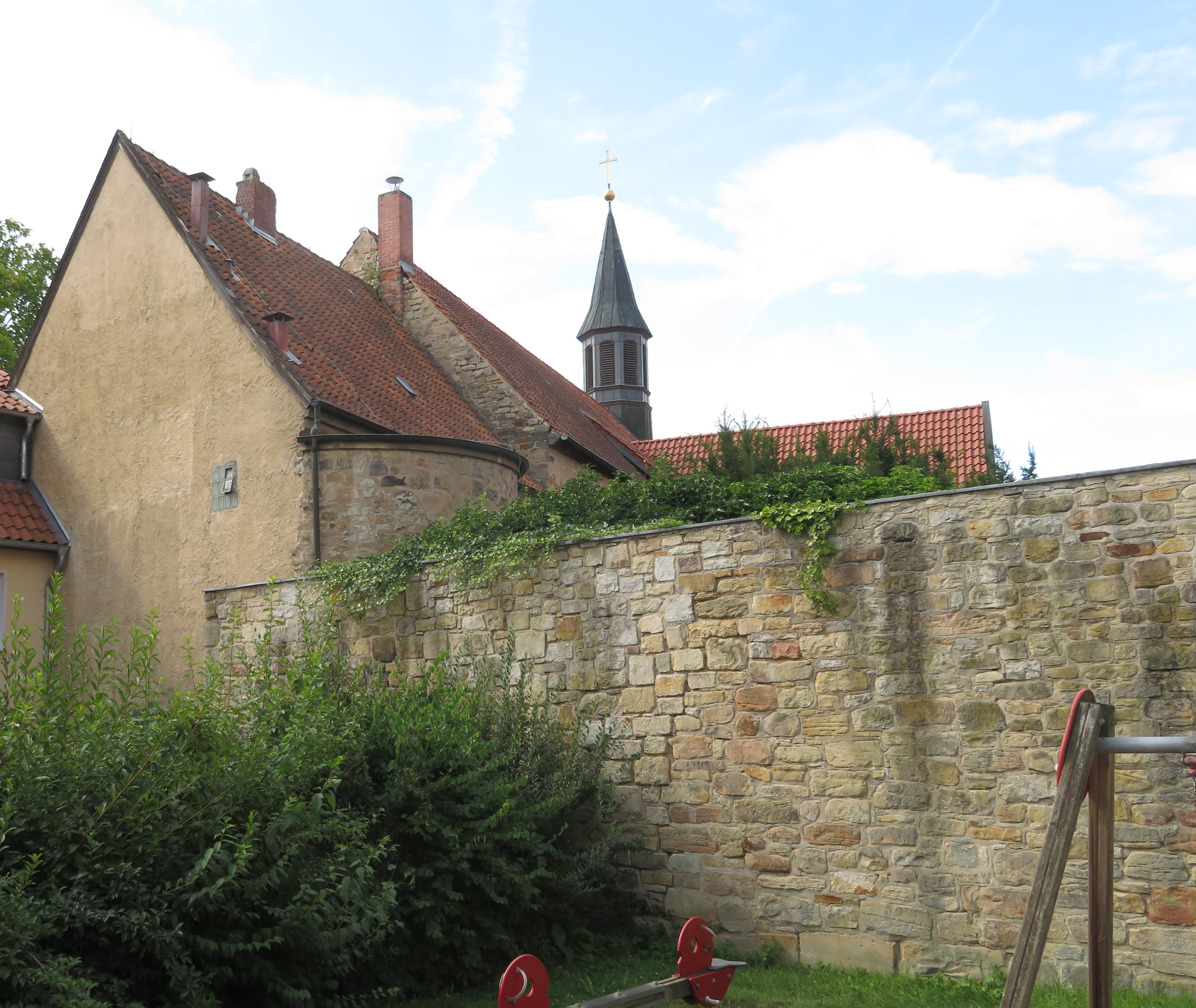
Medieval city wall in Süsternstraße beside the church

The Magdalenenkirche or St. Magdalenen (Church St. Mary Magdalene) is one of the churches in Hildesheim, Lower Saxony, Germany. The Magdalenenkirche is a Catholic church that was once a monastery church, and is situated in the old town at 25 Mühlenstraße.

Founded in 1224, the current building was consecrated in 1294, the first Gothic building in Hildesheim. Extensive rebuilding took place in the 15th century and further additions were made in the 19th century. In the fifteenth century (ca. 1416) an altarpiece was created by an unknown artist, referred to as the Meister des Göttinger Barfüßeraltars depicting scenes from the life of Mary Magdalene (Magdalenenlegende). This has since been broken up and various panels are found in different museums. One of these, the Noli me tangere is in the Staatsgalerie Stuttgart.

The church was badly damaged in World War II on 22 March 1945 and partly restored in a simplified manner. The restoration was completed in 1961. Magdalenengarten, a baroque park laid out 1720–25, is close by. The small street Süsternstraße beside the church features a well-preserved part of the medieval city wall with a round tower.

== Sources ==
- Hermann Engfer: St. Magdalenen Hildesheim. Libertas Verlag für Kirche und Heimat Hubert Baum. Stuttgart 1961.
- Ina Birkenbeul: Das „Elfen-Altarretabel“ in der St. Magdalenenkirche, Hildesheim. Diplomprüfung an der Fachhochschule Hildesheim/Holzminden, Institut für Restaurierung und Denkmalpflege, Winter 1999/2000.
- Werner Lemke, Stefan Mahr, Roman Seifert: Die Seifert-Orgel in St. Magdalenen Hildesheim. DKV-Kunstführer Nr. 662 (Reihe der Klosterkammer Hannover, Heft 3), 1. Auflage, February 2010, ISBN 978-3-422-02259-1.
