= Thomas Hale (agriculturist) =

18th-century agriculturalist and writer

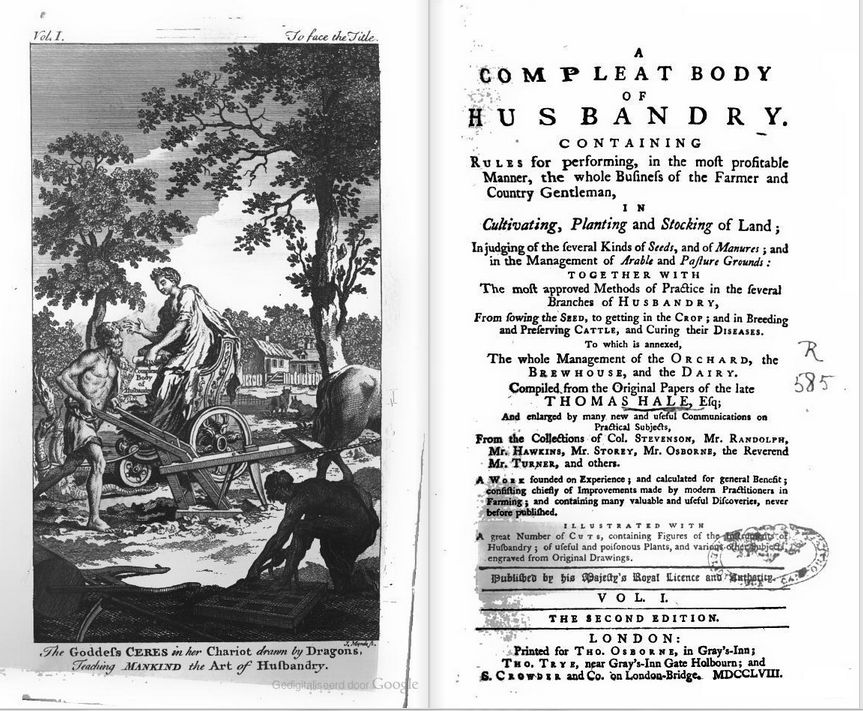
Title page of A Compleat Body of Husbandry, 1758

Thomas Hale (died c. 1759) was an 18th-century British agriculturist, known from his book A Compleat Body of Husbandry, 1756.

== Life and work ==
Little is known about Thomas Hale's life, as no records exist. He probably died around 1756.

His main work was A Compleat Body of Husbandry, published between 1756 and 1758 in four volumes. The work was translated into French by Jean-Baptiste Dupuy-Demportes and published in 1763 as Le gentilhomme cultivateur, ou corps complet d'agriculture., and into German by Peter von Hohenthal and anonymous published under the title Allgemeine Haushaltungs- und Landwissenschaft, aus den sichersten und neuesten Erfahrungen und Entdeckungen geprüfet und in Ausübung gebracht von einer ökonomischen Gesellschaft in England. 5 vols. Hamburg and Leipzig 1759 - 1768.

The British The Complete Farmer: Or, a General Dictionary of Husbandry by members of the Royal Society, first published from 1756 to 1768, considered Thomas Hale among the foremost agriculturists of the time. The 3rd edition of The Complete Farmer (1777) listed Hale in the subtitle of this work among other foremost authorities, such as Carl Linnaeus, Louis François Henri de Menon, Hugh Plat, John Evelyn, John Mortimer, John Worlidge, Jethro Tull, William Ellis, Philip Miller, Edward Lisle, Roque, John Mills, and Arthur Young.

George Washington owned a copy of A Compleat Body of Husbandry.

== Selected publications ==
- Thomas Hale. A Compleat Body of Husbandry, 1756/1758; Volume I; Volume II; Volume III; Volume IV
- Eden. London: Thomas Osborne. 1757.
- John Hill, Thomas Hale, Sir William Beauchamp Proctor. Eden: Or, a Compleat Body of Gardening. Containing Plain and Familiar Directions for Raising the Several Useful Products of a Garden, .... Compiled and Digested from the Papers of the Late Celebrated Mr. Hale, by the Authors of the Compleat Body of Husbandry. .... T. Osborne; T. Trye; S. Crowder and Company; and H. Woodgate,
- Thomas Hale. A compleat body of husbandryers societies in Ireland, Dublin : Printed for Peter Wilson and John Exshaw, 1757
- Thomas Hale. A compleat body of husbandry original drawings. London : Printed for Tho. Osborne, Tho. Trye, and S. Crowder and Co., 1758
- Thomas Hale. A continuation of the compleat body of husbandry containing rules for performing, in the most profitable manner, the whole business of the farmer, and country gentleman, in cultivating, planting, and stocking of land ..., 1759
- Thomas Hale, Jean-Baptiste Dupuy-Demportes Le Gentilhomme cultivateur, ou corps complet d'agriculture 1764
