= Marie Curie (charity) =

United Kingdom charitable organisation

- Founded: 6 July 1948
- Type: Charities
- Registration no.: England and Wales: 207994
- Purpose: Health care, Health policy, Hospice care, Terminal illness care, Palliative care, End-of-life care, Research, Nursing
- Location: Marie Curie, One Embassy Gardens, 8 Viaduct Gardens, London, SW11 7BW
- Coordinates: 51.4880°N 0.1237°W
- Region served: United Kingdom
- Patron: The King
- Revenue: £170 million (2022)
- Employees: 3,883 (2022)
- Website: http://www.mariecurie.org.uk
- Formerly called: Marie Curie Cancer Care, Marie Curie Memorial Foundation, Marie Curie Hospital for Cancer and Allied Diseases

Marie Curie is a registered charitable organisation in the United Kingdom which provides hospice care and support for anyone with an illness they are likely to die from, and those close to them, and campaigns for better support for dying people. It was established in 1948, the same year as the National Health Service (NHS).

In the financial year 2021/22, the charity supported 66,024 people through its nursing services, hospices and support line calls. It runs nine hospices in Belfast, Bradford, Cardiff, Edinburgh, Glasgow, Hampstead, Liverpool, Newcastle, and the West Midlands. The charity's information and support service was used more than 1.2 million times.

Marie Curie campaigns on issues affecting people with terminal illness, their families and carers. According to the organisation, it is the largest charitable funder of palliative and end-of-life care research in the United Kingdom.

== History ==
The Marie Curie Hospital was founded in Hampstead, North London in 1930. It was staffed entirely by women to treat female cancer patients using radiology and had some research facilities too. Marie Curie gave the hospital permission to use her name.

In 1944, most of the hospital was destroyed in an air raid during the Second World War. Four years later, Bernard Robinson OBE and a committee set about re-establishing the hospital and decided to separate it from the newly formed NHS. This was the beginning of the Marie Curie Memorial Foundation − a charity which began by dedicating itself to caring for people with cancer, and today has evolved into the leading UK end of life charity for people with any terminal illness including motor neurone disease, Parkinson's and Dementia.

Marie Curie charity was founded in 1948. The charity continued to use the name of scientist Marie Curie, with permission from her daughter Eve.

Following the donation of an engagement ring to help raise money for the charity, the very first appeal was launched and brought in a substantial £4,000.

== Nurses ==
Marie Curie Nurses and Health Care Assistants provide home hospice care for thousands of people with terminal illnesses across the UK every year. This includes managing their pain, and providing practical care and giving emotional support. Marie Curie's nursing service also provide practical and emotional support for families and carers.

Together with statutory government NHS funding, voluntary contributions are essential for Marie Curie to be able to provide nursing services. In the financial year 2021/22, they were funded 46% by charitable donations and 54% by the NHS.

== Hospices ==
Marie Curie Hospices provide specialist care and support for people living with a terminal illness and those close to them through inpatient, outpatient, and virtual services. There are Marie Curie Hospices in Belfast, Bradford, Edinburgh, Glasgow, London (Hampstead), Liverpool, Newcastle, Penarth (near Cardiff), and the Marie Curie Hospice, West Midlands in Solihull.

Marie Curie hospices are free at the point of access. They run on a combination of statutory government NHS funding and voluntary contributions to run. In the financial year 2021/22, they were funded 59% through charitable donations and 41% by the NHS.

On Wednesday 2nd July 2025, Chief Executive, Matthew Reed, announced that the 26 bed Inpatient Ward at Woolton, Liverpool was to close permanently, citing staff shortages and financial issues. A Hospice at the former Sunnybank site had served the people of Liverpool since 1959, with Marie Curie taking over the site in 1992. A “Buy a Brick” campaign helped fund a new purpose-built building.

== Support line ==
Marie Curie runs a free, UK-wide support line service to provide practical information and emotional support on all aspects of life with terminal illness, dying and bereavement. The service includes a phone line, call-back service, web chat, an online community, and information online and in print.

Marie Curie also offers a free bereavement support service which matches people experiencing grief with specially trained volunteers for regular support.

Both services are funded by charitable donations.

== Volunteer services ==
The charity runs Companion volunteer services at home, in hospitals and over the phone for people living with a terminal illness which provide companionship and respite towards the end of life.

== Campaigning ==
Marie Curie campaigns on issues which affect people living with a terminal illness and those close to them.

In 2021, their Scrap Six Months campaign with the Motor Neurone Disease Association resulted in a change in the law in Scotland, Northern Ireland, England and Wales. This made it easier for people diagnosed with a terminal illness to access the benefits they need.

Previously, there was a rule in place meaning people diagnosed with a terminal illness could only get quick and easy access to financial support if a doctor or nurse said they had less than six months to live.

In 2022, Marie Curie's campaign to Make End of Life Care Fair resulted in a change being made to the UK Government's Health and Care Bill. The change will mean that, in the future, end of life care must be provided by law in every part of England where local people need it.

== Policy and research ==
Marie Curie is the UK's leading charitable funder of palliative and end of life care research. It funds its own researchers, and works in partnership with other organisations. Marie Curie research investments aim to improve the care and support that people affected by any terminal illness and their families receive.

Every year, the charity awards research project grants in open competition through the Marie Curie Research Grants Scheme. All applications are subject to a process of external peer review before a final decision is made by an independent funding committee.

Marie Curie supports and funds the work of two long term Palliative Care Research Facilities across the UK − the Marie Curie Palliative Care Research Unit, UCL and the Marie Curie Palliative Care Research Centre, Cardiff University. It hosts an annual research conference with professionals from across research, policy and health and social care to share the latest evidence and innovation in palliative and end of life care.

The charity also encourages research across its hospices and nursing service. To help achieve this, three posts are held through its Research Facilitator Programme at Marie Curie Hospices in Belfast, Edinburgh and the West Midlands.

== Fundraising ==
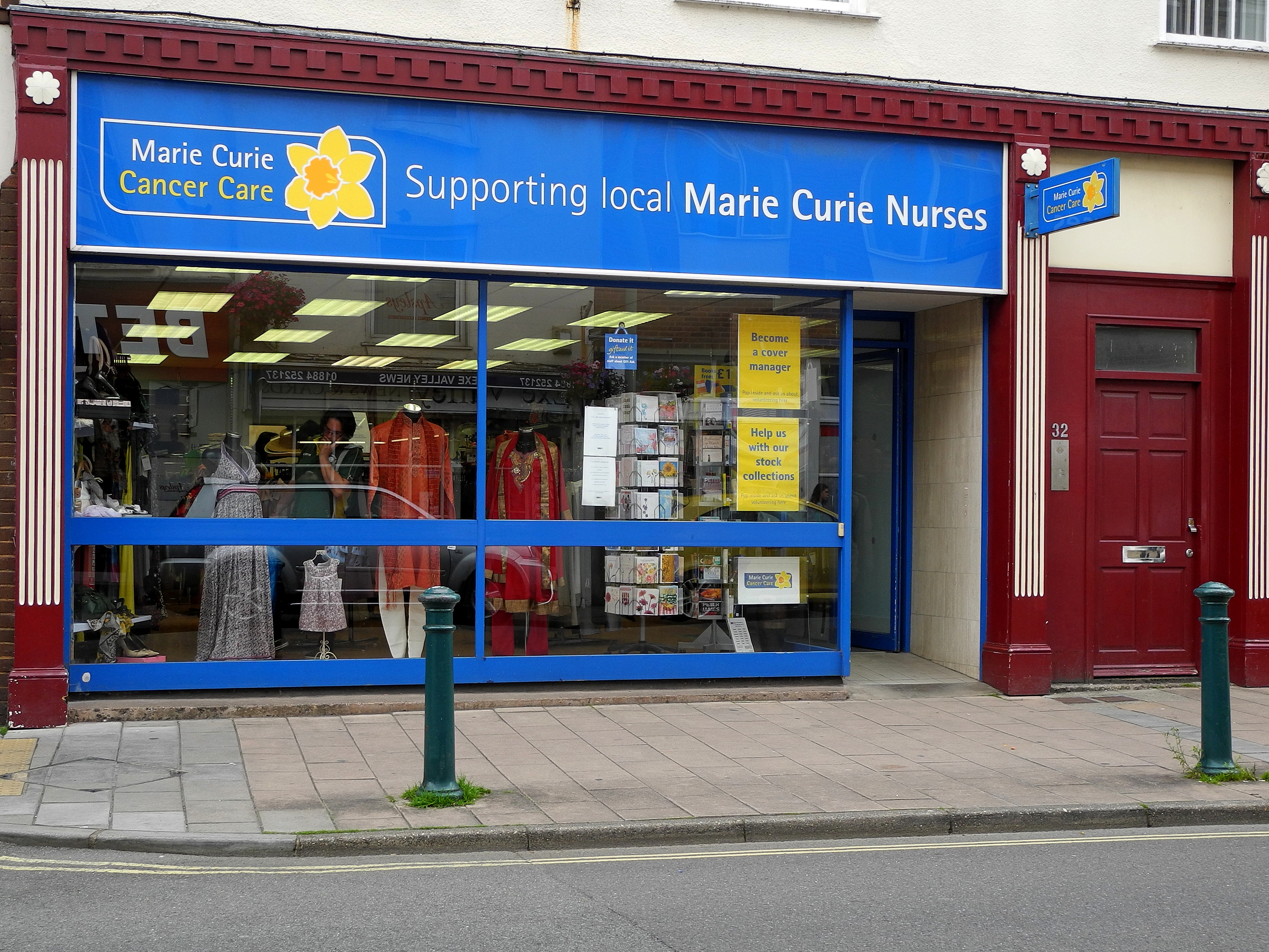
A Marie Curie charity shop in Tiverton, Devon

Marie Curie adopted the daffodil emblem in 1986 as a positive, resilient, life-affirming symbol, with a bright and joyful yellow colour. Marie Curie's biggest fundraising campaign is called The Great Daffodil Appeal and takes place throughout March each year.

The charity raises money in a variety of ways, including through charity shops, corporate partnerships, philanthropy, mass participation events, social events, direct giving campaigns, digital and TV campaigns, gifts in wills and bucket collections.

The Great Daffodil Appeal is Marie Curie's flagship fundraising campaign. Members of the public fundraise and donate, and wear a daffodil in support of the charity and better end of life care for all.

On 23 March 2021, Marie Curie led the first National Day of Reflection in the wake of the coronavirus pandemic to commemorate the people who had died and support the millions of people who'd been bereaved. This returned for a second and third year in 2022 and 2023.
