= Great Daffodil Appeal =

The Great Daffodil Appeal is Marie Curie's biggest annual fundraising campaign. Every March, millions of people across the UK support this fundraising event by giving a small donation to wear a daffodil pin. It is usually yellow in colour. This makes it one of the UK's most recognisable charity appeals. Money raised through the appeal helps Marie Curie provide free care and support to people living with a terminal illnesses.

== History ==
The first Great Daffodil Appeal took place in 1986 with volunteers collecting donations and handing out fresh daffodils.

In 1990 the Liverpool Marie Curie Society, in conjunction with Liverpool City Council, planted one million daffodils in the city's Sefton Park to create a "Field of Hope". This led to other Fields of Hope being established in other parks in the city over the years.

In 1995, Marie Curie replaced fresh flowers with fabric daffodil pins. Three million were given out and £1.2 million was donated. In 2005, the charity used the term 'Great Daffodil Appeal' for the first time.

In 2011, actress Alison Steadman appeared in the charity's first TV advertising campaign for the appeal. Steadman has continued her support for the appeal, appearing in TV ads in 2012, 2014 and 2015, as well as a 2016 radio advert with actor Dominic West.

== Key facts ==
In 2014/15, the charity provided care to more than 40,700 people with terminal illnesses, and is the largest provider of hospice beds outside the NHS.

The millions raised by the Great Daffodil Appeal over the years have enabled Marie Curie to provide more free hands-on care to people living with a terminal illness, usually in their own homes or at one of the charity's nine hospices.

During the 2015 Great Daffodil Appeal, more than 22,000 collectors took on 34,000 collections.

As part of the 2016 appeal, supporters were also encouraged to raise funds by doing something they love, such as hosting a bake sale or quiz night.
