= 1947 in art =

Events from the year 1947 in art.

== Events ==
- January 14 – Jackson Pollock's fourth solo exhibition opens in the Daylight Gallery of Peggy Guggenheim's The Art of This Century gallery on Manhattan. Later this year, Guggenheim closes the gallery and Pollock produces the first of his Drip Paintings, the series that brings him international acclaim, in the Springs, East Hampton, New York.
- February 12 – Christian Dior introduces The "New Look" in women's fashion, in Paris.
- October 2 – São Paulo Museum of Art opens to the public in Brazil.
- October
  - Anthony Blunt takes office as director of the Courtauld Institute of Art in the University of London.
  - Art by the Miner Exhibition opened at the Academy Cinema on Oxford Street in London by Prime Minister Clement Attlee.
- Journalist Tancrede Marcil Jr. coins the term Les Automatistes in a review of their Montreal exhibition.
- Norman Rockwell produces the first of his Four Seasons calendar illustrations for Brown & Bigelow.
- Lebanese woman painter Saloua Raouda Choucair stages what is perhaps the Arab world's first abstract art exhibition, at the Arab Cultural Gallery in Beirut.
- Béla Hamvas and his wife Katalin write Forradalom a művészetben: Absztrakció és szürrealizmus Magyarországon ("Revolution in Art: Abstraction and Surrealism in Hungary").
- Robert Woods Bliss acquires the Dumbarton Oaks birthing figure.

== Awards ==
- Archibald Prize: William Dargie – Sir Marcus Clark, KBE

== Works ==
- Victor Brauner – Hommage à Marcel Duchamp
- Aristide Berto Cianfarani – Statue of John V. Power
- Paul Delvaux – The Great Sirens
- Sir Russell Drysdale – Sofala
- M. C. Escher
  - Another World (woodcut)
  - Crystal (mezzotint)
  - Up and Down (lithograph)
- Alberto Giacometti
  - Man Pointing (sculpture; bronze castings in MoMA, New York, and Tate, England)
  - Man Walking (sculpture)
  - Hand (sculpture)
- Jean Hélion – A Rebours (Musée National d'Art Moderne, Paris)
- Alfred Janes – Little Cactus
- Louis le Brocquy – Travelling Woman with Newspaper
- Henri Matisse
  - Deux fillettes, fond jaune et rouge
  - Le Lanceur De Couteaux (cutout)
- Sidney Nolan – The Trial
- José Clemente Orozco – watercolor illustrations for John Steinbeck's The Pearl
- Eduardo Paolozzi – I was a Rich Man's Plaything (collage)
- Bill Traylor – Construction with Figures and Animals
- Andrew Wyeth – Wind from the Sea

== Births ==
- January 6 – Henry Orlik, German-born British surrealist painter of Polish and Belorussian heritage
- January 9 – Ronnie Landfield, American abstract painter
- January 16 – Jamie Reid, English punk visual artist (died 2023)
- January 27 – Cal Schenkel, American painter and illustrator
- February 14 – Ed Hamilton, American sculptor
- March 12 – Kalervo Palsa, Finnish artist (died 1987)
- March 18 – Drew Struzan, American artist, illustrator and designer (died 2025)
- March 27 – Daphne Todd, English portrait painter
- March 29 – Sarah Charlesworth, American conceptual artist and photographer (died 2013)
- April 7 – Peggy Cooper Cafritz, born Pearl Alice Cooper, African American art collector (died 2018)
- April 17 – Sherrie Levine, American appropriation artist
- April 20 – Vladimír Novák, Czech painter
- June 1 – Anna Hofman-Uddgren, Swedish actress, cabaret singer, music hall and revue artist and theatre and film director
- June 5 – Laurie Anderson, American experimental performance artist and musician
- June 15 – John Hoagland, American photographer (died 1984)
- July 27 – Shalom Tomáš Neuman, Czech born American sculptor and painter
- December – Richard Amsel, American illustrator and graphic designer (died 1985)
- December 22 – Hiroshi Nagai, Japanese graphic designer and illustrator

== Deaths ==
- January 14 – MacDonald Gill, English designer (born 1884)
- January 23 – Pierre Bonnard, French painter and printmaker (born 1867)
- March 2 – Stanhope Forbes, English painter of the Newlyn school (born 1857)
- March 19 – Prudence Heward, Canadian painter (born 1896)
- March 25 – Chen Cheng-po, Taiwanese painter (born 1895) (shot)
- April 21 – Gustave Van de Woestijne, Belgian Expressionist painter (born 1881)
- May 25 – Rupert Bunny, Australian painter (born 1864)
- June 9 – Augusto Giacometti, Swiss painter (born 1877)
- June 14 – Albert Marquet, French Fauvist painter (born 1875)
- July 25 – Kathleen Scott (Lady Scott), British sculptor (born 1878)
- August 9 – Seraphima Blonskaya, Russian painter and art teacher (born 1870)
- August 17 – Wilhelm Uhde, German art collector, dealer, author, and critic (born 1874)
- September 20 – Edward McCartan, American sculptor (born 1879)
- November 3 – Robert Borlase Smart, English painter and critic (born 1881)
- November 8 – Mariano Benlliure, Spanish sculptor (born 1862)
- November 13 – Julian Smith Australian surgeon and photographer (born 1873)
- November 20 – Georg Kolbe, German sculptor (born 1877)
- December 1 – Samuel Courtauld, English art collector (born 1876)
- December 30 – Han van Meegeren, Dutch painter and art forger (born 1889)

== See also ==
- 1947 in fine arts of the Soviet Union
