= 1948 in art =

Events from the year 1948 in art.

== Events ==
- Summer – The art exhibitions at the Venice Biennale are revived, introducing American abstract expressionism to Europe and part of the Peggy Guggenheim Collection to Venice.
- November 8 – COBRA (avant-garde movement) is formed by Karel Appel, Constant, Corneille, Christian Dotremont, Asger Jorn and Joseph Noiret.
- Georges Braque begins work on his Ateliers.
- The Colony Room Club, a private members' drinking club at 41 Dean Street, Soho, London, is founded and presided over by Muriel Belcher; painter Francis Bacon becomes a member the day after it opens, establishing it as a centre for London's alcoholic artistic elite.
- Cadillac introduce the car tailfin, to Frank Hershey's design authorized by Harley Earl.

== Exhibitions ==
- April 12 unti May 12 - "de Kooning" at the Charles Egan Gallery in New York City.
- September 21 until December 5 - Collage (curated by Margaret Miller) at MoMA in New York City.

== Awards ==
- Archibald Prize: William Dobell – Margaret Olley

== Works ==
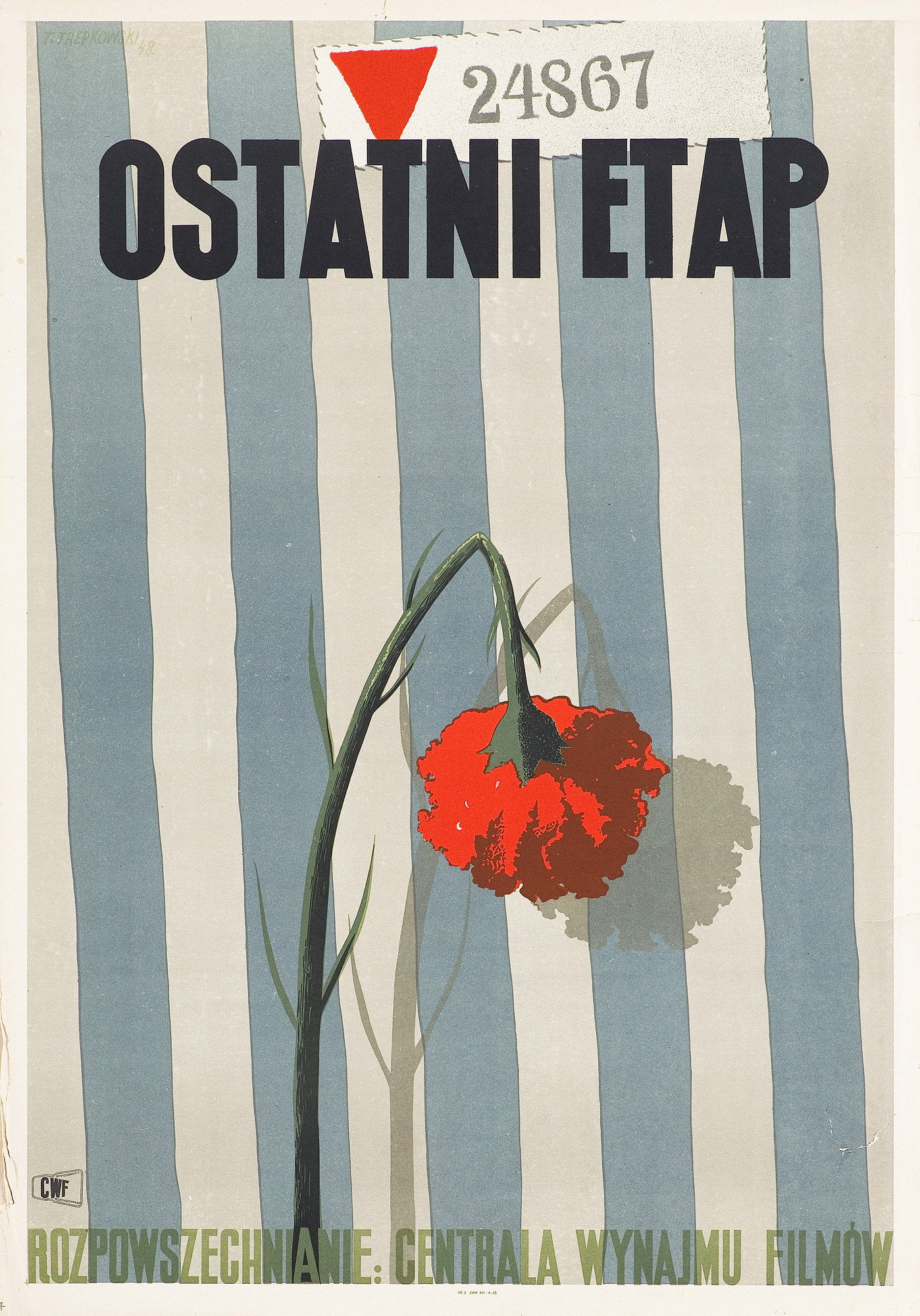
Tadeusz Trepkowski – movie poster Ostatni etap

=== Paintings ===
- Victor Brauner – Meeting with Myself at the four Cats of the World
- Willem de Kooning
  - Black Friday
  - Secretary
- Otto Dix – Ecce homo with self-likeness behind barbed wire
- Russell Drysdale – The cricketers
- Rudolf Hausner – It's Me!
- Isabel Lambert – Three Fish
- Henri Matisse – The Plum Blossoms
- Barnett Newman – Onement I
- Sidney Nolan – The Abandoned Mine
- Jackson Pollock – No. 5, 1948
- Anne Redpath – Window in Menton
- Constance Stokes – Girl in Red Tights (approx. date)
- Rufino Tamayo – Cazadores de mariposas
- Andrew Wyeth
  - Christina's World
  - McVey's Barn
  - Karl

=== Sculpture ===
- Wäinö Aaltonen – Kun ystävyyssuhteet solmitaan
- Joseph Cornell
  - Medici Princess
  - Untitled (Cockatoo and Corks)
- Jacob Epstein – Lazarus
- Marino Marini – The Angel of the City
- Gerda Sprinchorn – Linnéstaty (modeled 1907)
- Iglica in Wrocław
- Thomas W. Talbot Monument

=== Graphic works ===
- M. C. Escher
  - Dewdrop (mezzotint)
  - Drawing Hands (lithograph)
  - Stars (wood engraving)
- Tadeusz Trepkowski – Ostatni etap (movie poster)

== Births ==
- January 24 – Machiko Satonaka, Japanese manga artist
- March 9 – Eric Fischl, American painter
- March 14 – James Nachtwey, American photojournalist
- April 14 – Berry Berenson, American model and photographer (d. 2001)
- June 30 – Wolf Erlbruch, German children's book illustrator and writer
- July 7 – Alison Wilding, English sculptor and academic
- September 20 – Adrian Piper, American conceptual artist
- October 2 – Donna Karan, American fashion designer
- October 8 – Gottfried Helnwein, Austrian fine artist, photographer, installation and performance artist
- November 1 – Bill Woodrow, British sculptor
- November 18 – Ana Mendieta, Cuban American performance artist (d. 1985)
- December 18 – Mimmo Paladino, Italian sculptor, painter and printmaker
- December 26 – Lin Onus, Scottish-Aboriginal Koori artist (d. 1996)
- Full date unknown
  - Jonathan Lasker, American abstract painter
  - Christopher Makos, American photographer
  - Marilyn Minter, American painter and photographer
  - Roberta Smith, American art critic (The New York Times)
  - Andrew Stevovich, Austrian-born American painter

== Deaths ==
- January 8 – Kurt Schwitters, German painter, collagist and poet (b. 1887)
- January 21 – Ambrosia Tønnesen, Norwegian sculptor (b. 1859)
- February 23 – Fidus, German illustrator, painter and publisher (b. 1868)
- March 23 – Yevgeniy Abalakov, Soviet sculptor and mountaineer (b. 1907)
- March 24 – Sigrid Hjertén, Swedish modernist painter (b. 1885)
- July 21 – Arshile Gorky, Armenian American painter (b. 1904)
- August – Feliu Elias, Spanish caricaturist and painter (b. 1878)
- September 9 – Ignacy Pieńkowski, Polish painter (b. 1877)
- September 22 – Felicjan Kowarski, Polish painter and sculptor (b. 1885)
- October 17 – Royal Cortissoz, American art critic (b. 1869)
- November 4 – Shinzō Fukuhara, Japanese photographer (b. 1883)
- December 28 – Hakob Gyurjian, Armenian sculptor (b. 1890)
- December 30 – George Ault, American Precisionist painter (b. 1891)
- Date unknown – Hector Hyppolite, Haitian painter (b. 1894)

== See also ==
- 1948 in Fine Arts of the Soviet Union
