= 1941 in art =

Events from the year 1941 in art.

== Events ==
- March 17 – In Washington, D.C., the National Gallery of Art is officially opened by President Franklin D. Roosevelt.
- July 14 – American art collector Peggy Guggenheim and German painter Max Ernst arrive in New York City, fleeing occupied Europe.
- August 12 – The first evacuated paintings from the National Gallery in London are moved to underground storage at a slate quarry beneath Manod Mawr in North Wales.
- October 24 – English artist Brian Stonehouse is captured as a Special Operations Executive agent in France.
- October 31 – Work ceases on sculpting Mount Rushmore National Memorial in the United States, continued by Lincoln Borglum after the death in March of his father Gutzon Borglum.
- December 8 – The exhibition American Negro Art: Nineteenth and Twentieth Centuries opens in Edith Halpert's Downtown Gallery in New York City.
- December 30 – Peggy Guggenheim marries the exiled Max Ernst in Virginia.
- Ettore DeGrazia's work appears for the first time in Arizona Highways magazine.
- African-American painter Jacob Lawrence completes his Migration Series.
- German-Jewish painter Charlotte Salomon, in hiding in the south of France, begins the autobiographical series of paintings Leben? oder Theater?: Ein Singspiel ("Life? or Theater?: A Song-play").
- Indiana University Art Museum established in Bloomington.
- The Art Center in La Jolla established in California.

== Awards ==
- Archibald Prize: William Dargie – Sir James Elder, KBE

== Works ==
- Ansel Adams – Moonrise, Hernandez, New Mexico (photograph)
- Ethel V. Ashton – Defenders of the Wyoming Country 1778 (United States post office mural, Tunkhannock, Pennsylvania)
- Max Beckmann – Double Portrait, Max Beckmann and Quappi
- Peter Belov – 1941 ("Large Stalin and Red Army")
- Paul Cadmus – Aviator
- Paul Delvaux
  - The Anxious City
  - The Phases of the Moon
- A. E. Doyle and Associates – Loyal B. Stearns Memorial Fountain (Portland, Oregon)
- Sir Russell Drysdale – Moody's pub
- Jacob Epstein – Jacob and the Angel (alabaster sculpture, 1940–1)
- Ivon Hitchens
  - Damp Autumn
  - Interior, Boy in Bed
- Edward Hopper – Girlie Show
- Marcel Jean – Armoire Surréaliste
- Yousuf Karsh – The Roaring Lion (photographic portrait of Winston Churchill)
- Dame Laura Knight – In For Repairs
- Alonzo Victor Lewis – Dr. Mark A. Matthews (bronze bust, Denny Park (Seattle))
- Musa McKim – Wildlife in White Mountain and Philip Guston – Pulp Wood Logging (murals at Federal Building (Laconia, New Hampshire))
- Roberto Matta
  - Composition Abstraite
  - Ecouter Vivre
  - Foeu
  - The Initiation (Origine d’un Extrême)
  - Invasion of the Night
  - Théorie de l’Arbre
- Paul Nash
  - Battle of Britain
  - Totes Meer
- John Petts – Alun Lewis
- Pablo Picasso
  - Dora Maar au Chat
  - Tete de femme (Dora Maar) (sculpture)
- Horace Pippin – Self-portrait
- Albin Polasek – Masaryk Memorial, Chicago
- Walter Sickert – London Street, Bath
- Victor Vasarely – Untitled
- Carel Weight
  - Escape of the Zebra from the Zoo during an Air Raid
  - It happened to us – daylight raid

== Births ==
- April 13 – Jean-Marc Reiser, French comics artist (d. 1983)
- May 23 – Martin Puryear, American sculptor
- June 7 – Tony Ray-Jones, English photographer (d. 1972)
- July 12 – Richard Tuttle, American postminimalist sculptor, painter and installation artist
- July 22 – Vaughn Bodē, American underground comix, graphic design and graffiti artist (d. 1975)
- August 29 – Ugo Nespolo, Italian painter and filmmaker
- September 20 – Dale Chihuly, American glass sculptor.
- September 24 – Linda McCartney, née Eastman, American music photographer (d. 1998)
- December 6 – Bruce Nauman, American installation and video artist
- December 31 – Robert Lenkiewicz, English painter (d. 2002)
- date unknown
  - Mary Kelly, American conceptual artist
  - James Coleman, Irish installation and video artist
  - Don Perlis, American realist painter
  - Irene Avaalaaqiaq Tiktaalaaq, Canadian Inuk artist

== Deaths ==
- January 10 – John Lavery, Irish painter and war artist (b. 1856)
- February 6 – Maximilien Luce, French painter (b. 1858)
- March 6 – Gutzon Borglum, American sculptor (b. 1867)
- March 30 – Bertha Jaques, American etcher (b. 1863)
- April 14 – Guillermo Kahlo, German-Mexican photographer (b. 1871)
- April 16 – Émile Bernard, French Post-Impressionist painter (b. 1868)
- October 25 – Robert Delaunay, French painter (b. 1885)
- November 7 – Frank Pick, English transport administrator and patron of art and design (b. 1878)
- December 3 – Pavel Filonov, Russian painter and poet (b. 1883)
- December 5 – Amrita Sher-Gil, Indian painter (b. 1913)
- December 30 – El Lissitzky, Russian designer, architect and photographer (b. 1890)
- date unknown – William Jacob Baer, American miniature painter (b. 1860)

== See also ==
- 1941 in fine arts of the Soviet Union
