= Sofala (disambiguation) =

Sofala may refer to:

- Sofala, a former seaport in Mozambique
- Sofala Bank, the continental shelf off the coast of Mozambique
- Sofala Province, a province in Mozambique
- Sofala, New South Wales, a former gold rush town in western New South Wales
- 1393 Sofala, a main-belt asteroid
- Sofala (Drysdale), a 1947 painting by Russell Drysdale
