= Girl in Red Tights =

Painting by Constance Stokes

- Artist: Constance Stokes
- Year: c1948
- Medium: oil on canvas
- Location: Mulberry Hill; Melbourne
- Website: collection.nationaltrust.org.au

Girl in Red Tights (c. 1948) is a painting by Australian artist Constance Stokes. Portraying a standing girl wearing red tights, the painting was exhibited in several shows, including the Commonwealth Jubilee Exhibition in Brisbane in 1951, and Twelve Australian Artists, in London in 1953. The work attracted significant critical acclaim.

== Composition ==
Constance Stokes was a figurative painter, influenced by Post-Impressionism, and associated with Australian artist George Bell. In around 1948 she painted a work titled Girl in Red Tights. A standing girl wearing only red tights, Anne Summers recounts the circumstances under which it came to be created: "The idea for this painting had come when, arriving early one Thursday evening for her life session at George Bell's, Stokes caught the model undressing in preparation. The relatively informal and intimate nature of the pose was the result of this unexpected encounter".

== Critical reception ==
The painting was first exhibited in the Melbourne Contemporary Artists exhibition in 1949, at which it was bought by Daryl Lindsay (Director of the National Gallery of Victoria) for his personal collection. In 1951, the work was included in the Commonwealth Jubilee Exhibition, held at the then Queensland National Art Gallery. Warwick Lawrence, art critic for Brisbane's daily paper The Courier-Mail, described both the work's popularity with viewers and its quality, when he wrote of his visit to the exhibition:

But I found a double-ring around Constance Stokes "Girl in Red Tights", with its flesh tints and background bathed in warm, red glowing light, a painting of considerable artistic merit as disturbing as it is stimulating.

— Warwick Lawrence,

In 1953, a "significant" exhibition titled Twelve Australian Artists was held at the Burlington Galleries in London. The group show had also been presented at the Venice Biennale. Stokes had three works in the exhibition, which hung alongside those of Australia's most prominent twentieth-century artists, including Arthur Boyd, Russell Drysdale, William Dobell, Sidney Nolan, Lloyd Rees, Donald Friend and Frank Hinder.

It was Stokes' painting Girl in Red Tights that drew critical attention and acclaim. Admired by director of the National Gallery Sir Philip Hendy, the work was proclaimed by the art critic at The Times as the "best picture in London that week". Anne Summers reports that the critic at the Sunday Observer said "Constance Stokes imparting a glow to her monumental figures has an impressive Girl in Red Tights". The following year, Joseph Burke, Professor of Fine Arts at the University of Melbourne, praised Stokes' painting. "Constance Stokes", he wrote, was a painter who "announced the pursuit of the classical ideal as [her] aim. [Her] Girl in Red Tights, with its Venetian richness of colouring, ably sustains the monumental harmony of the classical tradition."

== Provenance ==
The work was purchased by Sir Daryl and Lady Joan Lindsay at its initial exhibition in 1949. It remained part of their personal collection at their house, "Mulberry Hill", in Langwarrin, a seaside suburb of Melbourne. Mulberry Hill and its contents – including Girl in Red Tights – were later bequethed to the National Trust of Victoria.
