= Constance Stokes =

Australian painter (1906–1991)

- Stokes in 1972
- Born: Constance Parkin; 22 February 1906; Miram, near Nhill, Victoria, Australia
- Died: 14 July 1991 (aged 85); Melbourne, Victoria, Australia
- Education: Royal Academy of Arts, London; National Gallery of Victoria Art School, Melbourne
- Known for: Painting, drawing
- Notable work: The Village (1935); Woman Drying Her Hair (c. 1946); Girl in Red Tights (c. 1948); Reverie (1950)

Constance Stokes (née Parkin, 22 February 1906 – 14 July 1991) was an Australian modernist painter who worked in Victoria. She trained at the National Gallery of Victoria Art School until 1929, winning a scholarship to continue her study at London's Royal Academy of Arts. Although Stokes painted few works in the 1930s, her paintings and drawings were exhibited from the 1940s onwards. She was one of only two women, and two Victorians, included in a major exhibition of twelve Australian artists that travelled to Canada, the United Kingdom and Italy in the early 1950s.

Influenced by George Bell, Stokes was part of the Melbourne Contemporary Artists, a group Bell established in 1940. Her works continued to be well-regarded for many years after the group's formation, in contrast to those by many of her Victorian modernist colleagues, with favourable reviews from critics such as Sir Philip Hendy in the United Kingdom and Bernard William Smith in Australia.

Her husband's early death in 1962 forced Stokes to return to painting as a career, resulting in a successful one-woman show in 1964, her first in thirty years. She continued to paint and exhibit through the 1970s and 1980s, and was the subject of a retrospective exhibition that toured Victorian regional galleries including Swan Hill Regional Art Gallery and Geelong Art Gallery in 1985. She died in 1991 and is little-known in comparison to some other women artists including Grace Cossington Smith and Clarice Beckett, but her fortunes were revived somewhat as a central figure in Anne Summers' 2009 book The Lost Mother. Her art is represented in most major Australian galleries, including the National Gallery of Australia and the National Gallery of Victoria; the Art Gallery of New South Wales is the only significant Australian collecting institution not to hold one of her works.

== Early life and training ==
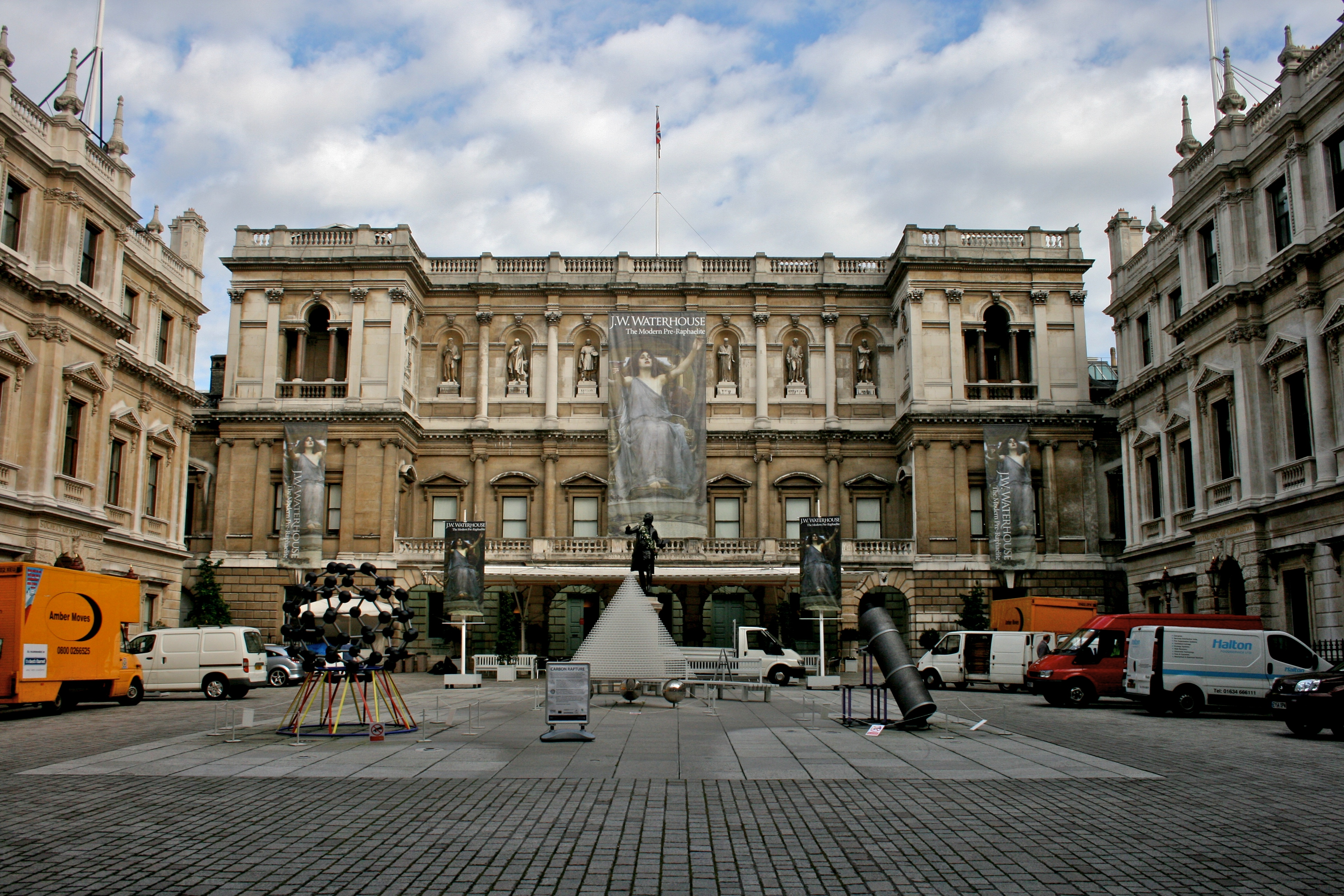
The Royal Academy at Burlington House, where Stokes studied in the 1930s, and in the galleries of which her works were exhibited in 1953

Constance Parkin was born in 1906 in the hamlet of Miram, near Nhill in western Victoria. The family moved to Melbourne in 1920, where she completed her schooling at Genazzano convent in the suburb of Kew. Constance was short, just under five feet tall, and had dark hair. She trained between 1925 and 1929 at the National Gallery of Victoria Art School in Melbourne. Over the summer of 1925–1926 the Gallery held a competition for its students, who were asked to paint "holiday subjects"; Constance won the prize for a landscape. The competition was judged by artist George Bell, who would have a continuing influence over her artistic career.

In 1930, Stokes was among artists who exhibited at a Melbourne gallery, the Athenaeum. Her painting, Portrait of Mrs. W. Mortill, was one of only two to draw praise from prominent member of the Heidelberg School, Arthur Streeton, who described the work as a "rare attraction" that was "liquid and luminous". At the end of her studies, Stokes won the National Gallery of Victoria Art School's prestigious National Gallery Travelling Scholarship, which allowed her to continue her training at the Royal Academy of Arts in London. In addition to her education at the Royal Academy, she studied under the French cubist painter and sculptor André Lhote in Paris in 1932. The following year she returned to Australia, where she married businessman Eric Stokes. The family settled in Collins Street, Melbourne, and Stokes had three children between 1937 and 1942. In later years, Stokes had a studio in the family home in Toorak, a modernist house designed by architect Edward Billson.

== Artistic career ==
=== Early career: 1934 to 1952 ===
Stokes returned from a European honeymoon in 1934, but she produced few works in the years immediately following. Although the Collins Street apartment had become a full-time studio for Stokes, only two paintings and two sketches from the period are known. The most notable is The Village (c.1933–1935), influenced, according to Stokes' own account, by the post-impressionist and portraitist Augustus John. This work was hung in the inaugural exhibition of the Contemporary Art Society, held at the National Gallery of Victoria. It was included in a travelling exhibition that appeared in New York's Metropolitan Museum of Art in 1941 and later in Canada. In 1946, Stokes presented the work to the National Gallery of Victoria.

Girl in Red Tights (1948), one of Stokes' best-known and well-regarded paintings

In the mid-twentieth century, there were divisions in the Melbourne art scene, which became intertwined with the complex cultural politics of the Cold War era. In the late 1940s, there was a move against modernism in art, and tonalism came into favour. Partly as a reaction to this development, artist George Bell established an exhibiting group called the Melbourne Contemporary Artists in 1940. Bell was a former war artist and influential member of the Victorian artistic establishment, who after World War II was appointed to teach at the National Gallery of Victoria's painting school. Influenced by Bell, Stokes was among the artists for whom modernism was a strong influence, and who exhibited with the Melbourne Contemporary Artists. Other members of the group included Russell Drysdale and Sali Herman.

Stokes' artistry endured, while that of some of her modernist colleagues did not. By 1945, when the Melbourne Contemporary Artists held one of their exhibitions, art critic Alan McCulloch observed that the works were increasingly lacking in originality and that the former standards of the group were being maintained by only a few members. One of those was Stokes, whose work The Family he praised as "strongly designed and sensitively modelled". The following year, though, McCulloch was more upbeat, describing the show as their best to date, while again complementing Stokes on her "rich and opulent pictures". Six years later, when the group exhibited in 1952, the critic for Melbourne's Argus was as unimpressed as had been McCulloch in 1945. Suggesting that the show demonstrated that Melbourne's art scene lacked innovation, he nevertheless singled out a small number of works for praise. One of these was Stokes' Christ with Simon and Andrew, which he thought showed "richness and feeling".

While Stokes was being praised at home in Melbourne, one of her portraits was among six paintings owned by the National Gallery of Victoria that were loaned for an exhibition on the other side of the country, in Perth. The city's newspaper, The West Australian, chose Stokes' picture to illustrate its story on the exhibition. Calling it Girl Drying Her Hair, the paper described the work as "notable for its patient handling, use of bright colour and skilful blending of figure and background". The National Gallery of Victoria refers to the work as Woman Drying Her Hair, (Note: Stokes in an interview also referred to her painting in the National Gallery of Victoria as The Girl Drying Her Hair. The picture in The West Australian is of the same painting that the National Gallery of Victoria refers to as Woman Drying Her Hair.) which it had acquired in 1947 at the behest of curator and artist Daryl Lindsay. It was soon to travel a great deal further than to Perth.

=== Later career: 1953 to 1989 ===
In 1953, at the request of Prime Minister Robert Menzies and the British Arts Council, an exhibition of the works of twelve Australian artists was assembled. It was shown in London, five regional British cities, and at the Venice Biennale. Of the twelve artists selected for inclusion, only two were from Victoria, the rest being from New South Wales; Stokes was one of the Victorians. Her three works, including Woman Drying Her Hair, hung alongside those of Australia's most prominent mid-twentieth-century artists, including Arthur Boyd, Russell Drysdale, William Dobell, Sidney Nolan, Lloyd Rees, Donald Friend and Frank Hinder. Despite these prominent painters being selected for inclusion, when the exhibition appeared in London, Stokes' Girl in Red Tights drew critical attention and acclaim. Admired by the director of the National Gallery Sir Philip Hendy, the work was proclaimed by the art critic at The Times as the "best picture in London that week". Some artists in Sydney were not so impressed. A meeting of the Royal Art Society of New South Wales urged Prime Minister Menzies to intervene, members describing the paintings as "the worst ever gathered in one place". However, the Commonwealth Art Advisory Board member who announced the exhibition considered that it would represent the most substantial promotion Australian art would have experienced to that time. The following year, Joseph Burke, Professor of Fine Arts at the University of Melbourne, praised Stokes' painting, making particular reference to her work that had so entranced viewers at the 1953 exhibition. "Constance Stokes", he wrote, was a painter who "announced the pursuit of the classical ideal as [her] aim. [Her] Girl in Red Tights, with its Venetian richness of colouring, ably sustains the monumental harmony of the classical tradition."

Religious subjects appear regularly in Stokes' paintings; one such work, The Baptism, is in the collection of the National Gallery of Victoria. Despite her recurring attention to such subjects, however, the artist entered the Blake Prize for Religious Art only once, in 1953. Esmond George, critic at Adelaide newspaper The Mail, admired the (unidentified) work as having "strong art interest". Stokes' interest in the Prize was not so strong as to prompt her to enter again. She told an interviewer that "abstract painting took over".

Eric Stokes died unexpectedly in 1962, an experience which left Constance bereft; a long-time friend said that she never really recovered. Faced with a substantial mortgage to service, and encouraged by Phyl Waterhouse, Stokes returned to work toward a solo show at Leveson Street Gallery. On 29 November 1964 the exhibition of over forty works opened, was favourably reviewed and sold well, so that Stokes received four thousand guineas. With the 27 paintings priced dearly, at upwards of 150 guineas, the exhibition was a success both financially and critically. The exhibition attracted praise from art historian and critic Bernard William Smith. Throughout the 1960s, 1970s and 1980s, she painted and held shows; this later phase of her work was based on a stronger, if lighter, colour palette and reflected the influence of the art of Henri Matisse, whom Stokes admired. There was also a change in her subject matter, from "classically conceived" still lifes, groups of figures and nudes, to more decorative themes. Stokes' works continued to be well received, having been included in the 1975 exhibition Australian women artists at the University of Melbourne, and the Regional Galleries Association of Victoria's 1977 touring exhibition The heroic years of Australian painting, 1940–1965. Stokes' last painting was Alice Tumbling Down the Rabbit Hole, painted around 1989; she died in Melbourne in 1991.

== Legacy ==
The standard reference work, McCulloch's Encyclopedia of Australian Art, describes Stokes as "a leading figure in the modernist movement in Victoria". Not all critics regard Stokes' work so favourably, however. Art historian Christopher Heathcote acknowledges the recognition of Stokes' work by her contemporaries, but goes on to say that "strong staff support [at Melbourne University] for a few lesser practitioners, such as Constance Stokes ... hardly aided the appreciation of the better local work." Though she appears in McCulloch's guide, few other reviews of Australian art recognise Stokes. Exceptions, according to feminist writer Anne Summers, include Ursula Hoff's Masterpieces of the National Gallery of Victoria and Janine Burke's Australian Women Artists. One Hundred Years 1840–1940, both of which refer to the well-travelled painting Woman Drying Her Hair. While academic artists and art historians such as Bernard William Smith and Joseph Burke praised Stokes' work during her lifetime, she faded into relative obscurity. There is, however, a strong secondary art market for resale of her works.

Stokes returned to some prominence through a book by Anne Summers, published in 2009, called The Lost Mother, in which Stokes and her paintings are central to a narrative about Summers' own family. Summers contrasts Stokes' ongoing obscurity with the dramatic resurrection of the oeuvre of artists Grace Cossington Smith and Clarice Beckett, both brought to attention by well-regarded gallery curators. Summers considers a number of factors to be involved in Stokes' fate, including her association with George Bell, whose destruction of many of his early pictures, propensity to keep reworking his old pieces, and artistic conservatism, all limited his subsequent reputation. Summers also points to the lack of a high-profile champion of Stokes' work, and her Melburnian identity in a time when "Sydney was where the ideas and the experimentation were and the place where reputations were made". Historian Helen Topliss takes a slightly different view, emphasising that Stokes was "deflected" from her career by raising a family.

A retrospective exhibition of Stokes' paintings toured Victorian regional galleries including Swan Hill Regional Gallery and Geelong Art Gallery in 1985. The next year, an exhibition of her work toured several state galleries and the S.H. Irvin gallery in Sydney. In 1992, her works were displayed in the National Gallery of Victoria's exhibition Classical Modernism: The George Bell Circle, while in 1993 the same gallery curated an exhibition of her paintings and drawings.

Most major Australian collections hold works by Stokes: The Village is one of thirteen in the collection of the National Gallery of Victoria. Closely associated with Victoria, and in particular the cultural milieu of Melbourne, Stokes is well represented in the galleries of that state. These include the Ballarat Fine Art Gallery, Benalla Art Gallery, Geelong Art Gallery, Mornington Peninsula Regional Gallery, and Swan Hill Regional Gallery. Other public galleries holding works by Stokes include the National Gallery of Australia, the Art Gallery of South Australia, the Museum and Art Gallery of the Northern Territory, and the Queensland Art Gallery. The Art Gallery of New South Wales is alone among the major Australian institutions in not holding any of her paintings or drawings.
