= John Timothy Stone =

American clergyman

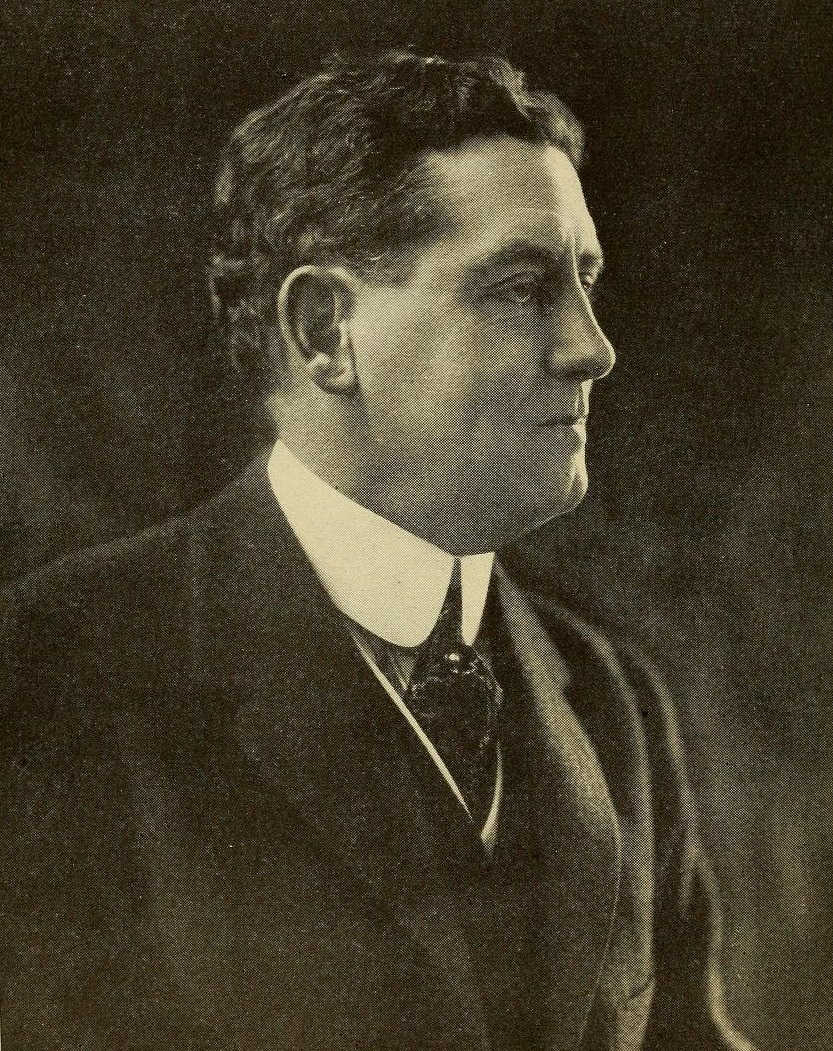
- Born: 1868; Boston, Massachusetts
- Died: 1954 (aged 85–86)
- Notable work: Footsteps in a Parish (1908) Recruiting for Christ (1910) Everyday Religion (1927) A Prayer to Begin the Day (1928)
- Title: Moderator of the 125th General Assembly of the Presbyterian Church.
- Predecessor: Mark A. Matthews
- Successor: Maitland Alexander

John Timothy Stone (1868–1954) was an American Presbyterian clergyman.

== Biography ==
He was born in Boston and graduated from Amherst College (1891) and from Auburn Theological Seminary (1894). He was pastor of churches at Utica and Cortland, New York, until 1900; then of the Brown Memorial Presbyterian Church, Baltimore, until 1909; and in that year became pastor of the Fourth Presbyterian Church, Chicago. In 1913–14 he was moderator of the 125th General Assembly of the Presbyterian Church.

== Writings ==
- Footsteps in a Parish (1908)
- Recruiting for Christ (1910)
- Everyday Religion (1927)
- A Prayer to Begin the Day (1928)

He also wrote monographs on educational and religious subjects.

Religious titles
Preceded by Mark A. Matthews	Moderator of the General Assembly of the Presbyterian Church in the United States of America; 1913–1914	Succeeded by Maitland Alexander
