= Moody's Pub =

1941 painting by Russell Drysdale

- Artist: Russell Drysdale
- Year: 1941
- Type: oil on plywood
- Dimensions: 50.9 cm × 61.4 cm (20.0 in × 24.2 in)
- Location: National Gallery of Victoria; Melbourne

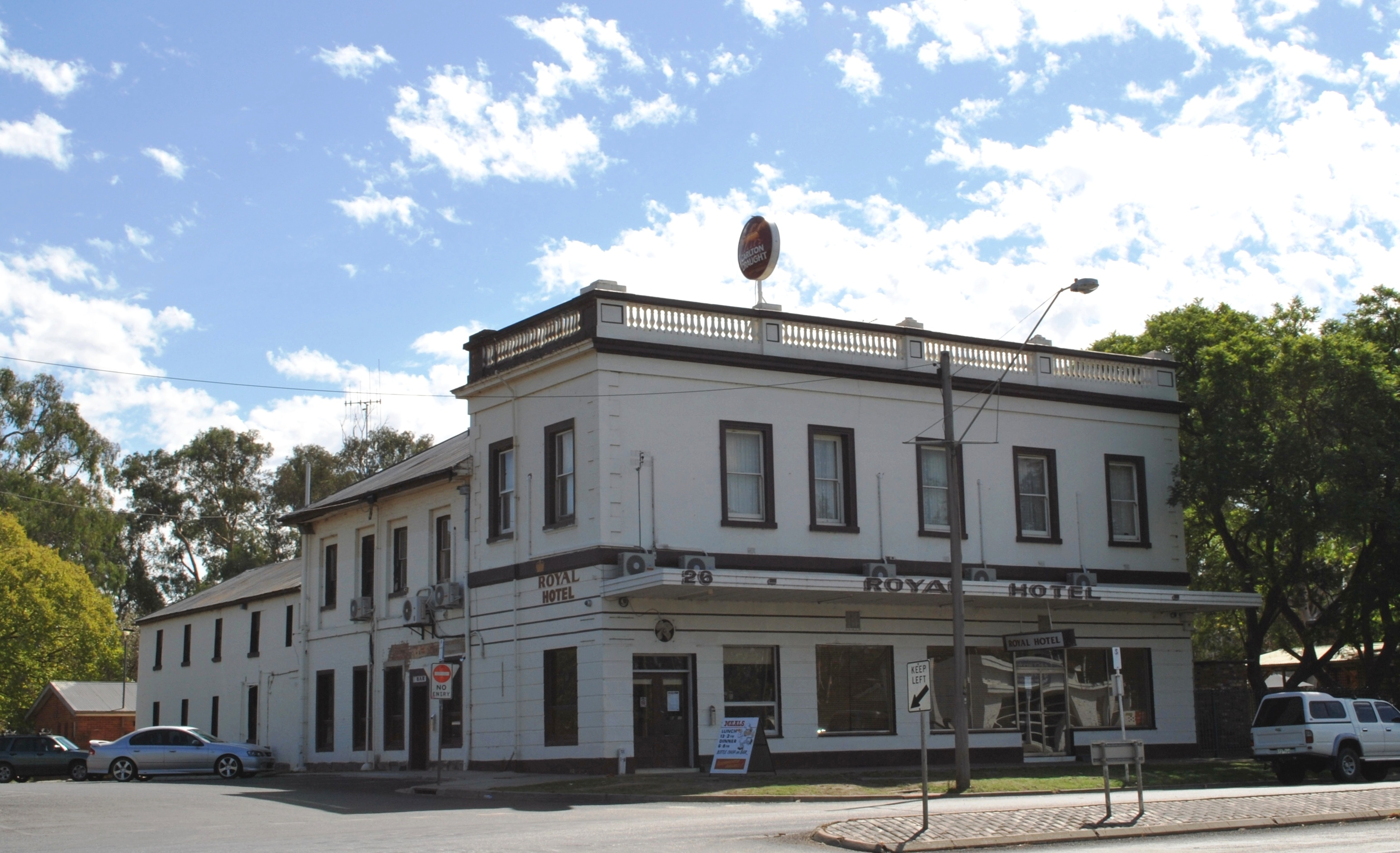
The Royal Hotel in Seymour seen in 2009, the model for Drysdale's work

Moody's Pub is a 1941 painting by Australian artist Russell Drysdale. The painting depicts a pub in the Victorian town of Seymour.

The painting has been described as "one of Drysdale's most celebrated paintings and among the most frequently reproduced images of twentieth-century Australian art."

The National Gallery of Victoria acquired the work in 1942; its first acquisition of a Drysdale painting.
