= Childhaven =

US nonprofit organization

Coordinates: 47.604749°N 122.320609°W

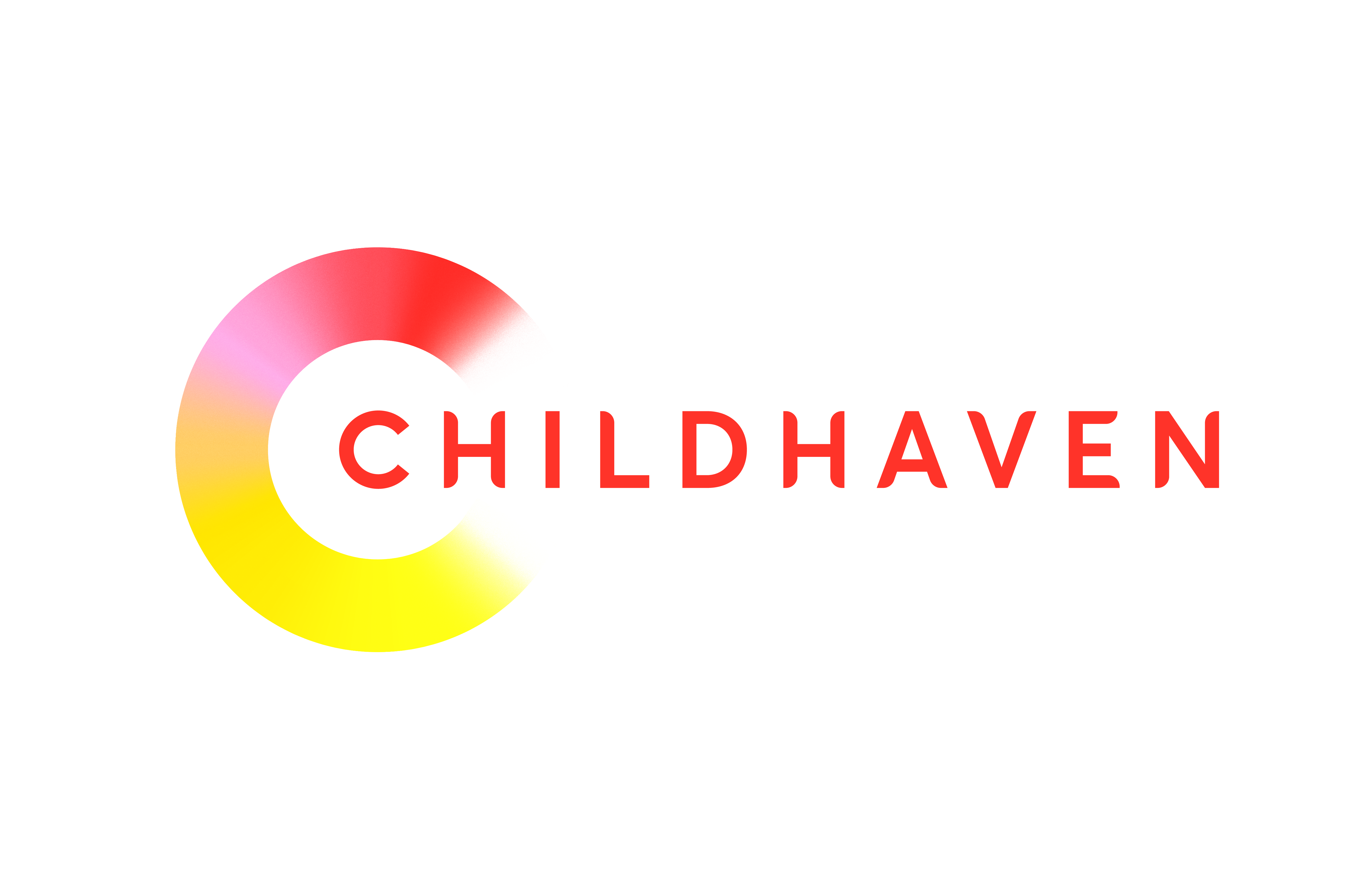
Childhaven Logo

Childhaven is a nonprofit organization that serves children (0–13 years) and their families who have experienced adversity and trauma in King County, Washington, United States. The agency runs several programs: Early Learning, Counseling Services, Developmental Therapies, and Wraparound Support. Childhaven provides support through a Healing Centered Framework that embeds relational health, trauma-informed care, and social justice in all places in which children and families live, learn, and play.

The agency encompasses three branches: the Broadway Branch in First Hill, the Eli Creekmore Memorial Branch in Burien, and the Patrick L. Gogerty Branch in Auburn. In addition to other in-state organizations, agencies in South Carolina and Calgary have imitated Childhaven's model.

== History ==
Childhaven was founded in 1909 by the Reverend Mark A. Matthews. Its original name was Seattle Day Nursery, and at the time it was one of only 50 child-care centers in the U.S. The agency's original nursery building was constructed in 1921 in Seattle's First Hill neighborhood; today, the site is home to Childhaven's Broadway Center, which was completed in 2004 thanks to the Capital Campaign, which raised $15.5 million.

In 1965 Childhaven was the first organization to bring Head Start to the west coast, providing a year-round preschool program to help prepare young children for school.

Seattle Day Nursery's name and purpose transformed following a shift in leadership that started in 1973. That year, Patrick Gogerty became the organization's executive director, and he soon changed its focus, establishing the Therapeutic Child Care Program in 1977 with 10 children. This occurred two years before Washington state made the reporting of child abuse mandatory. Under Gogerty's guidance, the agency began to garner national acclaim; in 1984, it was featured in Life magazine. The following year, Seattle Day Nursery was formally renamed Childhaven.

That same year, Congress threatened to cut off Childhaven's funding. Gogerty enlisted the help of his friend Rep. Jim McDermott, who brought the Life article to a House session and told the story of a specific child the agency had rescued. Persuaded, Congress continued to provide funding for Childhaven's work. Before Gogerty retired in March 1998, The Seattle Times published an editorial lauding his achievements; its headline was "Fighting for Kids Unable to Fight for Themselves."

Childhaven celebrated its centennial in 2009.

== See also ==
- Child counseling
- Child development
