= Harry Brauner =

Romanian musician and musicologist (1908–1988)

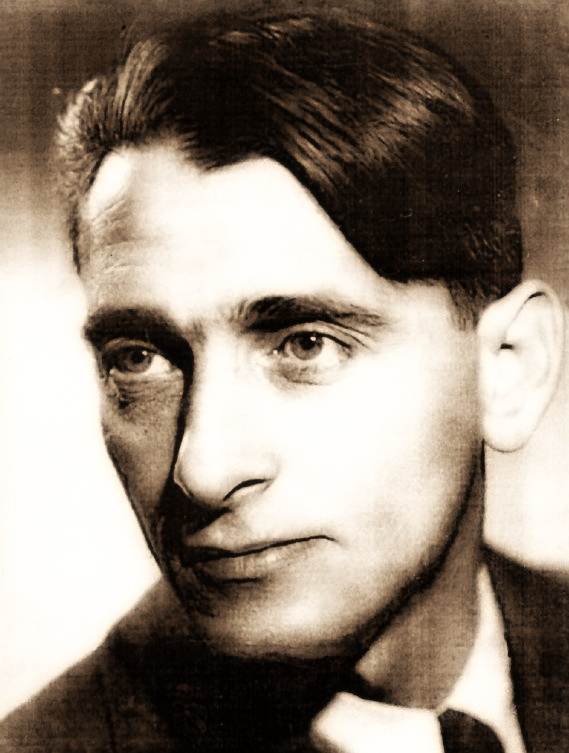
Harry Brauner

Harry Brauner (24 February 1908 - 11 March 1988) was a Romanian ethnomusicologist, composer, and professor of music.

== Life ==
Brauner was born in Piatra Neamț into a Jewish family with many children, including his elder brother, Victor, who became a noted painter and sculptor of the Surrealist movement. He moved in 1913 to Vienna with his family, where they stayed for two years. When they returned to Romania, they lived first in Brăila, and later in Bucharest. There he studied at the Music Academy, having as teachers, among others, Constantin Brăiloiu, Dumitru Georgescu Kiriac, and Ștefan Popescu. In 1927, he was named secretary of the Composers' Society's so-called Folklore Archives.

Brauner was one of those who discovered Romanian folk music diva Maria Tănase in the mid-1930s. He eventually became her official biographer.

During World War II, he was a teacher at a Jewish high school in Bucharest, in 1944 he became music adviser at the Romanian Radio Broadcasting Company in charge of folklore, and in 1949 he became head of the Folklore Department at the Music Academy in Bucharest.

Brauner was implicated in the show trial against Lucrețiu Pătrășcanu, and spent 12 years in prison, most of it in solitary confinement. He was released from Aiud Prison in January 1962, sent into internal exile to a village near Slobozia. He married Lena Constante in 1964. In 1966, he was allowed to travel to the Venice Biennale, Italy, where his brother Victor Brauner exhibited some of his works at the French pavilion.

In 1967, after being named a member of the Paris Music Biennale, he was allowed to travel to Paris, where he became acquainted with Marc Chagall. In 1968, both he and Lena Constante were rehabilitated and given a meager pension for their sufferings.

A close collaborator of Constantin Brăiloiu, Brauner recorded about 5,000 Romanian folk songs. He died in 1988 in Bucharest.

== Books ==
- 1979. Să auzi iarba cum crește ("To Hear How the Grass Grows"). Bucharest: Editura Eminescu
