= The Cricketers (Drysdale) =

1948 painting by Russell Drysdale

- Artist: Russell Drysdale
- Year: 1948
- Medium: oil on canvas
- Dimensions: 76 cm × 101.5 cm (30 in × 40.0 in)
- Location: Private collection

The Cricketers is a 1948 painting by the Australian artist Russell Drysdale. The painting depicts three boys set among the buildings in an empty town; two playing cricket and the other watching them. The National Gallery of Australia describes the painting as "one of the most original and haunting images in all Australian art." The Sydney Morning Herald said the work is "possibly the most famous Australian painting of the 20th century."

== History ==
The painting was commissioned by Walter Hutchinson, an English publisher, for his own collection, known as the "National Collection of British Sports and Pastimes". Looking for a picture of an Australian cricket match, Hutchinson asked his Melbourne office to commission a well-known Australian artist for this purpose. Leonard Voss Smith, the Hutchinson Australasian manager and art collecto spoke to Drysdale who was then painting in the town of Hill End in the Central West region of New South Wales. Drysdale accepted the commission, worth £150.

When complete, Voss Smith sent Drysdale's work through to Hutchinson in England. Hutchinson was shocked, the painting was nothing like what he had expected. Immediately Hutchinson sent a telegram back to Melbourne, firing Smith. The next day Hutchinson reconsidered and rehired Voss Smith, after satisfying himself that Drysdale was a respected artist in Australia.

The painting, valued in 2004 at A$6,000,000, is now owned by JGL Investments, a Melbourne-based investment company. It was last on public exhibition in 1998.

== Composition and legacy ==
The painting was a departure from earlier artistic visions of Australia with a Sydney Morning Herald review noting "Drysdale’s large composition of 'cricketers' under leaden skies in the wide open spaces of burning sands dramatises the 'outback' as it has never been dramatised before." The National Gallery of Australia claim that the work "succeeds as art by abandoning any pretence to illustrative realism."

The model for the batsman was Teddy Woolard and Roy Holloway was the model for the bowler. In 1996, after the models were identified, Woolard was asked for his opinion of Drysdale's portrayal; "I just don't rate it ... It makes us all look out of proportion."

The town of Hill End itself is not as desolate as shown in the painting, with a later visitor to Hill End remarking "Even the scattered buildings—so blank and menacing in The Cricketers—appear as if ripped from the cover of a chocolate box."
