= We Heart Seattle =

Volunteer organization

We Heart Seattle (WHS), formerly We Heart Downtown Seattle and incorporated as I Heart Downtown Seattle in October 2020, is a volunteer organization responding to trash and homelessness in Seattle. Its founder and executive director is Andrea Suarez, a resident of Seattle's Belltown neighborhood. The group organizes volunteer trash cleanups in public parks in which homeless people have established camps, primarily through a public Facebook group and Facebook events. The group had a short-lived affiliate, We Heart Portland, which performed similar work in Portland, Oregon.

== Outreach work ==
From October 2020 to March 2021, WHS organized trash cleanup events at Denny Park, as well as other parks around the city. In March 2021 the city of Seattle subsequently "swept" the park, removing all homeless persons and their belongings from the premises. In May, one former Denny Park resident credited WHS with helping her and her partner get into an apartment, but others who returned to the park said nobody had offered them housing assistance.

We Heart Seattle began offering assistance to people camping in parks, and in late April 2021, WHS announced an intention to provide support, services, and housing options to residents of an encampment near Broadview-Thomson K-8 School in Seattle's Bitter Lake neighborhood. Suarez described WHS's model as "daily intensive outreach". Erica C. Barnett reported that Suarez's actions at the encampment included photography and videography of the conditions and offers to take residents to facilities such as Bybee Lakes Hope Center, a homeless shelter in Portland, Oregon. Real Change interviewed a resident of the camp who described Suarez's typical routine as walking around for roughly 30 minutes, taking photos or videos, offering to pick up trash, and giving interviews to news reporters about the state of encampments.

In May 2021, the South Seattle Emerald reported that Suarez had personally driven at least one homeless resident from a Seattle park to Bybee Lakes. The facility’s director at that time, Jeff Woodward, was also a member of We Heart Seattle’s board of directors.

In November 2021, WHS made news for its outreach to Charles Woodward, a homeless man in Ballard nicknamed the "Lawnmower Man" for his collection of equipment. WHS had helped Woodward, who was at odds with the community for about a year, to leave the neighborhood when the city services were unable to assist. In February 2022, Woodward was back living on another street in the same neighborhood. Suarez said that there were problems with the housing they got him and that Woodward was now working for We Heart Seattle, driving a truck and making $22 an hour. Councilmember Strauss stated publicly "When people are moved around the neighborhood without addressing their housing needs, their behaviors remain the same, just in a new place. The outcome … is what I worried might happen." As of October 2022, Suarez reported that Woodward had chosen to move to family in Arizona.

In October 2022, We Heart Seattle volunteers stopped an attack in a tent near a cleanup site and assisted the victim by driving her to a tiny house village.

== Work with city governments ==
In November 2021, Suarez reported that in a conference call with City Councilmember Dan Strauss and "at least 10 other city leaders", she was told that WHS and its efforts were "disruptive and confusing" to homeless outreach efforts by the city and they were asked to stop their activities in parks. On the Dori Monson Show, Suarez said that the group had permission from homeless camps to remove trash, and characterized WHS's work as "a form of protest for a more beautiful and clean Seattle". She criticized city policies that prevent immediate destruction of all possessions in a park and suggested that city safety policies and union work rules are preventing any progress in cleaning up city streets. With support from some local businesses, WHS volunteers continued collecting and disposing of trash in Ballard.

In April 2022, WHS applied to participate in Seattle mayor Bruce Harrell's inaugural One Seattle Day of Service but were not approved. They did participate in 2023 and 2024.

== Reactions ==
Jason Rantz, writing nationally for Fox News, praised WHS for doing "more to address the problems at Denny Park than the city has done in years.".

A Seattle Times opinion columnist praised We Heart Seattle for taking responsibility and being active in cleaning up the city in November 2021, and in December 2021, Suarez was included in a Seattle Times editorial praising "people who have contributed to making our region a better place in 2021."

Mutual aid groups have criticized We Heart Seattle and Suarez for actions that they say are harmful to the homeless communities in parks where We Heart Seattle holds cleanup events. Critics draw attention to Suarez's lack of formal training and licensing, citing the difficulty that case workers have in establishing trust with vulnerable populations. In an inquiry from KIRO-FM on whether she had formal licensing, Suarez responded "I don’t know, did Jesus Christ have a license?" At a cleanup in January 2021, a park resident observed Suarez recommending that people pick up a bag of garbage in exchange for food although the community kitchen cooking at the event had no such requirement. They also observed Suarez comparing campers to "rats and dogs." Suarez later acknowledged the negative impact of her statements and apologized for early missteps. At another cleanup event, people observed a WHS volunteer entering a tent that had belonged to a homeless person. Suarez disavowed the actions of the volunteer, who apologized on social media. Seattle City Council members Tammy Morales and Andrew Lewis publicly distanced themselves from WHS; Lewis, who had previously met with WHS, told KOMO News that he does not condone private groups conducting trash cleanups.

In 2024, KIRO-FM ran a multi-part documentary named "In Plain Sight" covering WHS, following a WHS discovery of decomposing human remains. The documentary highlighted controversy surrounding the organization, but also drew attention to the lack of discovery of said remains by official city staff. The remains were described by the discoverer, Kodi Pickett, as "fully decomposed," with city officials responding their crews are not allowed on "steep slopes" due to union agreements and they instead rely on contractors. The documentary also featured interviews with several individuals who work in homelessness advocacy, as well as some current and formerly homeless individuals. Local advocacy group YouthCare's Director of Marketing Pascha Scott describes an event in 2021 where Suarez arrived at a facility of theirs, claiming to be a case worker. A dispute over her legitimacy as a caseworker resulted in facility staff asking her to step outside to preserve privacy, which Suarez interpreted as being kicked out. A local resident, William Hughes, who was formerly homeless described run ins with WHS and Suarez multiple times as hostile and lacking accountability; “[Suarez] walks by this one tent and she goes, ‘Wow, that tent is — ‘ and just steps on it, and says, ‘Yeah, that’s trash.'...It was our friend’s tent. He wasn’t there for a couple of days because he had to go do some things.” Suarez dismissed all criticism as "manufactured controversy" and "a middle school playground set of accusations that has nothing to do with the real work."

== Impact ==
As of August 2021 the group claims to have collected more than 150,000 pounds of trash and housed dozens of unsheltered people.

As of May 2022, WHS claimed to have transported three Seattle residents and 13 Portland residents to Bybee Lakes. By August 30, 2022, the offshoot group We Heart Portland claimed to have helped 150 homeless people find resources and housing.

== Kevin Dahlgren (former president) ==
Kevin Dahlgren, a homelessness services worker in Gresham and social media personality was named president of We Heart Seattle in April 2022 and was also chapter leader of the Portland branch. He resigned his presidency in early 2023 to focus on his work in Gresham. Dahlgren was indicted on October 31, 2023, on charges of theft, identity theft, and official misconduct for multiple incidents in 2020 and 2021. Dahlgren pleaded guilty to those charges in January 2025. Dahlgren purchased personal items with city procurement card under the guise of supplies purchased to be given to people and filled out receipt with fabricated identities with intent to deceive. We Heart Seattle's president as of November 2023, Andrea Suarez, said that neither she nor We Heart Seattle's board had any direct knowledge of the facts related to the charges against Dahlgren.
