= Mark A. Matthews =

American Presbyterian minister (1867–1940)

Matthews in 1927

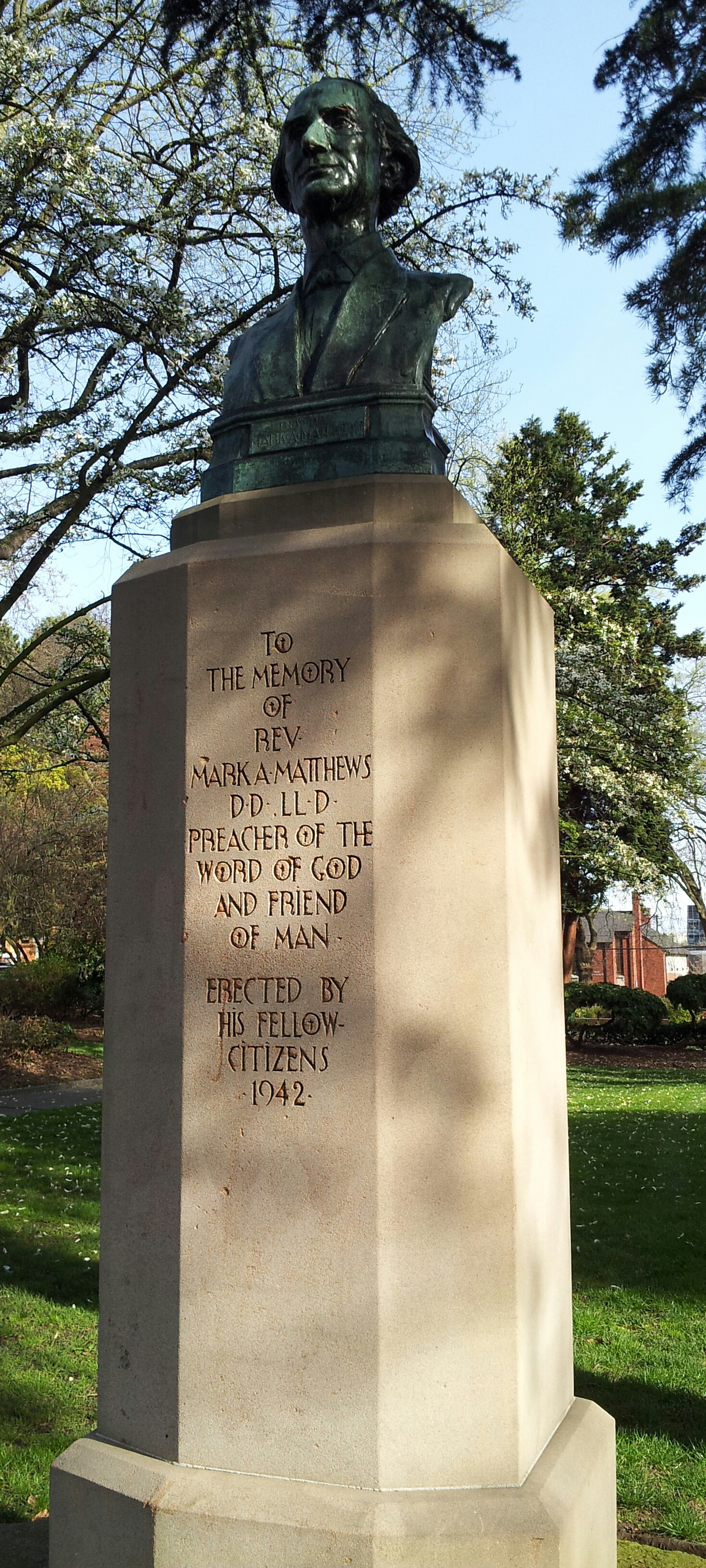
Bust of Matthews in Seattle's Denny Park

Mark A. Matthews (September 24, 1867 – 1940) was a Presbyterian minister in Seattle, Washington, from 1902 until his death. He was a leading city reformer, who investigated red light districts and crime scenes, denouncing corrupt politicians businessmen and saloon keepers. With 10,000 members, his was the largest Presbyterian Church in the country, and he was selected the national moderator in 1912. He built a model church, with night schools, unemployment bureaus, kindergarten, an anti-tuberculosis clinic, and the nation's first church-owned radio station. Matthews was the most influential clergymen in the Pacific Northwest, and one of the most active Social Gospelers in America. He was an enigmatic figure, holding views in common with both Christian fundamentalists and liberals, especially the Social Gospel movement. He battled corruption (especially in the person of Seattle mayor Hiram Gill) and encouraged social services. There is a statue of him in Seattle's Denny Park.

In line with his Progressive leanings, Matthews was an advocate of the Temperance movement. In his writings, he extended the Temperance platform of abstinence from alcohol to include other vices and associated institutions. He is quoted as saying, "The saloon is the most fiendish, corrupt, hell-soaked institution that ever crawled out of the slime of the eternal pit. ... It takes your sweet innocent daughter, robs her of her virtue, and transforms her into a brazen, wanton harlot.... It is the open sore of this land".

Unusually for a prohibitionist, Matthews opposed women's suffrage. He was one of the few opponents of Washington's women's suffrage movement during their 1910 campaign to restore women's right to vote statewide. In one of his sermons Matthews said: "This country will never adopt female suffrage. If the ballot were extended to the women the star of America's glory would go down immediately, never to rise again." However, the campaign succeeded, and women regained the right to vote in Washington on November 8, 1910. Matthews also supported limitations on the immigration of Asians.

Born in Calhoun, Georgia, in a family beset by Reconstruction era poverty, Matthews grew up in the environment of Southern revivalism and, later, post-Reconstruction radical agrarian politics. His religious education was largely informal, but by 1886, at age 19, he was a preacher, first in Georgia and later in Tennessee. In 1902, he moved to Seattle to become pastor of the First Presbyterian Church. He married Grace Jones in 1904; they were to have two children, Gwladys and Mark Jr. As pastor from 1902 to 1940, Matthews built his church into the country's largest Presbyterian church; at its height, it had 10,000 members. He helped create such institutions as Harborview Medical Center and the organization that began as the Seattle Day Nursery and is now Childhaven, an institution to treat child abuse. He established KTW Radio in 1922, the first church-owned radio station in the U.S. First Presbyterian also spun out branch churches, including University Presbyterian Church, which continues to be a major institution to this day.

== See also ==
- Dr. Mark A. Matthews (1941), Denny Park, Seattle

== Notes ==
Religious titles
Preceded by John F. Carson	Moderator of the General Assembly of the Presbyterian Church in the United States of America; 1912–1913	Succeeded by John Timothy Stone
