= Bust of Mark A. Matthews =

Sculpture in Seattle, Washington, U.S.

Dr. Mark A. Matthews
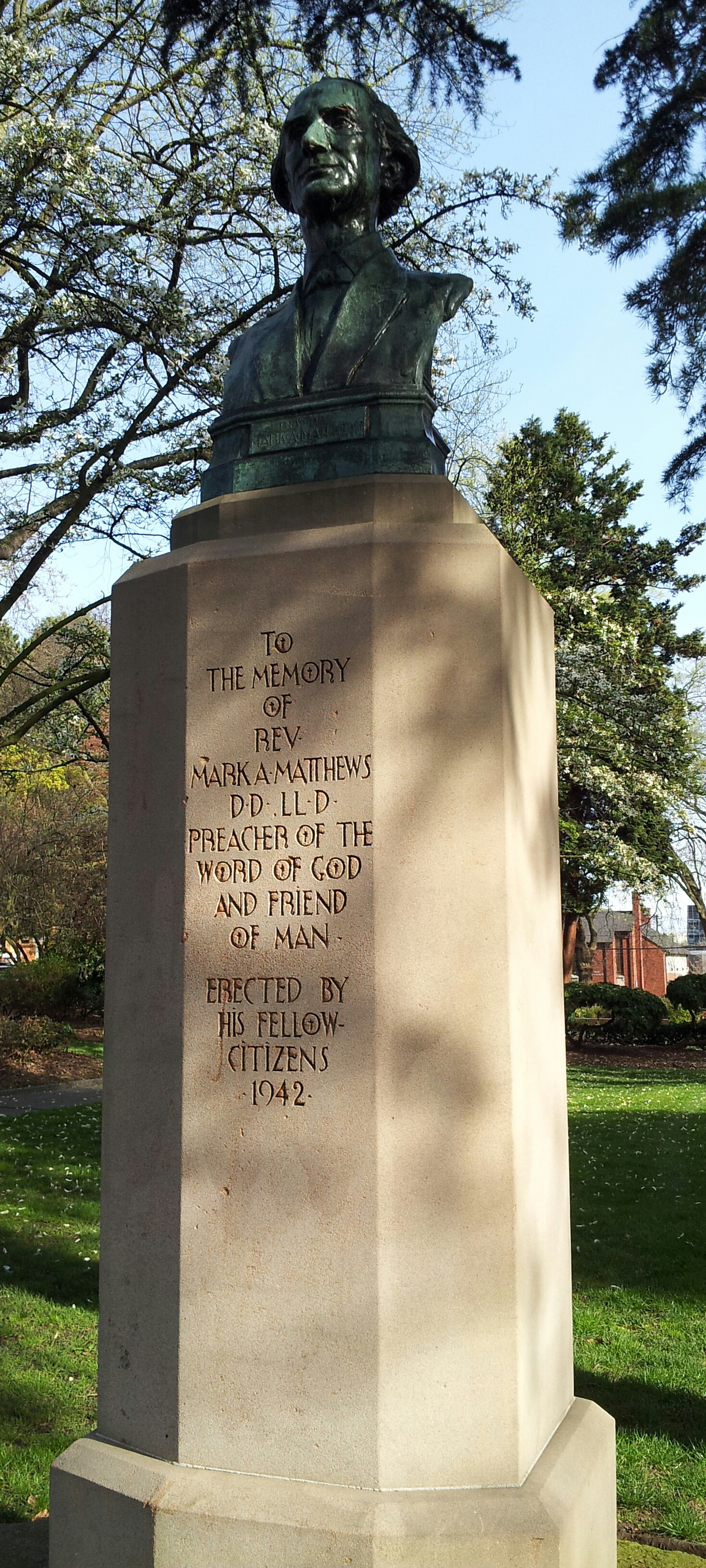
- The bust in 2014
- Artist: Alonzo Victor Lewis
- Year: 1941; 85 years ago
- Type: Sculpture
- Medium: Bronze, stone
- Subject: Mark A. Matthews
- Condition: "Treatment urgent" (1994)
- Location: Seattle, Washington, United States; 47.618667°N 122.341083°W

Dr. Mark A. Matthews is an outdoor 1941 bust depicting the minister and city reformer of the same name by Alonzo Victor Lewis, installed in Seattle's Denny Park, in the U.S. state of Washington.

== Description ==
The cast bronze sculpture is approximately 3.5 feet (1.1 m) tall. It rests on a stone pedestal and base that measures approximately 85 inches (220 cm) tall. An inscription on the front of the best, near the base, reads: REV.DR / MARK.A.MATTHEWS. The bronze plaque on the back of the base reads: ALONZO VICTOR LEWIS / -SCULPTOR-. The front of the base displays the text: TO / THE MEMORY / OF / REV. / MARK A. MATTHEWS / D.D, LL.D / PREACHER OF THE / WORD OF GOD / AND FRIEND / OF MAN / ERECTED BY / HIS FELLOW CITIZENS / 1942.

== History ==
The memorial was designed in 1941 and dedicated the following year. It was surveyed and deemed "treatment urgent" by the Smithsonian Institution's "Save Outdoor Sculpture!" program in October 1994.

== See also ==
- 1941 in art
