= Swan Hill Regional Art Gallery =

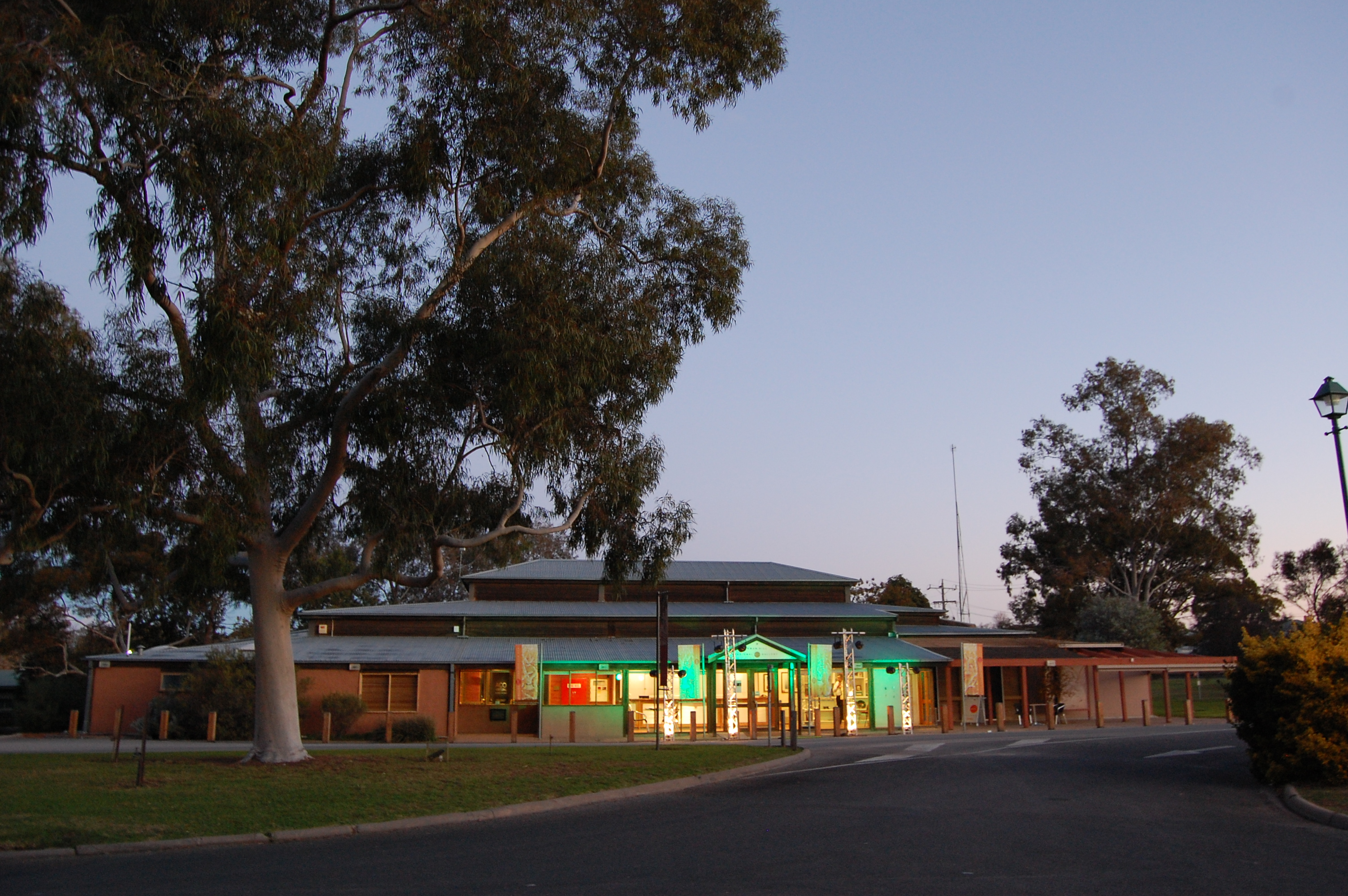
- Established: 1966
- Location: Horseshoe Bend, Swan Hill, Victoria
- Coordinates: 35°20′58″S 143°33′52″E
- Type: Art gallery
- Website: gallery.swanhill.vic.gov.au

Swan Hill Regional Art Gallery is a public art gallery in the regional Victorian city of Swan Hill.

Swan Hill Regional Art Gallery is a public gallery, established in 1966. It opened in its current building, designed by Australian architect Ian Douglas, in 1987. In 2013, expansion plans were announced, including a proposed increase in teaching workshop space.

Artists whose work is held by the gallery include Constance Stokes, John Brack, Ray Crooke, Pro Hart, Kenneth Jack, Mary Macqueen, Sidney Nolan, Andrew Sibley, Ernest Trova and a number of local artists.

The gallery is a member of the Public Galleries Association of Victoria.
