= The Great Sirens =

1947 painting by Paul Delvaux

- Artist: Paul Delvaux
- Year: 1947
- Medium: Oil on masonite
- Dimensions: 201.9 cm × 309.9 cm (79 1/2 in × 122 in)
- Location: Metropolitan Museum of Art; New York
- Accession: 1979.356

The Great Sirens (French: Les grandes sirènes) is a large 1947 painting by the Belgian painter Paul Delvaux in the collection of the Metropolitan Museum of Art, in New York.

== Subject and composition ==
The picture depicts a group of partially nude women in moonlight, sitting motionless before a hill bearing two Greco-Roman style buildings. According to the description from the Metropolitan Museum of Art, the setting "reveals the painter's admiration of the work of Giorgio de Chirico". The women in the foreground are unashamedly if not threateningly seductive, and in the distance mermaids are working their magic on a lone individual in a bowler hat. The whole composition evokes fantasies of erotic love.

== Provenance ==
The painting was first exhibited at the Galerie René Drouin in Paris on 5 March 1948. It was bought by the dramatist Claude Spaak in 1949, after which it was sold several times to different collectors in Brussels. The American music producer Jean Aberbach bought it in 1967. He then traded it with his brother Julian Aberbach, who wanted this painting and works by René Magritte in exchange for some sculptures by Alberto Giacometti. Julian Aberbach gave The Great Sirens to the Metropolitan Museum of Art in 1979.
