= Vladimír Novák (painter) =

Czech painter (1947–2024)

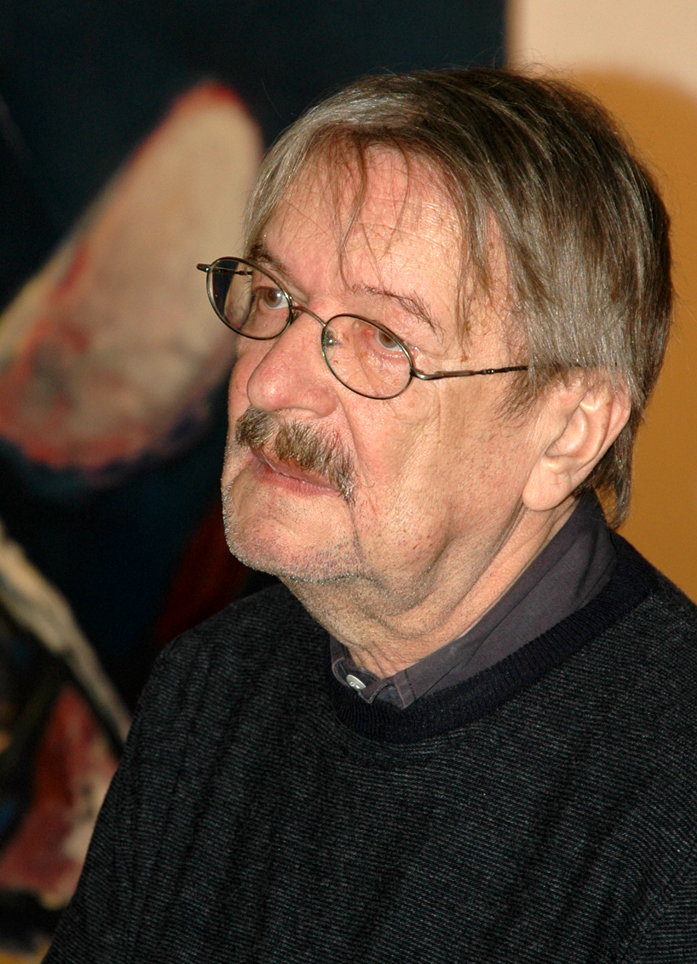
- Born: 30 April 1947; Louny, Czechoslovakia
- Died: 23 July 2024 (aged 77)
- Education: Academy of Fine Arts, Prague
- Occupations: Painter, visual artist, graphic artist, illustrator

Vladimír Novák (30 April 1947 – 23 July 2024) was a Czech painter.

== Biography ==
Novák was born in Louny on 30 April 1947. He studied at the Prague Academy of Fine Arts. Novák was a member of the art group 12/15: Better Late Than Never. He lived in Prague and Milan, and was married to Italian writer Serena Vitale.

Novák died on 23 July 2024, at the age of 77.

== Work ==
Novak was from a generation of artists who began studying at art schools in the liberal atmosphere of the end of the 1960s, but which fully emerged on the art scene in about the mid-1970s, during the Normalization period, during which Czech artists were prevented from making contact with the foreign art world.

In about the mid 1980s, Novák's paintings became more radical, moving from tranquil and reflective works to aggressive, colourful expressions of concentrated emotion, coinciding with the emergence of a new wave in the Czech art.

== Exhibitions ==
Novák took part in many solo and group exhibitions. The most famous were the exhibitions "Man in the Wind" at the Ball-Game Hall in the Royal Gardens of Prague Castle in 1999 and "Quasiretro" at the Manes Art Gallery in Prague in 2005.

== Represented in collections ==
- National Gallery in Prague
- Prague City Gallery
- Museum of Fine Arts in Prague
- Aleš South Bohemian Gallery in Hluboká nad Vltavou
- Art Gallery in Karlovy Vary
