= Hommage à Marcel Duchamp =

1947 painting by Victor Brauner

- Artist: Victor Brauner
- Year: 1947
- Medium: oil paint on canvas
- Movement: Surrealism
- Dimensions: 92 cm × 72 cm (36 in × 28 in)
- Location: Unterlinden Museum, Colmar
- Accession: 2003

Hommage à Marcel Duchamp is a June 1947 oil painting by the Romanian artist Victor Brauner, today in the collection of the Unterlinden Museum in Colmar, Alsace (inventory number 2003.2.1). Painted shortly before the last great international surrealist exhibition, organized at the Galerie Maeght by André Breton and Marcel Duchamp, Brauner's close friend at that time, it is a celebration of sorts of the latter's creative genius.
