= Henry Orlik =

British painter (b. 1947)

- Born: January 6, 1947 (age 79); Ankum, Germany
- Known for: Painting, Draughtsmanship
- Style: Surrealism
- Movement: Surrealism
- Patrons: Grant Ford

Henry Orlik (born 6 January 1947) is a German-born British painter of Polish and Belorussian heritage.

Orlik was born in Ankum, Germany. Heralded as a young man as a talented draughtsman and surrealist who was exhibited alongside such painters as Salvador Dali, René Magritte, and Francis Picabia, he turned his back on the art world which he believed was populated by greedy art dealers.

Many years later, his work was rediscovered by art dealer Antiques Road Show and former Sotheby's expert Grant Ford.

In the meantime, he had suffered the loss of several dozen paintings from his council flat after having to be hospitalised following a stroke.

Ford organized and helped mount a series of exhibitions of Orlik's work in England and New York, including at the Maas Gallery in London, and sales were hearty.
