= Sofala (Drysdale) =

1947 painting by Russell Drysdale

- Artist: Russell Drysdale
- Year: 1947
- Medium: oil on canvas on hardboard
- Dimensions: 71.7 cm × 93.1 cm (28.2 in × 36.7 in)
- Location: Art Gallery of New South Wales, Sydney

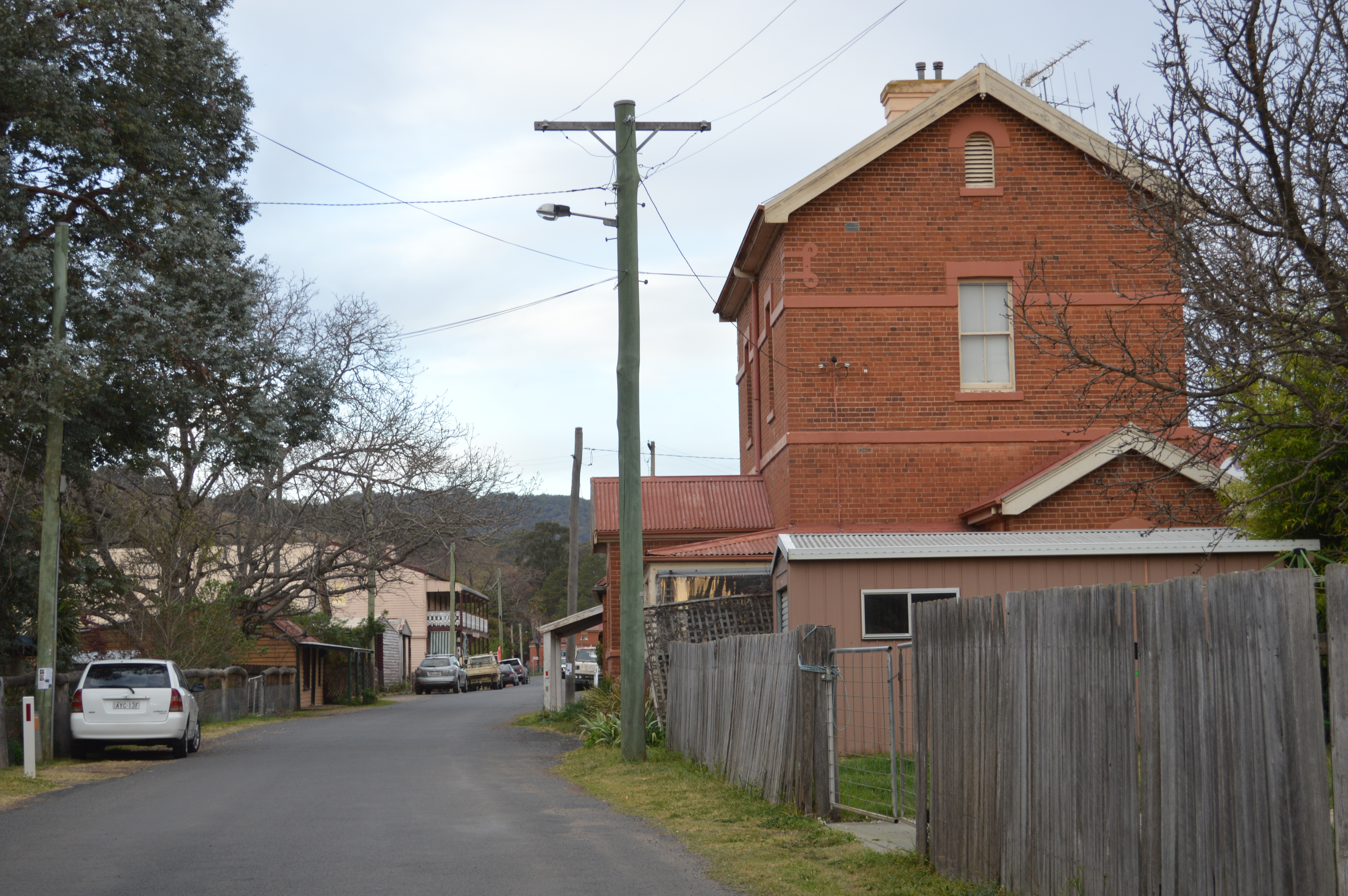
The same street depicted in the painting, as seen in 2015

Sofala is a 1947 painting by Australian artist Russell Drysdale. The painting depicts the main street of the New South Wales town of Sofala. The painting won the Wynne Prize for 1947. The Art Gallery of New South Wales describe the work as "one of [his] finest paintings, representing the artist at the height of his powers." and that "the painting transcends literal description of a particular place to become an expression of the quintessential qualities of an inland Australian country town".

Drysdale painted the work after a trip in 1947 with fellow painter Donald Friend to the country around Bathurst, including the villages of Hill End and Sofala. In Sofala, Drysdale made some sketches of the main street and took some photographs. On return to Sydney, both Friend and Drysdale worked on a painting of the main street. Friend said of Drysdale:

[Drysdale], in a frenzy of painting, unusual for him, worked on the final stages of his picture of Sofala's main street which he has been painting every day since last weekend. It is very good and makes my own picture...look pretty foolish, shallow and flimsy.

— Donald Friend,

The painting was exhibited in the Macquarie Galleries in December 1947. During this exhibition, Hal Missingham—Director of the Art Gallery of New South Wales—nominated the painting for the Wynne Prize. The awarding of the Prize to Sofala "marked a dramatic move away from the traditional pastoral imagery of Australian landscape painting". Following the award the art critic for the Sydney Morning Herald said of the work:

Russell Drysdale's beautifully modulated "Sofala" deserves the prize. In the heat of a late afternoon, the stifling air red with dust, the main road empty of life, he conveys a difficult and lonely existence, where man constantly battles against the elements.

— Sydney Morning Herald,

The painting was originally purchased by John Stephen, Drysdale's brother-in-law. It was acquired in 1952 by the Art Gallery of New South Wales in Sydney.

Several of the buildings in the painting can still be seen in Denison St, Sofala, including the Royal Hotel in the left foreground and the former hospital in the middle distance.
