= Denny Park =

City park in SLU neighborhood, Seattle, Washington, USA

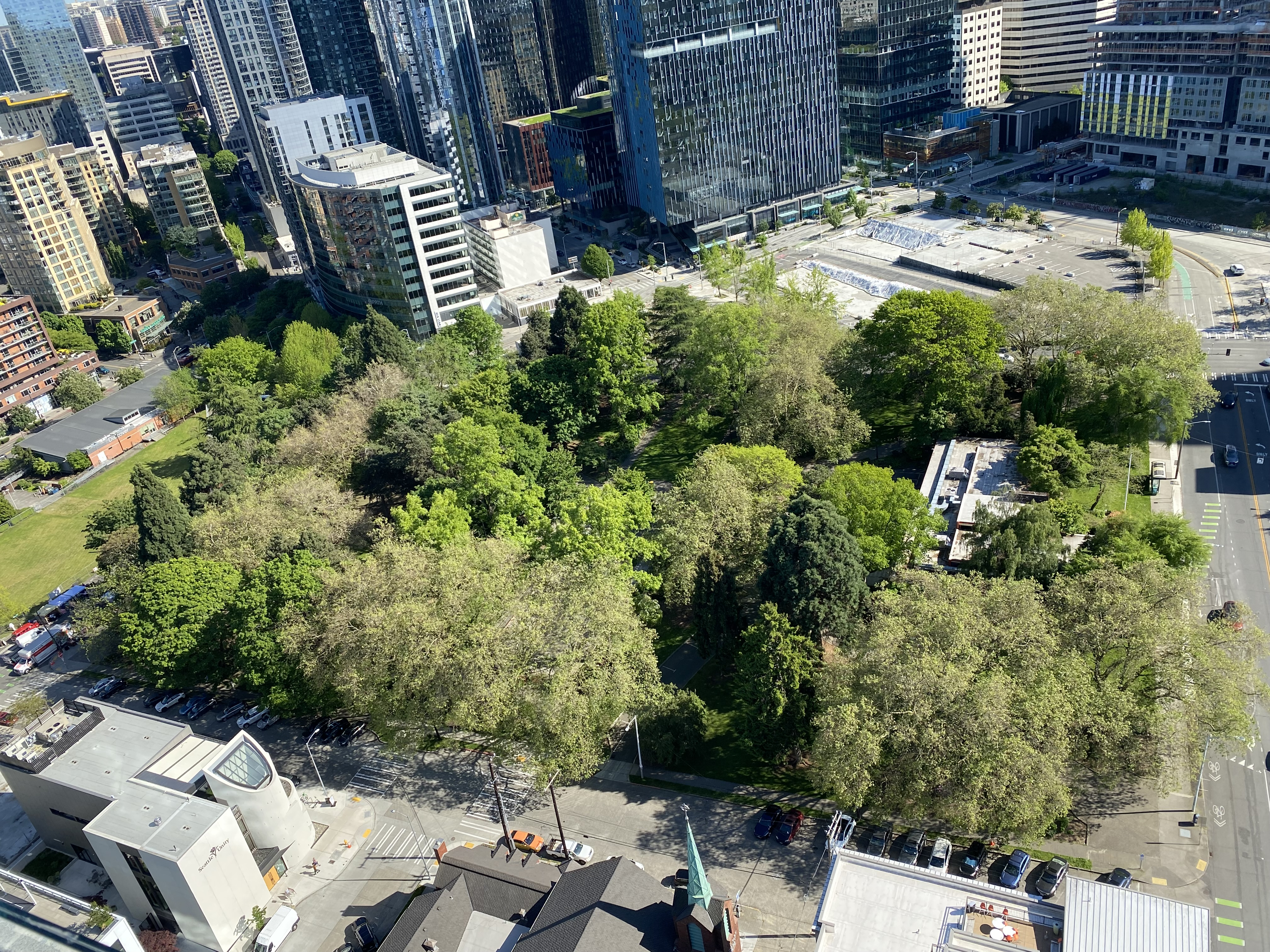
- Interactive map of Denny Park
- Type: Urban Park
- Location: Seattle, Washington
- Coordinates: 47°37′09″N 122°20′28″W
- Created: 1883; 143 years ago
- Operator: Seattle Parks and Recreation

Denny Park is a park located in the South Lake Union neighborhood of Seattle, Washington. It occupies the block bounded by John Street and Denny Way on the north and south and Dexter and 9th Avenues N. on the west and east.

== History ==
Denny Park is Seattle's oldest park. In 1861 pioneer David Denny donated the land to the city as Seattle Cemetery. In 1883, the graves were removed and the cemetery was converted to a park, the city's first. By 1904, the surrounding area had become residential, and the park was improved with formally designed planting beds, swings and other play equipment, a sand lot and a play field. The Denny School, an elementary school, stood slightly southeast of the park from 1884 to 1928. Children were, from the earliest, regular users of the park.

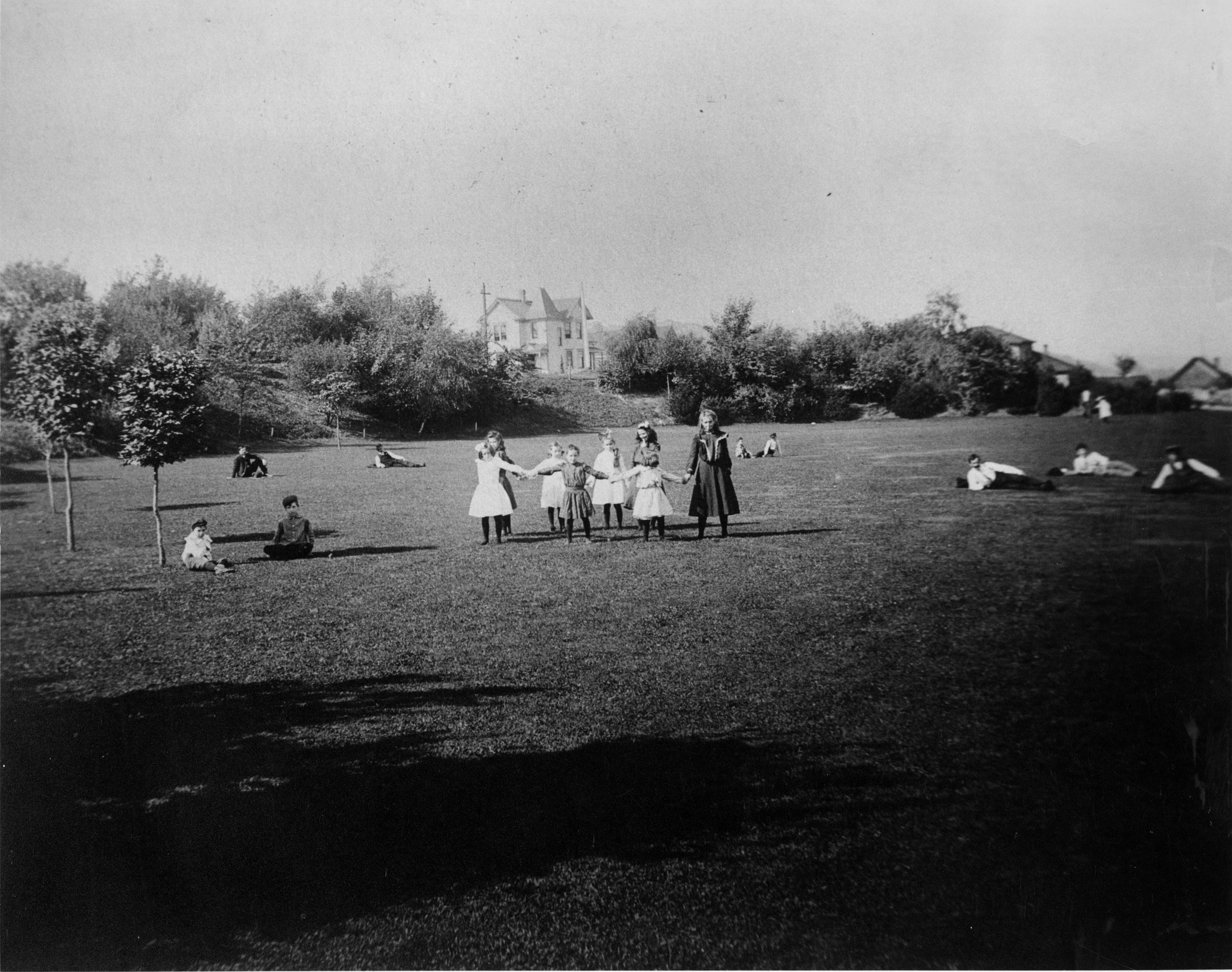
In 1904, before any regrading in this area.

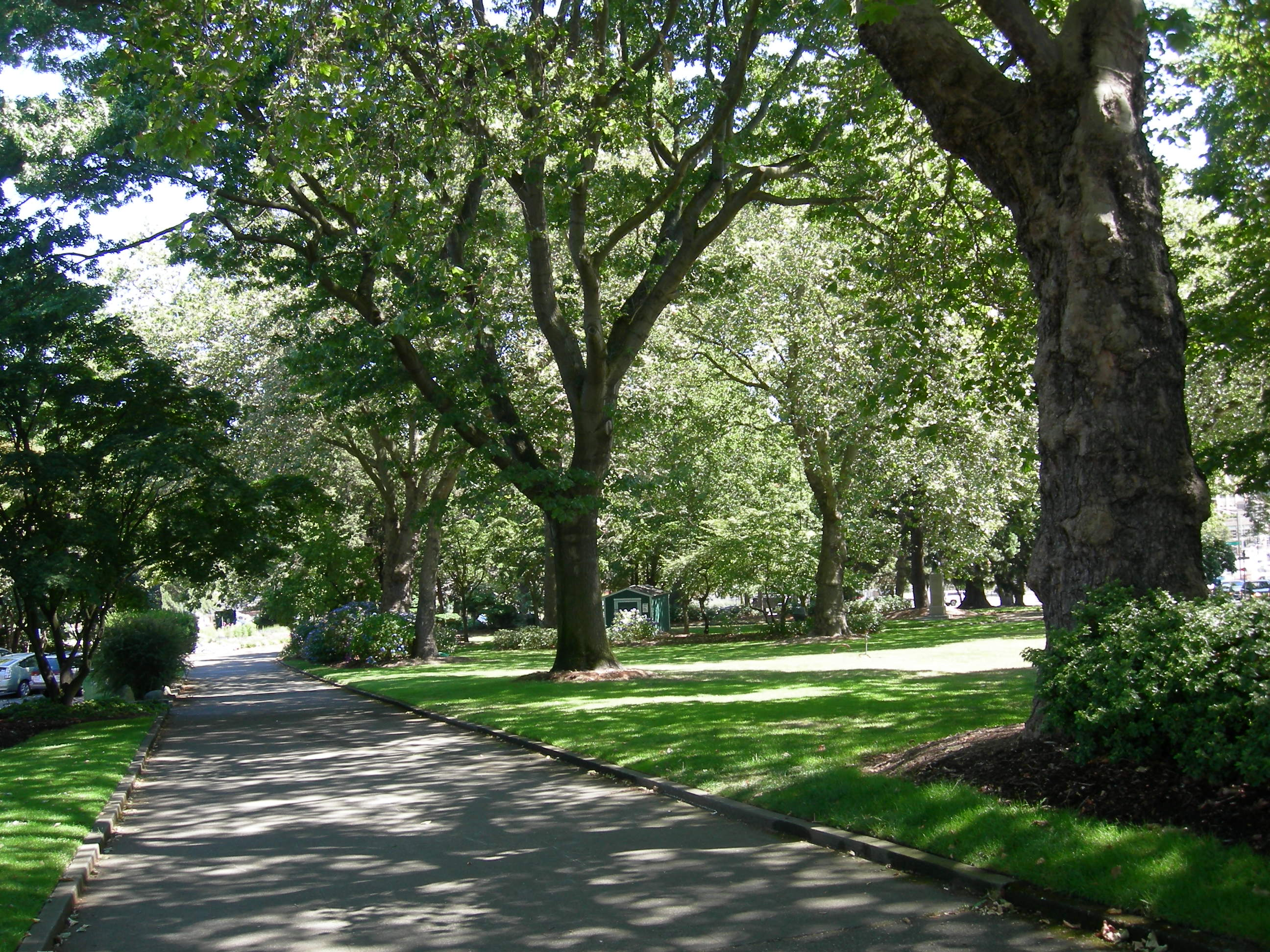
In August 2007.

The park originally stood on the north slope of Denny Hill. Between 1900 and 1931, the landscape of central Seattle was reshaped by a series of regrading projects. Denny Regrade No. 1, around 1910, lowered the land to the south and west of the park by some 60 feet (18 m). Some surviving Seattle pioneers successfully demanded that the park remain unchanged. The result, however, was that access to the park from the downtown side was impossible by car due to the grade. In Denny Regrade No. 2, around 1930, the park was graded flat and was once again planted in a formal style; the old Denny School was destroyed in the regrade, and its cupola was placed in the park as an historical marker.

A bust of Mark A. Matthews, a minister and activist, was installed in 1941. In 1948, over the objections of the Denny family, a Parks and Recreation building was built within the park to house this growing city department. For several years, before all of the space was required for Parks personnel, the lower level of the new building housed the Washington Society for Crippled Children. By 1964, Parks Department personnel had fully inhabited the building.

Phase 1 (Play area and lighting) opened on May 2, 2009. Future phases include a new central water feature and a history element highlighting early Seattle (to join the existing statue of Mark A. Matthews).

A coalition of park supporters called Friends of Denny Park advocates to city government for safety in the park. This group is working, in partnership with city departments, to revitalize the park to serve its users and the nearby neighborhoods South Lake Union and Denny Triangle.

In 2020, a large homeless encampment grew in Denny Park, leading some local residents to avoid the park due to concerns over personal safety. Following a park cleanup by volunteer group We Heart Seattle, the city swept the remaining residents and their belongings from the park.
