= Meeting with Myself at the four Cats of the World =

1948 painting by Victor Brauner

- Rencontre avec moi-même aux quatre chats du monde (French)
- Artist: Victor Brauner
- Year: 1948
- Medium: oil paint on canvas
- Movement: Surrealism
- Subject: allegorical self-portrait
- Dimensions: 195.5 cm × 130.5 cm (77.0 in × 51.4 in)
- Location: Musée d'Art moderne et contemporain, Strasbourg
- Accession: 1988

Meeting with Myself at the four Cats of the World (French: Rencontre avec moi-même aux quatre chats du monde) is an April 1948 oil painting by the Romanian artist exiled in France, Victor Brauner. It is owned by the Museum of Modern and Contemporary Art of Strasbourg, Alsace since 1988, thanks to a bequest by Jacqueline Brauner, the artist's widow. The painting's inventory number is 55.988.1.9.

1948, the year when Brauner painted this large self-portrait of sorts, was also the year of his exclusion from the Surrealist movement. It depicts two regal and archaic figures named "Victor" meeting and greeting each other, observed by four cats and surrounded by birds and a host of surrealist symbols, including two snakes, and the sun and the moon. The title is written on the canvas.
