= Gerda Sprinchorn =

Swedish sculptor (1871–1951)

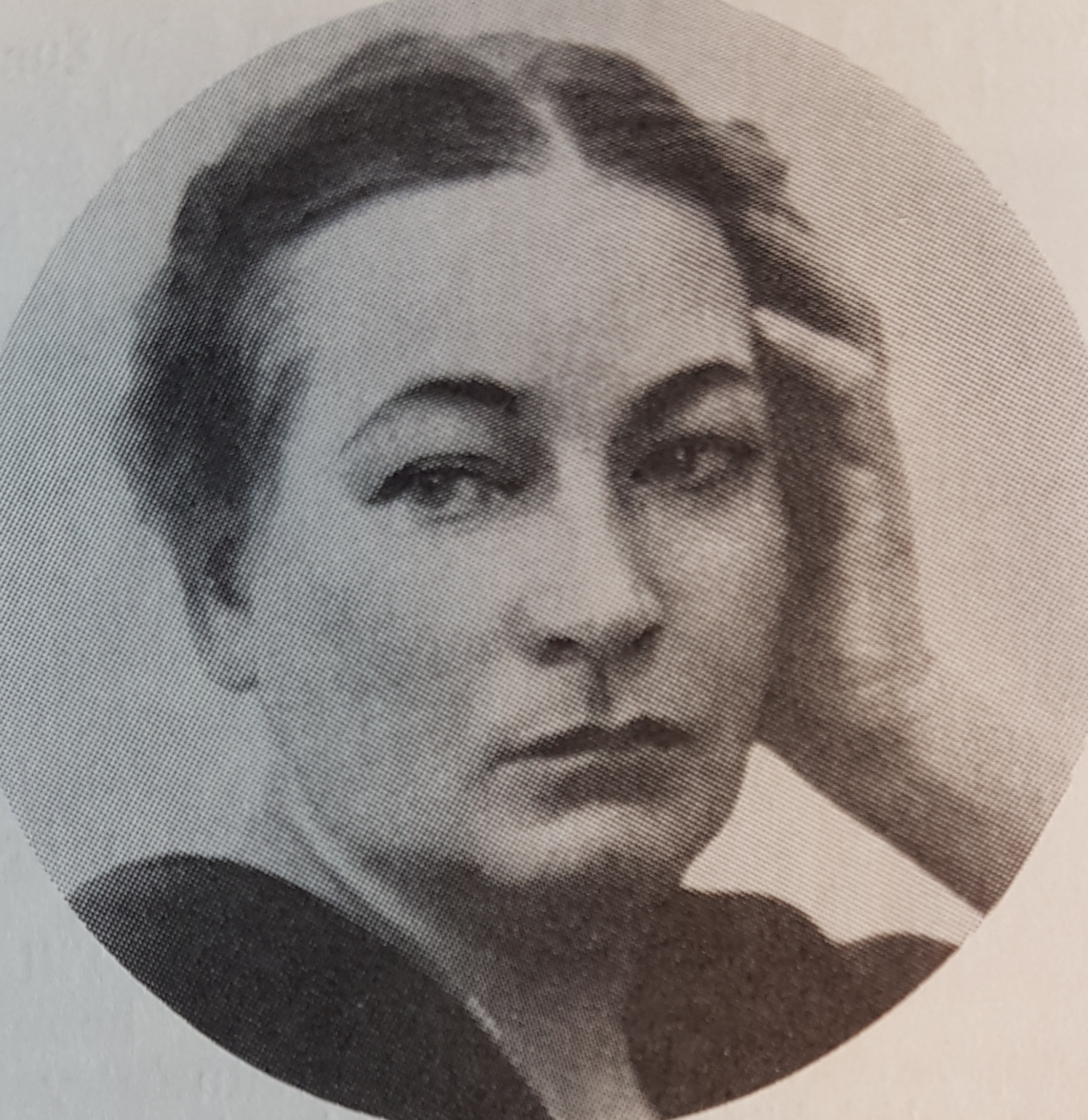
- Gerda Sprinchorn
- Born: Gertrud Linnéa Sprinchorn; 29 April 1871; Lisselberga, Sweden
- Died: 21 March 1951 (aged 79); Stockholm, Sweden
- Education: Royal Swedish Academy of Fine Arts
- Occupations: Sculptor; ceramist

Gertrud Linnéa Sprinchorn (29 April 1871 – 21 March 1951) was a Swedish sculptor and ceramist. She is best known for her sculptures Cleopatra and Helig dans, the former of which won her the Royal Medal from the Royal Swedish Academy of Fine Arts.

== Life ==
Gerda Sprinchorn was born on 29 April 1871 in Lisselberga, Västmanland County, Sweden. She was one of the four children to Carl Ludvig Sprinchorn, an accountant, and his wife Hildegard Juliana Littmark. Initially a student at the Technical School in Uppsala, she studied at the Higher Art Industrial School in Stockholm from 1890 to 1893. Sprinchorn was subsequently a student of the Royal Swedish Academy of Fine Arts in Stockholm, where she was taught by sculptor John Börjeson. In 1899, she won the Hertigliga Medal from the Academy for her sculpture Peri vid paradisets port. In 1900, Cleopatra won her the Academy's Royal Medal. The most distinctive feature of the sculpture was its realistic design which depicted Cleopatra's death with a serpent waiting to strike her. It was first exhibited at the Föreningen Svenska Konstnärinnor, where it was met with acclaim. Cleopatra has often been regarded as Sprinchorn's best-known work.

After completing her training, Sprinchorn traveled to Paris for a year. During her trips to Dalarna between 1904 and 1907, she created several ethnographic statuettes including, Israelsfaster and Gubbe och gumma. The former depicts a seated figure of a female who is dressed for mourning and reading her hymnbook, while the latter shows an elderly couple wearing a traditional outfit. In 1906, Sprinchorn traveled to Italy. During her visit to Capri, she crafted the figures Flickan med korg på huvudet and Nanina. While in Finland, she designed the sculptures Finngubbe and Storebror. Critics have identified the traditional folk theme to predominate her early figurines, as well as decorative pieces such as lamps, inkstands, and receptacles.

Helig dans is one of Sprinchorn's notable works. The half-metre tall sculpture portrays a lady walking ahead with her arms outstretched dressed in sheer windswept clothing. Cast in 1913, it was originally intended to be paired with a complementary figurine entitled Profan dans but it was never completed. Sprinchorn instead produced a small terracotta carving called Danse macabre. According to the artist, Helig dans was "something clean and strong and calm". In her later years, she experimented with handmade art, and implemented Japanese ceramics on her works Flöjtblåsare and Japanska. Both were acquired by the National Museum of Fine Arts. Works by Sprinchorn have appeared in many significant exhibitions including the Norrköping Exhibition and the Lund Exhibition, and those organised by the Swedish Artists Association and the Gothenburg Art Association. She also participated in several international exhibitions held in Munich, Helsinki, London, Vienna, Copenhagen, San Francisco and Philadelphia. Her only public artwork is a sculpture of Swedish botanist Carl Linnaeus, entitled Linnéstaty that she saw unveiled in 1948. Although the model was completed in 1907, it was raised as a public monument after 40 years. Sprinchorn died three years later in Stockholm, on 21 March 1951.
