= Don Perlis =

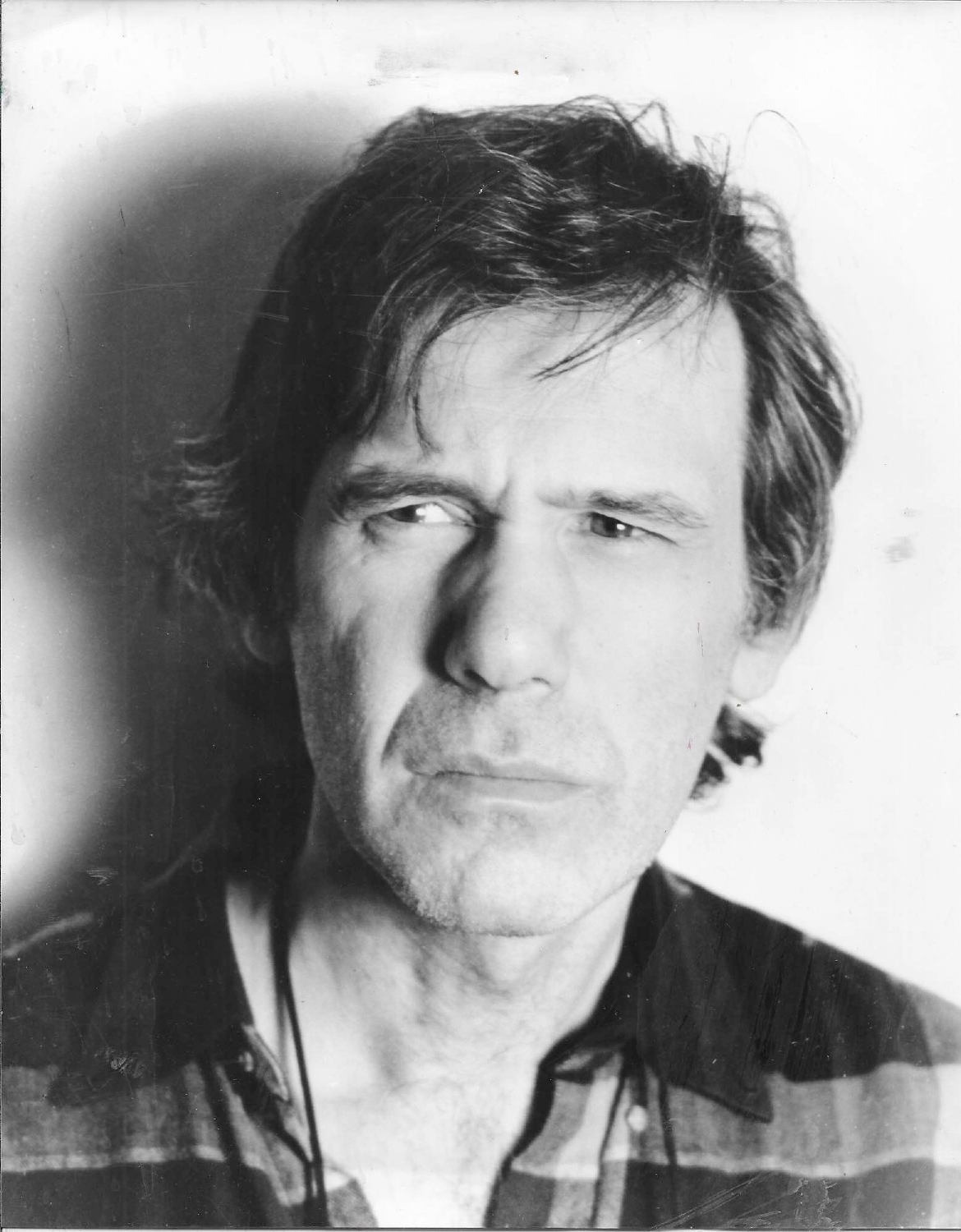
- Born: 1941 (age 84–85); Bronx, New York
- Citizenship: American
- Occupation: Painter
- Known for: 'Floyd (2020)' painting
- Website: https://www.donperlis.com/

Don Perlis (born 1941) is an American painter based in New York city, known for his socially engaged artworks.

== Early life and education ==
Don Perlis was born in The Bronx, New York, to a working class Jewish family. His Russian immigrant father worked as a greengrocer and was an obsessive photographer. He died when Perlis was 15.

Perlis started drawing when he was a child and planned to become an artist. He enrolled in the School of Visual Arts in Arts education after taking night classes in the Arts education after taking night classes in the Art Students League. Next year, he transferred to Fine Arts program and later joined the Skowhegan School of Painting and Sculpture after two years at SVA.

Perlis worked as an assistant under painter and filmmaker Alfred Leslie. He was known for his contributions to Abstract Expressionism and realist art.

== Career ==
Perlis was the youngest member of a group of artists in the 60s who revived the figurative and representational art. The movement contrasted with the trends of abstraction and minimalism. This group included artists such as such as Philip Pearlstein, Alfred Leslie, Jack Beal, Alice Neel, Paul Georges, and Lennart Anderson.

Pearls' career spans over sixty years. He officially debuted with the 1970 landmark exhibition 22 Realists at the Whitney Museum of American Art, which also lincluded works from William Bailey, Richard Estes, Chuck Close, Audrey Flack, Malcom Morley, and Philip Pearlstein. Curated by James Monte and organized by Marcia Tucker, the exhibition became a turning point for realist art in the market. After his show gained success, Perlis became the youngest artist to exhibit at the Graham Gallery.

In 1972, Perlis was invited to teach at Skowhegan alongside Georges.

When he purchased a home in Bridgehampton, New York, he was introduced to artists Williem de Kooning, Fairfield Porter and Jane Freilicher.

Perlis's work has been the subject solo exhibitions in New York City and he been included in numerous group exhibitions across the United States and internationally. His work has been shown at major institutions including the American Academy of Arts and Letters, the Queens Museum, the National Museum, Gdańsk, the Whitney Museum of American Art, and the Cleveland Museum of Art.

In 2018, Perlis had a solo exhibition at the National Academy of Design, which featured his monumental painting Trumpworld. In 2020, a subsequent exhibition of works from the Trumpworld series was held at Solomon Fine Arts in Manhattan, In 2025, Ilon gallery in Harlem staged the solo exhibition Don Perlis' New York.

Perlis's 2020 painting Floyd was reproduced in a large-scale printed format and received attention after being featured on billboards in New York City's Times Square, West Hollywood, LA, Atlanta, GA and Washington, D.C and Minneapolis, Minnesota during the George Floyd Protests. A mural of the work was to be displayed in Minneapolis, where the homicide George Floyd occurred, but was ultimately rejected by billboard owner Clear Channel but then mounted by Blue Ox Media, in Minneapolis, Minnesota.

== Artistic style and themes ==
Perlis is known for his oil paintings, which incorporate classical techniques. He avoids using photographic references and relies on a "continual space" that displays perception. His subjects include landscapes and portraits to elaborate multi-figure compositions that reflect opera, mythology, classical literature, politics and culture.

Whitehot Magazine critic Donald Kuspit said: “Perlis is the Pieter Bruegel of our times. Bruegel’s works were sharpe or sarcastic and provocative; socially critical and ruthlessly realistic.”

== Teaching and legacy ==
Additionally, Perlis taught art for over forty years as a professor at the Fashion Institute of Technology in New York and at Pratt Institute.
