= Victor Brauner =

Romanian artist (1903–1966)

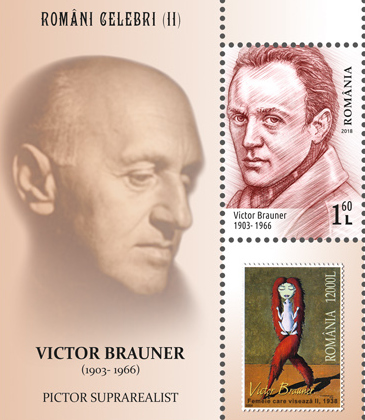
- Brauner and his work on a 2018 stamp sheet
- Born: 15 June 1903; Piatra Neamț, Romania
- Died: 12 March 1966 (aged 62); Paris, France
- Resting place: Montmartre Cemetery, Paris
- Education: Bucharest National University of Arts
- Movement: Surrealism
- Relatives: Harry Brauner (brother)

Victor Brauner (Romanian: [ˈviktor ˈbrawner], also spelled Viktor Brauner; 15 June 1903 – 12 March 1966) was a Romanian painter and sculptor of the surrealist movement. He became a naturalized French citizen in 1963.

== Early life ==
He was born in Piatra Neamț, Romania, the son of a Jewish timber manufacturer who subsequently settled in Vienna with his family for a few years. It is there that young Victor attended elementary school. When his family returned to Romania in 1914, he continued his studies at the Lutheran school in Brăila. His interests revolved around zoology during that period.

He attended the National School of Fine Arts in Bucharest (1916–1918) and Horia Igiroșanu private school of painting. He visited Fălticeni and Balcic, and started painting landscapes in the manner of Paul Cézanne. Then, as he testified himself, he went through all the stages: "Dadaist, Abstractionist, Expressionist".

On 26 September 1924, the Mozart Galleries in Bucharest hosted his first personal exhibition. In that period he met poet Ilarie Voronca, together with whom he founded the 75HP magazine. It was in this magazine that Brauner published the manifesto The Pictopoetry and the article The Surrationalism. He painted and exhibited Christ at the Cabaret (in the manner of George Grosz) and The Girl in the Factory (in the manner of Ferdinand Hodler). He participated to the Contimporanul exhibition in November 1924.

In 1925, he undertook his first journey to Paris, from where he returned in 1927. In the period 1928–1931 he was a contributor of the unu magazine (an avant-garde periodical with Dadaist and Surrealist tendencies), which published reproductions of most of his paintings and graphic works: "clear drawings and portraits made by Victor Brauner to his friends, poets and writers" (Jaques Lessaigne – Painters I Knew).

In 1930, he settled in Paris, where he met Constantin Brâncuși, who instructed him in methods of art photography. In that same period he became a friend of the Romanian poet Benjamin Fondane and met Yves Tanguy, who would later introduce him to the circle of the Surrealists. He lived on Moulin Vert Street, in the same building as Alberto Giacometti and Tanguy. He painted Self-portrait with enucleated eye, a premonitory theme.

In 1934 André Breton wrote an introduction to the catalogue for Brauner's first Parisian solo exhibition at the Pierre Gallery. The theme of the eye was omnipresent: Mr. K's power of concentration and The strange case of Mr. K are paintings that Breton compared with Alfred Jarry’s play Ubu Roi, "a huge, caricature-like satire of the bourgeoisie".

In 1935, Brauner returned to Bucharest. He joined the ranks of the Romanian Communist Party for a short while, without a very firm conviction, but campaigned for the party with the surrealists Mary Stanley Low and Juan Ramón Breá when they visited him. On 7 April 1935, he opened a new personal exhibition at the Mozart Galleries. Sașa Pană wrote about it in his autobiographical novel, Born in 02:

The catalogue shows 16 paintings; they are accompanied by verse, surrealist images that are exquisite by their bizarreness – they are perhaps the creations of automatic dictation and they certainly bear no connection to the painting itself. They are written in French, but their colorful taste is kept in their Romanian language translation. The exhibition brought about many interesting articles and takings of position regarding Surrealism in arts and literature.

Another remark about Brauner's participation to Surrealist exhibitions: "Despite its appearance of abstract formula … this trend is a point of transition to the art that is to come" (Dolfi Trost, in Rampa of 14 April 1935). In Cuvântul liber of 20 April 1935, Miron Radu Paraschivescu wrote in the article Victor Brauner’s exhibition: "In contrast to what one may see, for instance, in the neighboring exhibition halls, Victor Brauner’s painting means integration, an attitude that is a social one, as far as art allows it. For V. Brauner takes attitude through the very character and ideology of his art". On 27 April, he created the illustrations for Gellu Naum’s poetry collections – The Incendiary Traveler and The Freedom to Sleep on the Forehead.

== Exile ==
In 1938, he returned to France. On 28 August, he lost his left eye in a violent argument between Oscar Domínguez and Esteban Francés. Brauner attempted to protect Esteban and was hit by a glass thrown by Domínguez: the premonition became true.

That same year, he met Jaqueline Abraham, who was to become his wife. He created a series of paintings called lycanthropic or sometimes chimeras.

He left Paris during Nazi Germany's invasion of France in 1940, together with Pierre Mabille. He lived for a while in Perpignan, at Robert Rius', then at Canet-plage, in the Eastern Pyrenees and at Saint-Féliu-d'Amont, where he was forcibly secluded. However, he kept in touch with the Surrealists who had taken refuge in Marseille. In 1941, he was granted the permission to settle in Marseille. Seriously ill, he was hospitalized at the "Paradis" clinic.

He painted Prelude to a civilization in 1954, now in New York's Metropolitan Museum of Art. The painting is in encaustic on Masonite. After the war, he took part in the Venice Biennale, and traveled to Italy.

In 1959, he settled in a studio at 72, rue Lepic, in Montmartre. In 1961, he traveled to Italy again. In the same year, New York City's Bodley Gallery mounted a solo exhibition of Brauner's work. He settled in Varengeville in Normandy, where he spent most of his time working.

In 1965, he created an ensemble of object-paintings, grouped under the titles Mythologie and Fêtes des mères. These paintings were made in Varengeville and in Athanor in 1964, where Brauner retreated. His last painting, La fin et le début (made in 1965), reminds us that "when the painter's life ends, his work starts living".

In 1966, he was chosen to represent France at the Venice Biennale, where an entire hall was dedicated to him.

== Death and family ==
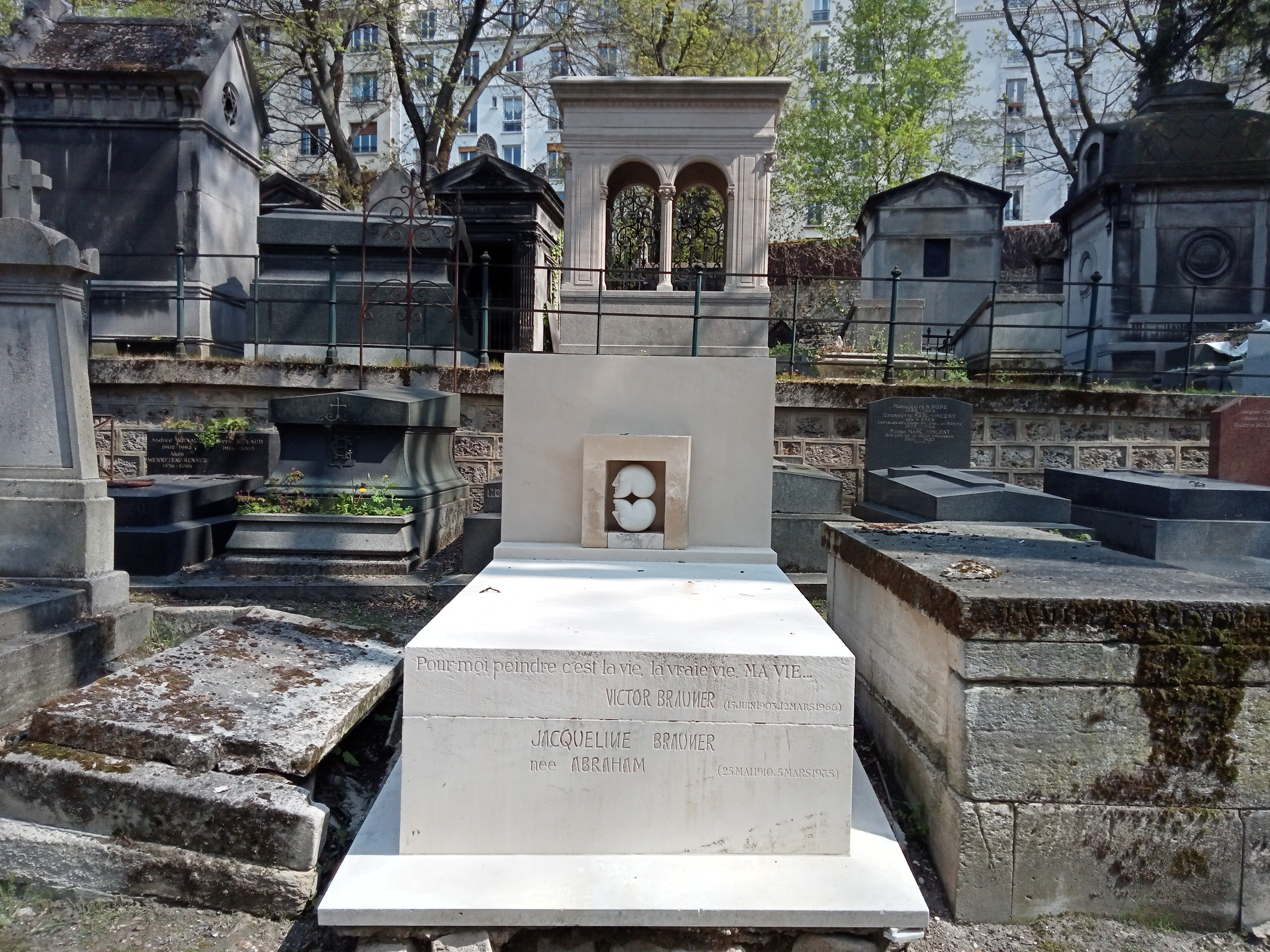
Brauner's grave at Montmartre Cemetery

He died in Paris as a result of a prolonged illness. The epitaph on his tomb from Montmartre Cemetery is a phrase from his notebooks: "Peindre, c'est la vie, la vraie vie, ma vie" ("Painting is life, real life, my life").

The painter's notebooks with private notes, which he handed to Max Pol Fouchet, partly enclose the "key" of his creation: "Each painting that I make is projected from the deepest sources of my anxiety..."

Victor Brauner's brother, Harry Brauner, was a folklorist who later married Lena Constante.

== Art market ==
The most expensive of his paintings in the art market was Tableau Autobiographique - Ultratableau Biosensible (1948), who sold by $993,000 at Sotheby's New York, on 7 May 2008.

== Collections ==
Brauner was a very prolific artist, especially considering his relatively short life span. About 3,000 works can be found in French collections alone, among which especially:

- 2,235 works in the collection of the Musée d'art moderne de Saint-Étienne
- 145 works in the collection of the Musée National d'Art Moderne
- 79 works in the collection of the Musée d'Art Moderne de Paris
- 38 works in the collection of the Musée d'art moderne et contemporain de Strasbourg
- 28 works in the collection of the Musée Cantini

As well as works in the Musée de l'Abbaye Sainte-Croix of Les Sables-d'Olonne (at least 19 works), the Museum of Grenoble (6 oil on canvas paintings), the Unterlinden Museum, etc.

In the United States, the Menil Collection owns 19 works by Brauner. Major museums such as the Museum of Modern Art, the Metropolitan Museum of Art, the Solomon R. Guggenheim Museum, the Art Institute of Chicago, the Los Angeles County Museum of Art, and the San Francisco Museum of Modern Art also own works by Brauner. (see Project sum of all paintings/Creator/Victor Brauner)

== See also ==
- Hommage à Marcel Duchamp, June 1947 painting by Brauner. A celebration of sorts of his friend's creative genius.
- Meeting with Myself at the four Cats of the World, April 1948 painting by Brauner. A large self-portrait of sorts, depicting "Victor" meeting and greeting "Victor".
- Transatlantic (portrayal in 2023 TV series)

== Bibliography ==
- Victor Brauner, je suis le rêve je suis l'inspiration, exhibition catalogue Jeanne Brun (ed.), Sophie Krebs(ed.), Camille Morando(ed.), texts by Camille Morando, Sophie Krebs, Fabrice Flahutez, ali, Paris, Paris Musées, musée d’Art moderne de Paris, 2021.
- Camille Morando, « Matérialité magique des objets à la finalité talismanique chez deux artistes autour du surréalisme en regard de l’art brut », in Dimensions de l’art brut. Une histoire des matérialités, Fabrice Flahutez (dir), Jill Carrick (dir), Pauline Goutain (dir.), Nanterre, France, Presses universitaires de Paris Nanterre, 2017, p. 47–51.
- Emil Nicolae: Victor Brauner. La izvoarele operei. Prefaţă de Amelia Pavel. Editura Hasefer: Bucharest, 2004.
- Claus Stephani: Das Bild des Juden in der modernen Malerei. Eine Einführung. / Imaginea evreului în pictura modernă. Studiu introductiv. Traducere în limba română de Ion Peleanu. (Zweisprachige Ausgabe, deutsch-rumänisch. Ediţie bilingvă, româno-germană.) Editura Hasefer: Bucharest, 2005. ISBN 973-630-091-9
- Claus Stephani: Einer von ihnen war Victor Brauner. Die großen Namen der europäischen Avantgarde. In: David. Jüdische Kulturzeitschrift (Viena), 18. Jg., Nr. 68, April 2006, S. 46–48 (online)
