= Russell Drysdale =

Australian artist

Sir Russell Drysdale AC
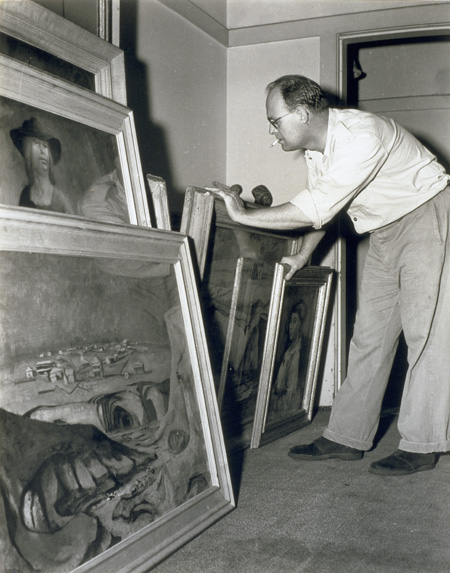
- Russell Drysdale with some canvases, taken by Australian photographer Max Dupain, 1945
- Born: 7 February 1912; Bognor Regis, England
- Died: 29 June 1981 (aged 69); Sydney, Australia
- Known for: Painter
- Notable work: Moody's pub (1941); The Drover's Wife (1945); Sofala (1947); The cricketers (1948); West Wyalong (1949)
- Awards: Wynne Prize 1947 (Sofala)

Sir George Russell Drysdale AC (7 February 1912 – 29 June 1981), also known as Tass Drysdale, was an Australian artist. He won the prestigious Wynne Prize for Sofala in 1947, and represented Australia at the Venice Biennale in 1954. He was influenced by abstract and surrealist art, and "created a new vision of the Australian scene as revolutionary and influential as that of Tom Roberts".

== Early life and career ==
George Russell Drysdale was born in Bognor Regis, Sussex, England, to an Anglo-Australian pastoralist family, which settled in Melbourne, Australia in 1923. Drysdale was educated at Geelong Grammar School. He had poor eyesight all his life, and was virtually blind in his left eye from age 17 due to a detached retina (which later caused his application for military service to be rejected).

Drysdale worked on his uncle's estate in Queensland, and as a jackaroo in Victoria, however such activiies were sidelined in 1932 by an operation on his eye undertaken by Melbourne surgeon and photographer Julian Smith. He showed Drysdale’s drawings to artist and critic Daryl Lindsay who suggested the possibility of a career as an artist and introduced him to modernist artist, teacher and founder of the Contemporary Art Society, George Bell. Supported by a fellow artist, Drysdale studied with Bell in Melbourne from 1935 to 1938.

Drysdale also trained in Europe; during 1938–39, attending the Grosvenor School in London and the Grande Chaumière in Paris. By the time of his return from the third of these trips in June 1939 Drysdale was recognised within Australia as an important emerging talent, but had yet to find a personal vision. His decision to leave Melbourne for Albury and then Sydney in 1940 was instrumental in his discovery of his lifelong subject matter, the Australian outback and its inhabitants. Equally important was the influence of fellow artist Peter Purves Smith in guiding him towards his characteristic mature style with its use of desolate landscapes inhabited by sparse figures under ominous skies.

== Sydney ==
Drysdale's 1942 solo exhibition in Sydney (his second in point of time; his first had been in Melbourne in 1938) was a critical success, and established him as one of the leading Sydney modernists of the time, together with William Dobell, Elaine Haxton, and Donald Friend. In 1944, The Sydney Morning Herald sent him into far western New South Wales "to illustrate the effects of the then-devastating drought". With his series of paintings of drought-ravaged western New South Wales and, later, a series based on the derelict gold-mining town of Hill End, his reputation continued to grow during the 1940s. Sofala, a painting of the nearby town of Sofala, won the Wynne Prize for landscape in 1947. His 1948 work, The cricketers has been described by the National Gallery of Australia as "one of the most original and haunting images in all Australian art."

== London 1950 ==
His 1950 exhibition at London's Leicester Galleries, at the invitation of Sir Kenneth Clark, was a significant milestone in the history of Australian art. Until this time, Australian art had been regarded as a provincial sub-species of British art; Drysdale's works convinced British critics that Australian artists had a distinctive vision of their own, exploring a physical and psychological landscape at once mysterious, poetic, and starkly beautiful. The exhibition initiated the international recognition of Australian art that quickly came to include Dobell, Sidney Nolan, Arthur Boyd, Clifton Pugh, and others who came to national and international prominence in the 1950s.

== Last years ==
Drysdale's reputation continued to grow throughout the 1950s and 1960s as he explored remote Australia and its inhabitants. In 1954, together with Nolan and Dobell, he was chosen to represent Australia at the Venice Biennale, and in 1960, at Bouddi near Gosford, New South Wales. Also in 1960, he was the first Australian artist to be given a retrospective by the Art Gallery of New South Wales.

In 1962 he co-wrote a travel book, Journey Among Men, with Jock Marshall. They dedicated it to their wives, "who were good enough to stay at home".

In 1963 the Reserve Bank of Australia, then led by H. C. Coombs, appointed him to a small committee supervising the note designs for the new Australian decimal currency (which finally came into fruition in 1966).

In 1969, Drysdale was knighted for his services to art, and in 1980, he was appointed a Companion of the Order of Australia. His later years saw a marked falling off in the quantity of his output, which had never been large.

Drysdale died in Sydney on 29 June 1981 of cancer. At his request, Sir Russell's cremated remains were placed in the shade of a tree by the church in the burial ground beside historic St Paul's Anglican Church, Kincumber.

== Personal life ==
He was married twice, and had a son, Tim, and a daughter, Lynne. As an 11 year-old, Tim co-starred in the film Wherever She Goes, on the life of Eileen Joyce, the Tasmanian born pianist, playing the part of Eileen's brother. Tim took his own life in 1962, aged twenty one, and the following year, Drysdale's wife Bon also committed suicide. In 1964 Drysdale married Maisie Purves Smith, an old friend.

Soon after Tim's suicide, Drysdale made the acquaintance of the composer Peter Sculthorpe, who had recently lost his father. The two spent a working holiday together in a house on the Tamar River in Tasmania, and became lifelong friends. Sculthorpe came to regard Drysdale as a role model, admiring the way he reworked familiar material in new ways. He said: "In later years he was often accused of painting the same picture over and over again. But his answer was that he was no different to a Renaissance artist, striving again and again to paint the perfect Madonna-and-Child. Since then, I've never had a problem about the idea of reusing and reworking my material. Like Tass, I've come to look on my whole output as one slowly emerging work". He dedicated works to Russell Drysdale and to the memory of Bonnie Drysdale.

Drysdale's second wife Maisie was the sister-in-law of the Canadian novelist Robertson Davies, with whom Peter Sculthorpe discussed collaborating on an opera based on the Australian adventures of the Irish actor Gustavus Vaughan Brooke.

== Style and themes ==
Australian art scholar and gallery director Ron Radford argues that, towards the end of World War II, Drysdale triggered "'a general reddening' of Australian landscape art". Radford describes Drysdale's work as follows: "His dried up earth suggested that man had lost control of the land - nature had fought back and taken back". Drysdale's Australia was "hot, red, isolated, desolate and subtly threatening". His The Drover's Wife "cohabits in Australians' minds with Sidney Nolan's Carcass paintings" as conveying a sense of desolation. Drysdale's red presents "a landscape deeply, intrinsically inhospitable" and conveys the "utter alienation" of the figures he paints in the landscape.

Drysdale's use of colour photography as an aide-mémoire was the subject of an exhibition in 1987 at the NGV and publication which reveals in previously unknown photographic imagery this method of working and his stylisation in interpretation of subject matter and specific locations.

Christine Wallace suggests that Drysdale "was the visual poet of that passive, all-encompassing despair that endless heat and drought induces", but that it was Sidney Nolan who, with a similar view, "most powerfully projected this take on Australia to the outside world".

Lou Klepac, summing up in his 1983 work on Drysdale, says: "He found in the common elements of the landscape permanent and moving images which have become part of the visual lingua franca of modern Australia...Those who see in Drysdale's paintings a world remote from the comforts and pleasures they depend on, feel that he depicts loneliness and isolation. To him it was the opposite, a liberation from the anguish of the civilised world."

In June 2017 one of Drysdale's last works, Grandma's Sunday Walk (1972), sold for $2.97 million, "the fifth-highest price for any Australian artwork at auction".

== See also ==
- Australian art
