= Automatic door =

Door equipped with sensors to automatically open

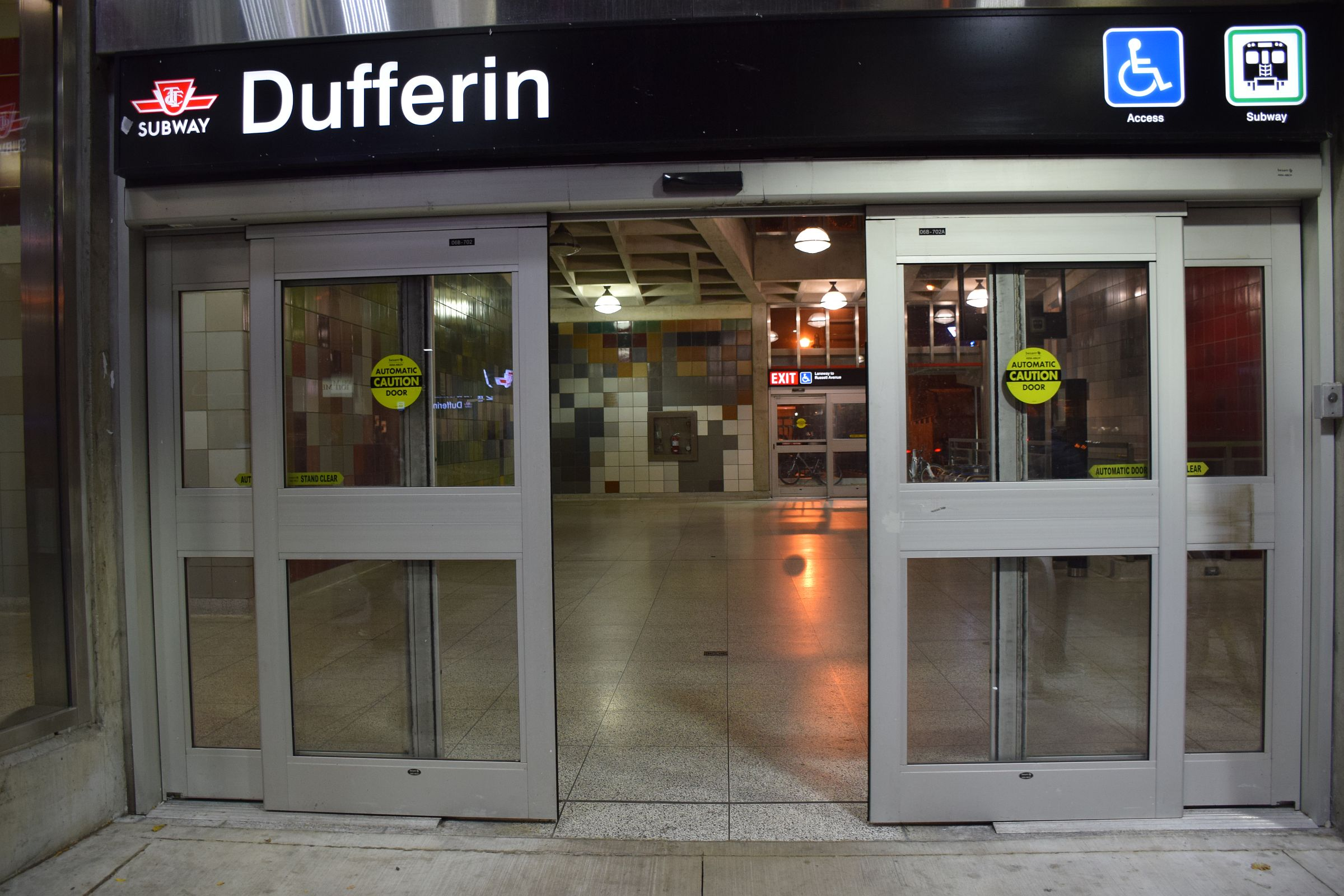
A pair of automatic doors

An automatic door, less commonly known as an auto door, is a door that opens automatically, without the need for human intervention or usually upon sensing the approach of a person. A person can be detected by microwave pulses, infrared sensors, or pressure-sensing pads.

== History ==
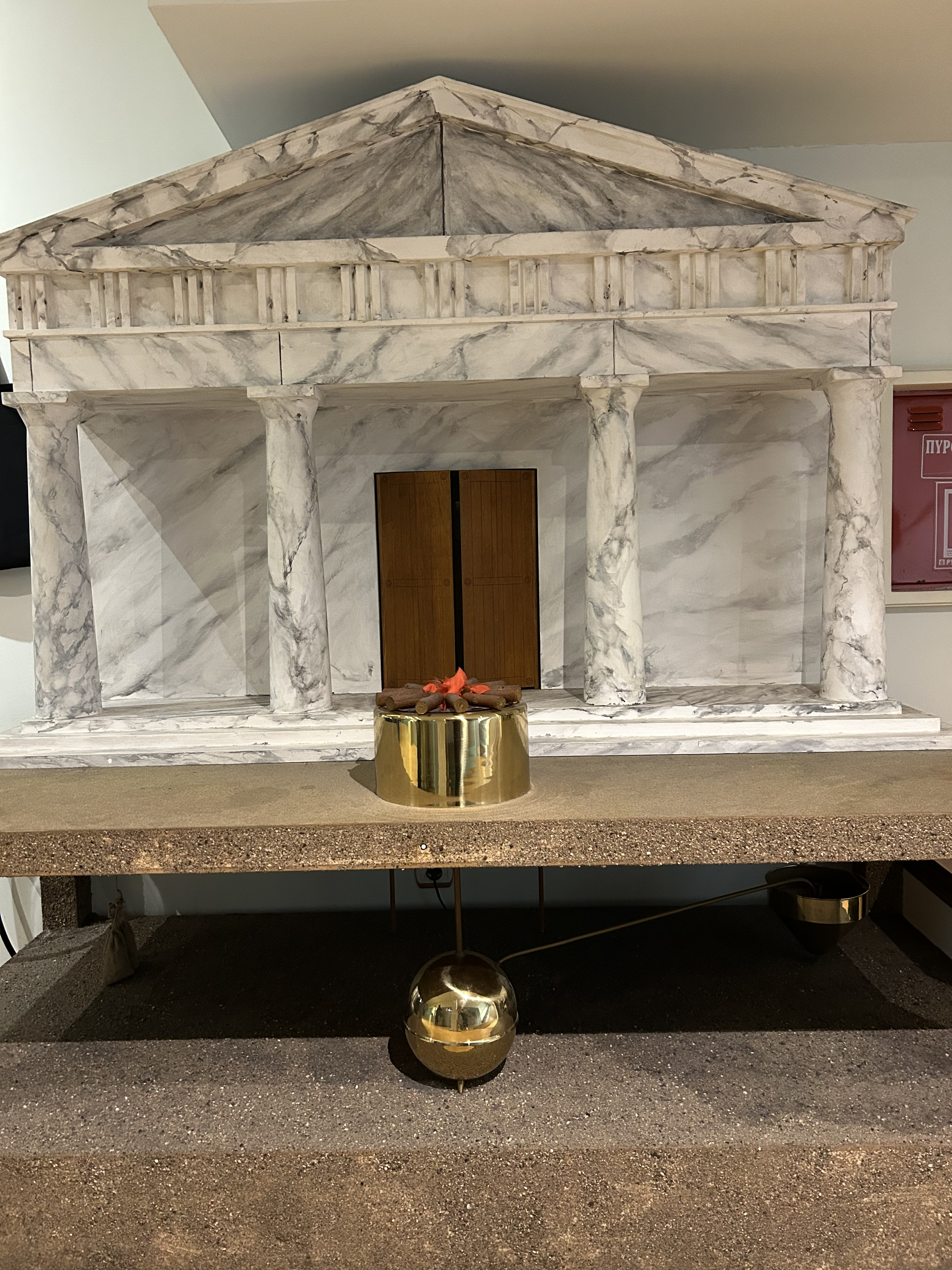
A replica of Heron's automated temple doors by Kotsanas Museum of Ancient Greek Technology, Athens, Greece.

In the 1st century AD, mathematician Heron of Alexandria in Roman Egypt invented the first known automatic door. He described two different automatic door applications. The first application used heat from a fire lit by the city's temple priest. After a few hours atmospheric pressure built up in a brass vessel causing it to pump water into adjacent containers. These containers acted as weights that – through a series of ropes and pulleys – would open the temple's doors at about the time people were to arrive for prayer. Heron used a similar application to open the gates to the city.

In 1931, engineers Horace H. Raymond and Sheldon S. Roby of the tool and hardware manufacturer Stanley Works designed the first model of an optical device triggering the opening of an automatic door. The invention was patented and installed in Wilcox's Pier Restaurant in West Haven, Connecticut for the benefit of waiters carrying plates of food and drink. The entire system plus installation was sold for $100.

In 1954, Dee Horton and Lew Hewitt invented the first sliding automatic door. The automatic door used a mat actuator. In 1960, they co-founded Horton Automatics Inc and placed the first commercial automatic sliding door on the market.

With the invention of the Gunn diode, microwave motion detectors became common in automatic doors in the 1970s. In 1980, the first automatic door using an infrared sensor was introduced.

== In popular culture ==
- In H. G. Wells’ 1899 serialised story When the Sleeper Wakes appears an automatic door that slides upwards into the ceiling.
- In the cartoon The Jetsons, which first aired in 1962 and was set in the year 2062, doors opened automatically by sliding up into the ceiling.
- In the intro sequence to the television show Get Smart, which first aired in 1965, the main character walks down a hallway through various automatically opening doors, including hinged doors, pocket doors, and vertically sliding doors.
- Automatic pocket doors are a common fixture of the fictional universe of Star Trek, which first aired in 1966.
- The 1968 film, 2001: A Space Odyssey, features pocket doors, some of which are opened by pressing a button, and some of which are opened by giving verbal commands to artificial intelligence computer systems. The concept of A.I.-controlled doors became a cultural touchstone through the film's memorable quote, "Open the pod bay doors, HAL."
- In the fictional universe of Star Wars, the first film of which was first released in 1977, a variety of automatic doors are featured, including horizontally sliding pocket doors, vertically sliding doors, diagonally-oriented multi-layer blast doors, aperture doors, and iris doors.
- The comedy cartoon Futurama, which first aired in 1999, parodied many different types of automatic doors reminiscent of those seen in The Jetsons, Star Trek, and Star Wars.

== See also ==
- Electronic lock
- High-speed door
- Platform screen doors
- Automatic gate
