= Rytec Corporation =

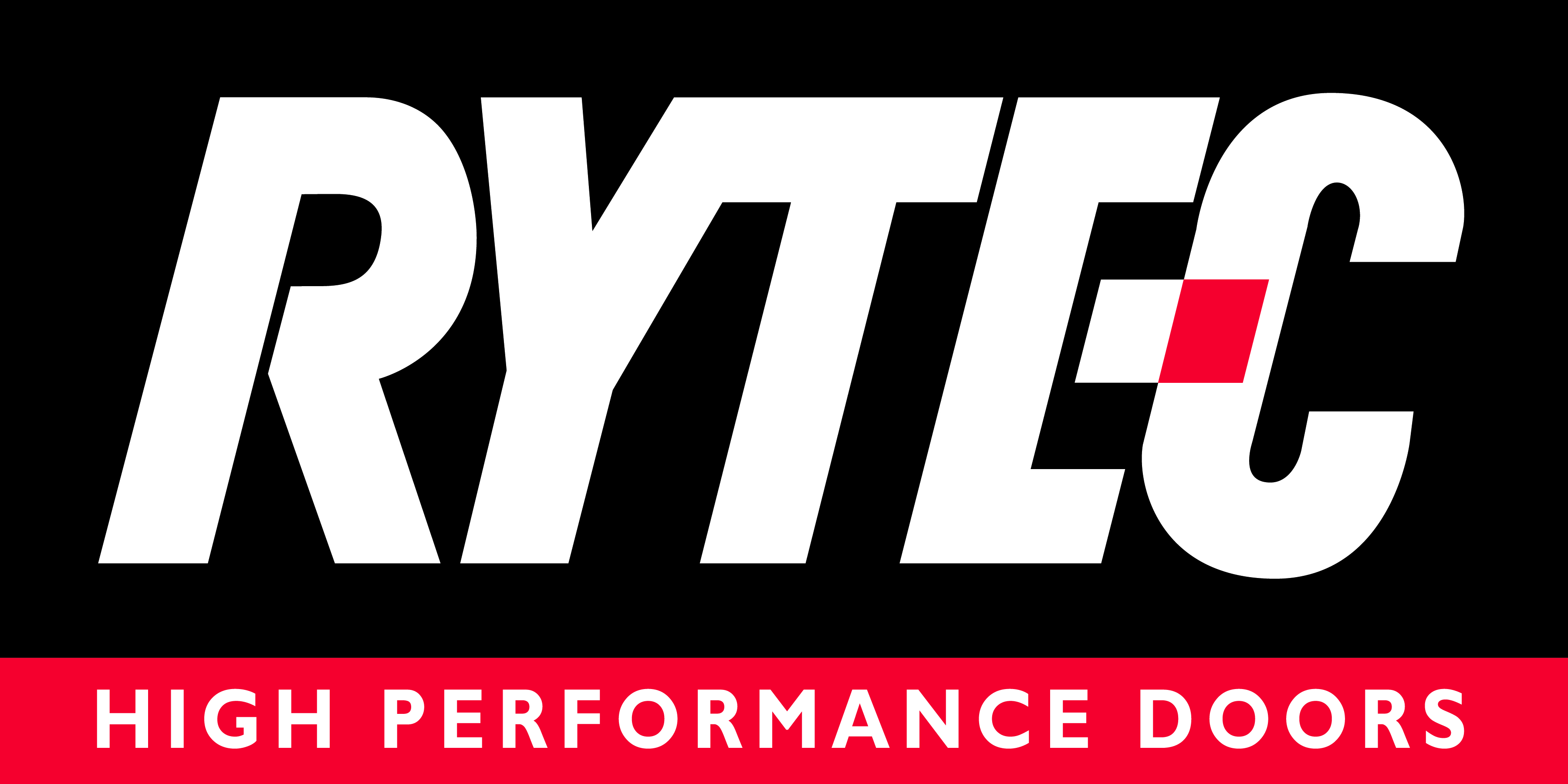
- Company type: Private
- Industry: Doors
- Founded: 1985
- Headquarters: Jackson, Wisconsin, USA
- Number of locations: 50 (including regional offices)
- Key people: Don Grasso, CEO
- Products: Industrial, high-speed doors
- Website: http://www.rytecdoors.com

Rytec Corporation is an American manufacturer of high-cycle, high-speed doors for industrial and commercial applications. Headquartered in Jackson, Wisconsin, Rytec is considered a North American leader in the development, manufacture and sale of high-performance doors.

== Overview ==
In 1985, Paul Reilly Jr. founded Rytec Corporation in Addison, Illinois. Under a license agreement with Labex GmbH (which later became a division of the Hörmann Group), Rytec manufactured and sold high-speed folding doors in the United States. Widespread adoption of this product in cold storage environments helped establish the viability of the high-speed door concept in North America. In 1987, Rytec moved to a larger facility on Eagle Drive in Jackson, Wisconsin. Several years later, in 1990, Rytec developed the first high-speed rolling door that could withstand accidental impacts and reset without tools.

Donald P. Grasso and Fred L. Turner purchased Rytec Corporation in 1994. In 1996, Rytec built a new a facility on Cedar Parkway in Jackson, Wisconsin, which was subsequently expanded in 2001 and 2006. This expanded facility increased manufacturing capacity and included a research and development facility with a wind tunnel for door testing. As of 2013, Don Grasso is the principal shareholder, Chairman and CEO.

In January 2018, Rytec purchased the former Steel Craft building in Hartford, Wisconsin, which signals a major product expansion.

== Recognition ==
In 1994, the Wisconsin Society of Professional Engineers presented Rytec with the Governor's New Products Award. That same year, the company received its first of 5 Plant Engineering magazine's Product of the Year awards for product innovation. It was recognized in Professional Door Dealer magazine's Best of Business poll as Best High-Speed Doors in 2010, 2011 and 2012; Best Green Products in 2011; and Most Innovative Products in 2012.
