= William O. Munsell House =

Historic building in Portland, Oregon, U.S.

- U.S. National Register of Historic Places
- Portland Historic Landmark
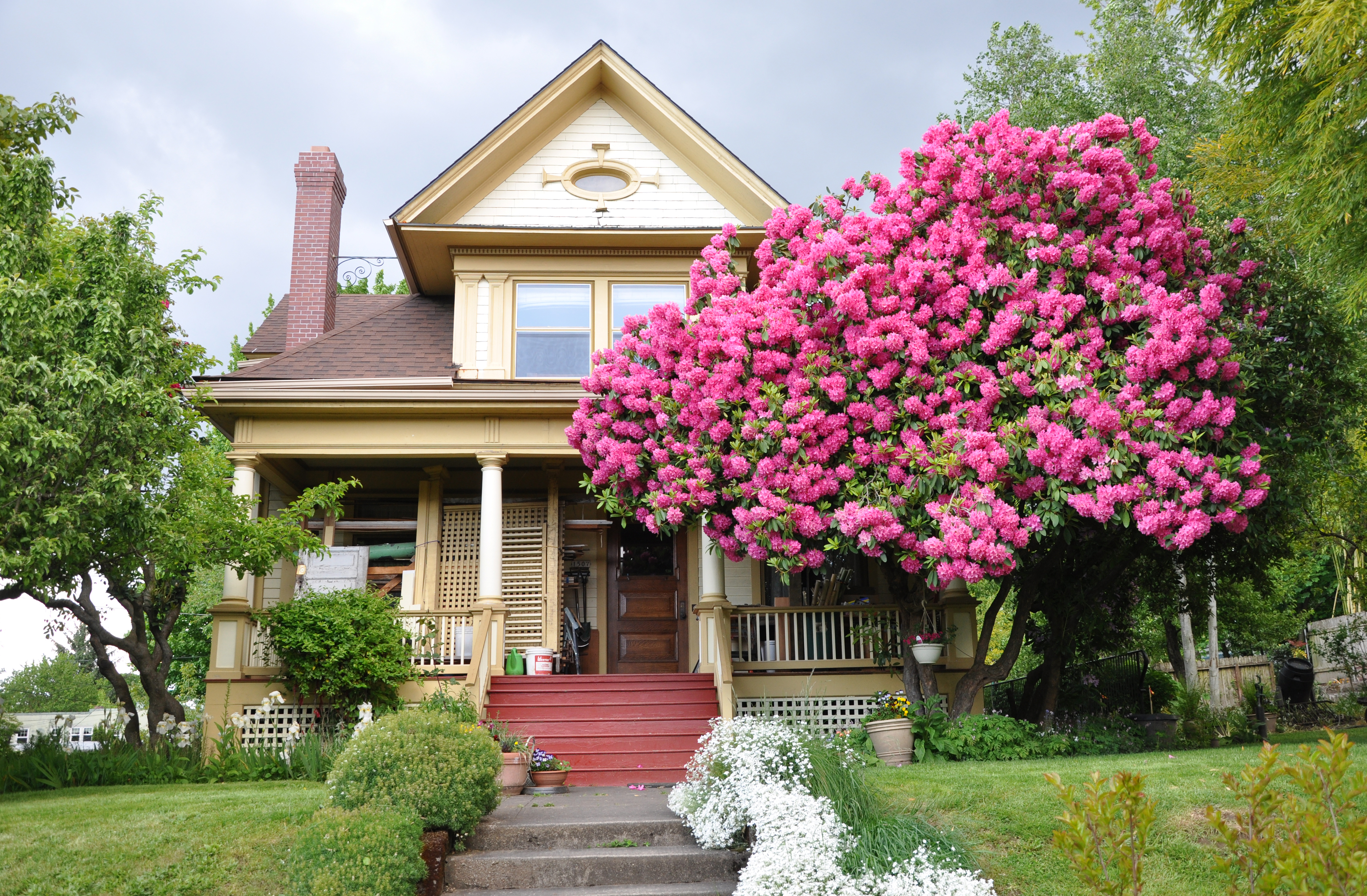
- William O. Munsell House in 2011
- Location: 1507 SE Alder Street; Portland, Oregon
- Coordinates: 45°31′05″N 122°39′01″W
- Built: 1902
- Architectural style: Bungalow/Craftsman, Colonial Revival
- MPS: Portland Oregon's Eastside Historic and Architectural Resources, 1850-1938
- NRHP reference No.: 89000080
- Added to NRHP: March 8, 1989

The William O. Munsell House in southeast Portland in the U.S. state of Oregon is a 1.5-story single dwelling listed on the National Register of Historic Places. Built in an eclectic mixture of Bungalow, American Craftsman, and Colonial Revival styles in 1902, it was added to the register in 1989.

Situated on the western edge of a proposed Buckman Historic District, the Munsell House features large pedimented gable dormers facing the cardinal points. The oval window in the facade dormer includes ornamental keystones, also facing the cardinal points, in the manner of many Colonial Revival structures. Houses similar to this one were built throughout southeast Portland from about 1900 through 1926.

The home's interior has four rooms on the main floor and three on the second floor. Interior features include an open staircase with turned balusters, pocket doors, dual fireplaces in the living and dining rooms, and an oriel window.

Munsell, the home's original owner, lived in it for two years before selling it to Henry B. and Ellen Adams. Born in Indiana, Munsell moved to Portland in 1896. Starting as a clerk for Acme Harvester, by 1932 he had become president and manager of Mitchell, Lewis and Staver, a farm-implement business in Portland's eastside warehouse district.

== See also ==
- National Register of Historic Places listings in Southeast Portland, Oregon
