= Tea boy =

Tea boy or teaboy may refer to:

- The equivalent to a Tea lady
- An alternate phrase for Ned (Scottish), a derogatory term for a hooligan or petty criminal
- Colloquial term for an entry-level office job, similar to a McJob
- Tape op, a worker performing menial tasks in a recording studio
