= George E. Birge House =

Historic house in Centralia, Washington

- U.S. National Register of Historic Places
- Washington State Heritage Register
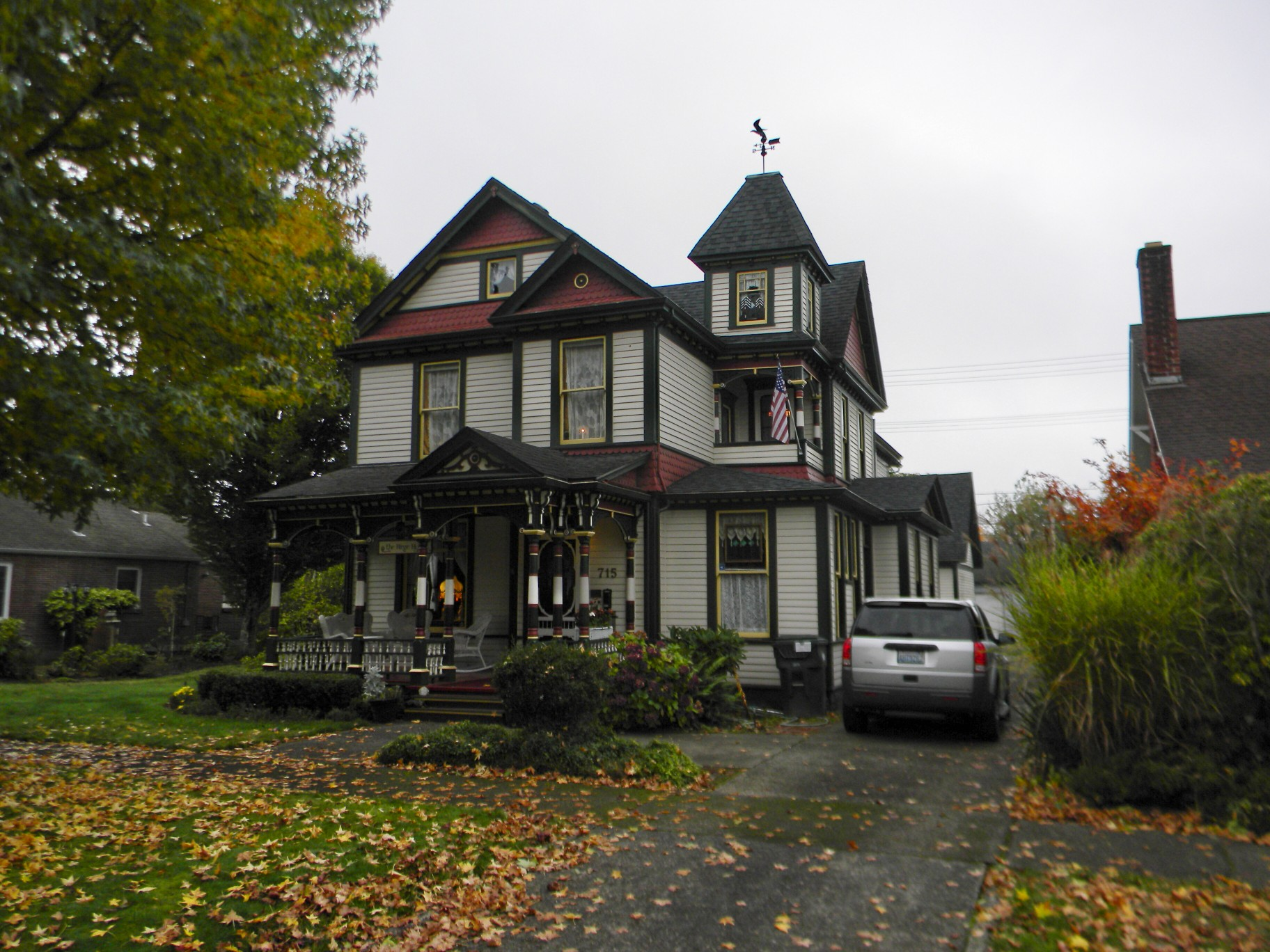
- George E. Birge House

- Location within Washington (state)
- Location: 715 E Street, Centralia, Washington
- Coordinates: 46°43′26″N 122°57′20″W
- Area: less than one acre
- Built: 1893 (approx.)
- Architectural style: Queen Anne
- NRHP reference No.: 86003375

Significant dates
- Added to NRHP: December 1, 1986
- Designated WSHR: December 1, 1986

The George E. Birge House is a historical residence located in the Edison District of Centralia, Washington and has been listed on the National Register of Historic Places since 1986. The Queen Anne-style home was built by George Birge in the mid-1890s. Birge was a noted Lewis County, Washington businessman, particularly in timber. The historic, asymmetrical house, known for its turret and exterior color scheme, has remained a private residence during its lifetime.

== History ==
The George E. Birge House was built approximately in the mid-1890s (Note: The exact year of the Birge House construction varies among several sources as specifically 1890 or between 1893 and 1895. Based on tax records, the land was not purchased until 1893. See sources within the section.) by George Edward Birge, a local businessman and public servant noted for his role in the region's lumber industry. The parcel of land, consisting of three lots, was once part of a 320-acre (130 ha) donation land claim known as either the Holmes Donation Claim or more commonly, the Lewis County Farm. The grounds were originally bought by Birge's wife, Lizzie, in 1893.

Following Birge's death, Lizzie sold the home to Byrd Thompson in 1910. The home came under the ownership of the Freeman family who began a rehabilitation of the historic residence, having their efforts published in several news articles and home restoration journals.

The home was of use as a free bed and breakfast for missionaries beginning under the Jones family ownership, who purchased the Birge House in 1993. During the 2000s and 2010s, the residence was often part of home tours in Centralia.

=== George E. Birge ===
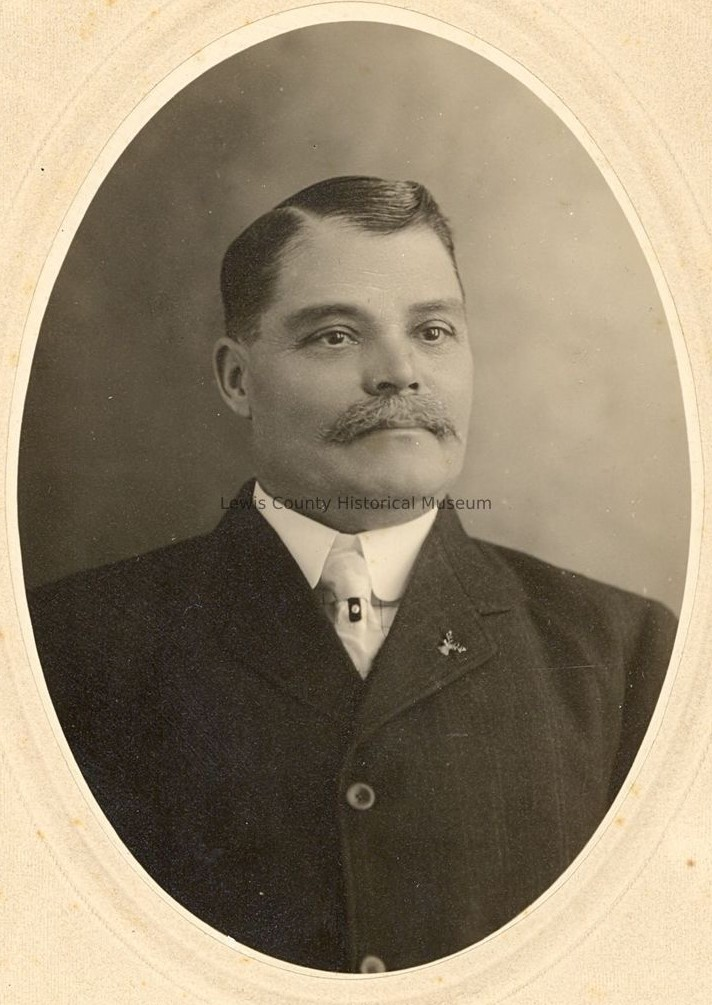
Portrait of George E. Birge

George Edward Birge was born on December 30, 1855 in Horicon, Wisconsin living there through high school, eventually moving to work with his father in Appleton. He moved to Clay Center, Nebraska in 1878 where he began a savings and loan in 1880. He remained as a banker in Clay Center until 1899, moving to the state of Washington when he began opening or investing in several lumber companies and mills. Residing in Centralia and successful in his endeavors, he was elected to lead several lumber agencies that oversaw the cooperation and financial success of the timber industry throughout most of central and western Lewis County. Birge served two terms as Centralia's mayor in 1894 and 1895 (Note: Other sources state that Birge served three terms as Centralia's mayor.) and participated in numerous social clubs, including as president of a bicycle club. He continued to invest and manage a variety of banks, businesses, lumber companies and mills, as well as oversight of multiple economic organizations, over the remainder of his life.

Birge was married to Lizzie B. Thurber in 1882 and they had two children. Their daughter, Mabel, was married in the home in October 1909. Birge died from a blood cot after a battle with typhoid fever (Note: While Birge's death is recorded as being due to typhoid, later reporting mentions yellow fever.) at his historic home on December 26, 1909. It was suspected that he contacted typhoid because the home's water supply and outhouse were too close in proximity. Funeral services were held at the house and the viewing and burial were attended by several hundred people. Almost the entirety of Centralia's businesses shut down for the day, although no city-wide closure was officially organized.

== Geography ==
The house is situated in the Miller Addition of the Edison District located within Centralia, Washington. The home is considered a private residence. The Birge House is situated in the middle of a block featuring late 19th and early 20th century-style homes, including American Craftsman and Tudor Revival architecture. Despite an attempt in the 2000s to list the Edison neighborhood and other historic homes on the register, as of 2024, the Birge House and the Hubbard Bungalow are the only structures in the Edison District to be listed on the NRHP.

== Architecture and features ==
Unless otherwise noted, the details provided are based on the 1986 National Register of Historic Places (NRHP) nomination form and may not reflect updates or changes to the George E. Birge House in the interim.

The George E. Birge House is a 2 1/2-story, Queen Anne-style home. The residence has been described as containing the styles seen in Italianate architecture, Eastlake stick-style, and Victorian architecture. The wood framed residence rests on a Tenino sandstone foundation which includes a small basement. The basement may have been used as servants quarters. The footprint is mostly rectangular and the home has attached additions, though considered non-intrusive and do not impede the structural integrity of the main building. At some point under the Birge family's occupancy, the home's northeast corner was expanded for an office and to enlarge a music room. The extension, notable from the front, is considered compatible to the original design of the house and is suspected, due to the existing fixtures in the rooms and noticeable foundation differences, to have been constructed in the 1900s.

=== Exterior ===
The roof is situated above a high cross gable with a pyramidal turret in the northeast corner. At the time of the NRHP nomination, the wood shingles on the roof were replicated to match those on the home in the 1920s. The exterior walls contains a boxed cornice and repeated decoration of a dentil band frieze. The asymmetrical structure is pronounced due to several projecting pediment gables. Cladding includes a mixture of clapboard, endboards, and fish scale shingles. Decorative moldings and posts on the front porch augment the curved curvilinear arches and a pediment gable at the front entrance. Continuing an overall theme to the exterior of the building, the porch is adorned with a boxed cornice and frieze, and decorative brackets. A matching side porch lacks a balustrade, which was replaced with a boxed railing covered in fish scale shingles.

A covered porch with continuing curved arches run the length of the front of the house supported by simple-turned posts. The balustrade, with a stacked row of spindles, was replaced and replicated during the Freeman family ownership. The balcony below the turret combines the similar design of both porch entrances. The second story landing was known as a "consumption porch", a spot usually used as a private space to help people with tuberculosis access fresh air.

Additional design elements are located on the vergeboards of the front façade and a bullseye motif is repeated between the second floor gable and the front porch.

Casements are considered simple, with one-over-one double-hung windows with two transoms located on the first floor. The turret contains six-over-one windows and the second story gable includes a single light opening. Diamond-paned lead glass windows, not original to the home, are located at the office room when the floor plan was modified during the Birge ownership. At the time of the NRHP nomination, five of the six exterior doors were original to the Birge House, and all contain some recessed glass panel. The doors accessed via the side porch contain transoms. The front door is considered the most decorative, and it includes a transom and panels of recessed stained glass, etched glass, and carved wood.

Two additions at the back of the building are enclosed spaces, housing separate two-story porches as well as stairways that access either the basement or the upper floor.

The George E. Birge House was originally painted in a cream white with red trim, but at the time of the NRHP nomination, the exterior was adorned in a color scheme of teal blue and cream, with accents painted in wine red and white. Birge had the home repainted in 1908 but the colors used are not mentioned.

=== Interior ===
The main floor has been mostly unaltered since the days of the Birge family ownership with the exception of an added bathroom. Bronze hardware on the doors and windows were original. The wood trim, with the exception of two casements around windows in the front parlor, remained in its initial state, stained and varnished without paint.

The entrance hall contains the main, curved stairway decorated with spindles and a carved newel post. The stairway is lighted by a patterned, single pane window. A double-leaf doorway, outfitted with a non-original but a period complimentary spindle work frieze, leads to the front parlor. Large pocket doors separate other rooms on the first floor and a back parlor contains a corner fireplace and a built-in bookcase featuring glass paneled doors. The bookcase, and fireplace mantel, differ in style from the rest of the home's woodwork, and they are thought to have been added at a later time. The office hosts a built-in cabinet. The back wall of the piece contains original clapboard and the cream white paint of the home's initial build. The room has a separate exterior door leading to conjecture that Birge may have used the space to conduct his business interests in the home.

The kitchen does not contain any original features mostly due to the need over the years to upgrade the space for more modern conveniences. Access to the later additions of the house can be made through the kitchen area.

The second floor's footprint was unaltered at the time of the NRHP nomination. Unlike the main floor, the woodwork and hardware on the second story had been painted. A bedroom on the northeast corner accesses the balcony under the turret. The turret is only accessible via a trapdoor located on the second story balcony.

=== Renovations and restorations ===
Beginning in the 1990s under the Jones family, the home underwent a continuing restoration project which included the use of historical paint colors and the refinishing and repairing of interior woodwork. A large room on the second level was split into two smaller spaces. During the long-term efforts, a pocket window was discovered on the second floor.

== Tourism ==
The Birge House has been a part of several home tours in Centralia, including the Dickens of A Christmas Historic Homes Tour in the 2000s.

== Significance ==
The George E. Birge House was added to the National Register of Historic Places and the Washington State Heritage Register on December 1, 1986. The residence was considered by the NRHP to be "an excellent, well preserved example of Queen Anne architecture adapted to a small city residential setting." The asymmetrical appearance brought out by the architectural style and decorative motifs were the most considered part of the NRHP nomination. The home is recognized as the only structure in Centralia containing styles of Italianate architecture.
