= McJob =

Pejorative work-related slang

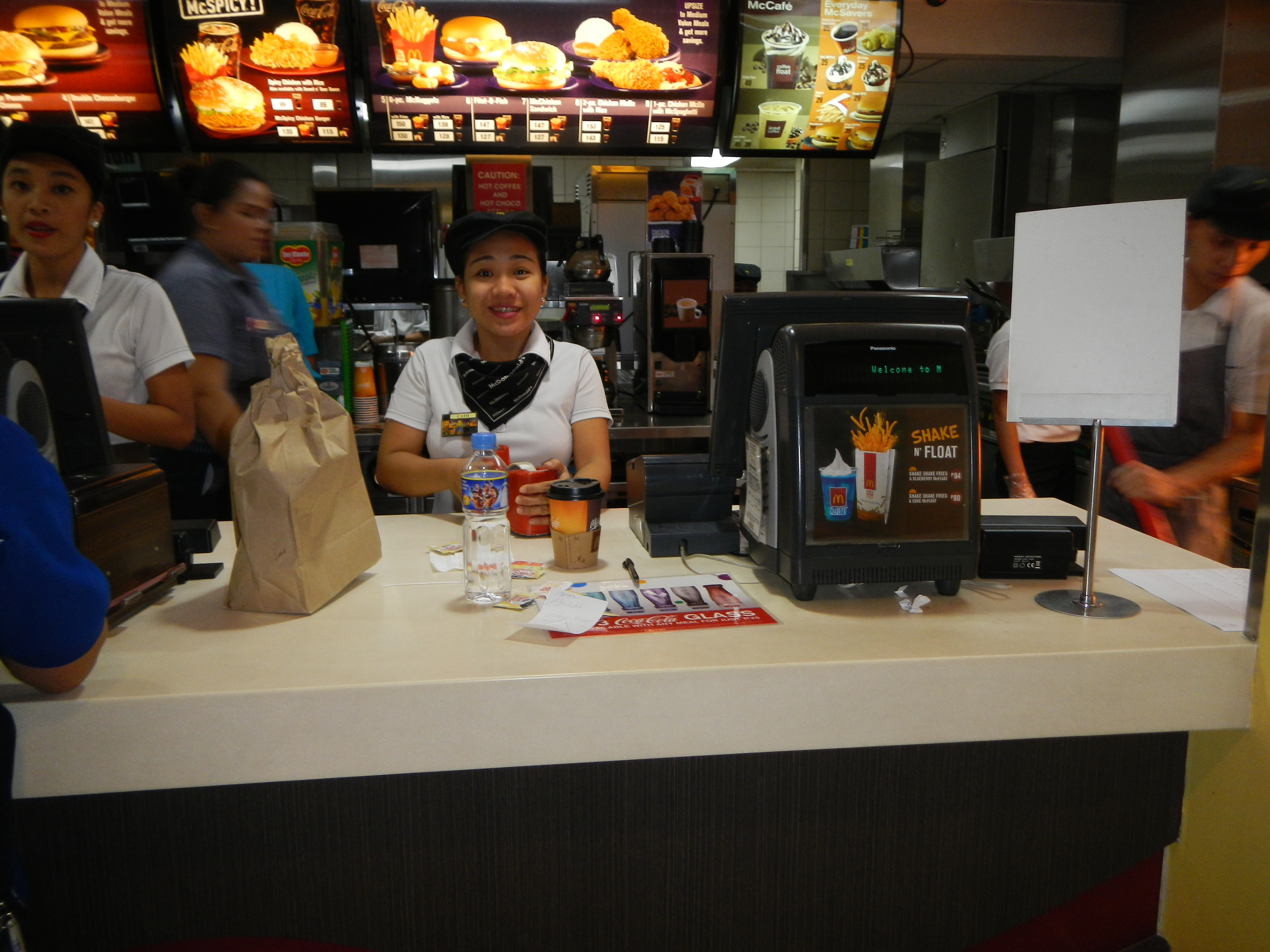
McDonald's staff in Quezon City, Philippines

"McJob" is a slang term for a low-paying, low-prestige dead-end job that requires few skills and offers very little chance of advancement. The term "McJob" comes from the name of the fast-food restaurant McDonald's, but is used to describe any low-status job – regardless of employer – where little training is required, staff turnover is high, and workers' activities are tightly regulated by managers.

== History ==
"McJob" was in use at least as early as 1986 — it appears in an article by sociologist Amitai Etzioni — and the Oxford English Dictionary defines it as "[a]n unstimulating, low-paid job with few prospects, esp. one created by the expansion of the service sector". Lack of job security is common.

The term was popularized by Douglas Coupland's 1991 novel Generation X: Tales for an Accelerated Culture, which described a "McJob" as a "low-pay, low-prestige, low-dignity, low benefit, no-future job in the service sector. Frequently considered a satisfying career choice by people who have never held one".

In the face of objections from McDonald's, the term "McJob" was added to Merriam-Webster's Collegiate Dictionary in 2003. In an open letter to Merriam-Webster, McDonald's CEO, James Cantalupo denounced the definition as a "slap in the face" to all restaurant employees, and stated that "a more appropriate definition of a 'McJob' might be 'teaches responsibility'". Merriam-Webster responded that "[they stood] by the accuracy and appropriateness of [their] definition".

On 20 March 2007, the BBC reported that the UK arm of McDonald's planned to launch a public petition to change the OED's definition of "McJob". Lorraine Homer from McDonald's stated that the company feels the definition is "out of date and inaccurate". McDonald's UK CEO, Peter Beresford, described the term as "demeaning to the hard work and dedication displayed by the 67,000 McDonald's employees throughout the UK". The company would prefer the definition to be rewritten to "reflect a job that is stimulating, rewarding ... and offers skills that last a lifetime".

These comments run counter to the principle that dictionaries record linguistic usage rather than judge it, and that dropping the entry for "McJob" would be a precedent for bowdlerising definitions of other derogatory terms. McDonald's attempted to get all of its workers to sign the petition, but many refused because the current definition is accurate despite the company's complaint.

During the aforementioned arguments that broke out when Merriam-Webster included "McJob" in its new edition, McDonald's officials implied the company might bring a lawsuit against the dictionary based on this trademark issue, but never did so. McDonald's disputes that its jobs are poor, because the company has been nominated for employee awards that are created by employers. However, this was contradicted in the outcome of the UK McLibel court case, in which the judges ruled that it was fair to say that McDonald's employees worldwide "do badly in terms of pay and conditions".

The term "McJOBS" was registered as a trademark by McDonald's in 1984 for "training handicapped persons as restaurant employees". The trademark lapsed in February 1992 and was declared canceled by the United States Patent and Trademark Office. Following the October 1992 publication of Generation X in paperback, McDonald's restored the trademark.

== Accuracy of the term ==
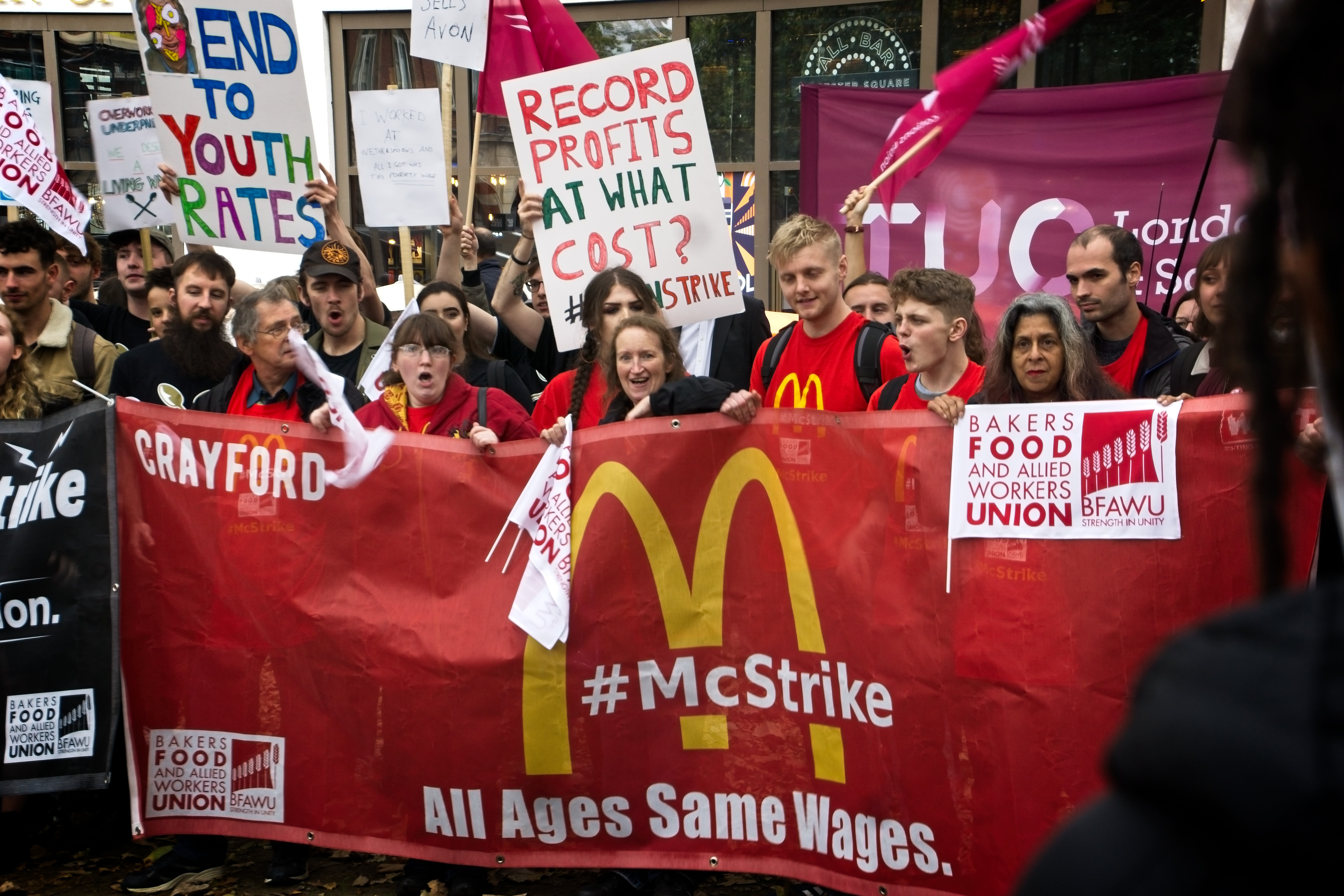
McDonald's workers striking against coercive labour practices and low wages, 2018

There are often wide variations in how workers are actually treated, depending on the local franchise owner. Some employees start in entry-level McJobs and later become assistant managers or managers, continuing to work at the same franchise for many years; however, this is the exception rather than the norm. McDonald's advertises that its former CEO, Jim Skinner, began working at the company as a regular restaurant employee, and that 20 of its top 50 managers began work as regular crew members.

According to Jim Cantalupo, former CEO of McDonald's, the perception of fast-food work as boring and mindless is inaccurate, and over 1,000 of the people who now own McDonald's franchises began their careers behind the counter. Because McDonald's has over 400,000 employees and high turnover, Cantalupo's contention has been criticized as being invalid, working to highlight the exception rather than the rule.

In 2006, McDonald's undertook an advertising campaign in the United Kingdom to challenge the perceptions of the McJob. The campaign, developed by Barkers Advertising and supported by research conducted by Adrian Furnham, professor of psychology at University College London, highlighted the benefits of working for the organization, stating that it was "Not bad for a McJob". The advertisements ran at London's Piccadilly Circus.

== See also ==
- Contingent work
- Critique of work
- Maxime, McDuff & McDo, a 2002 French documentary about the unionization of a McDonald's in Montreal
- McWords
- My Secret Life on the McJob, a 2006 book describing management lessons learned by the author, Jerry Newman, when he worked undercover in several fast food venues
- Permatemp
- Poverty
- Working poor
- Zero-hour contract, some businesses participate in, whereby work is not guaranteed, but employees must be available for work on short notice, unlike contingent work (or casual contract), where employees must be given ample notice, and have the right to refuse guaranteed minimum hours of work.
