= Hubbard Bungalow =

Historic house in Centralia, Washington

- U.S. National Register of Historic Places
- Washington State Heritage Register
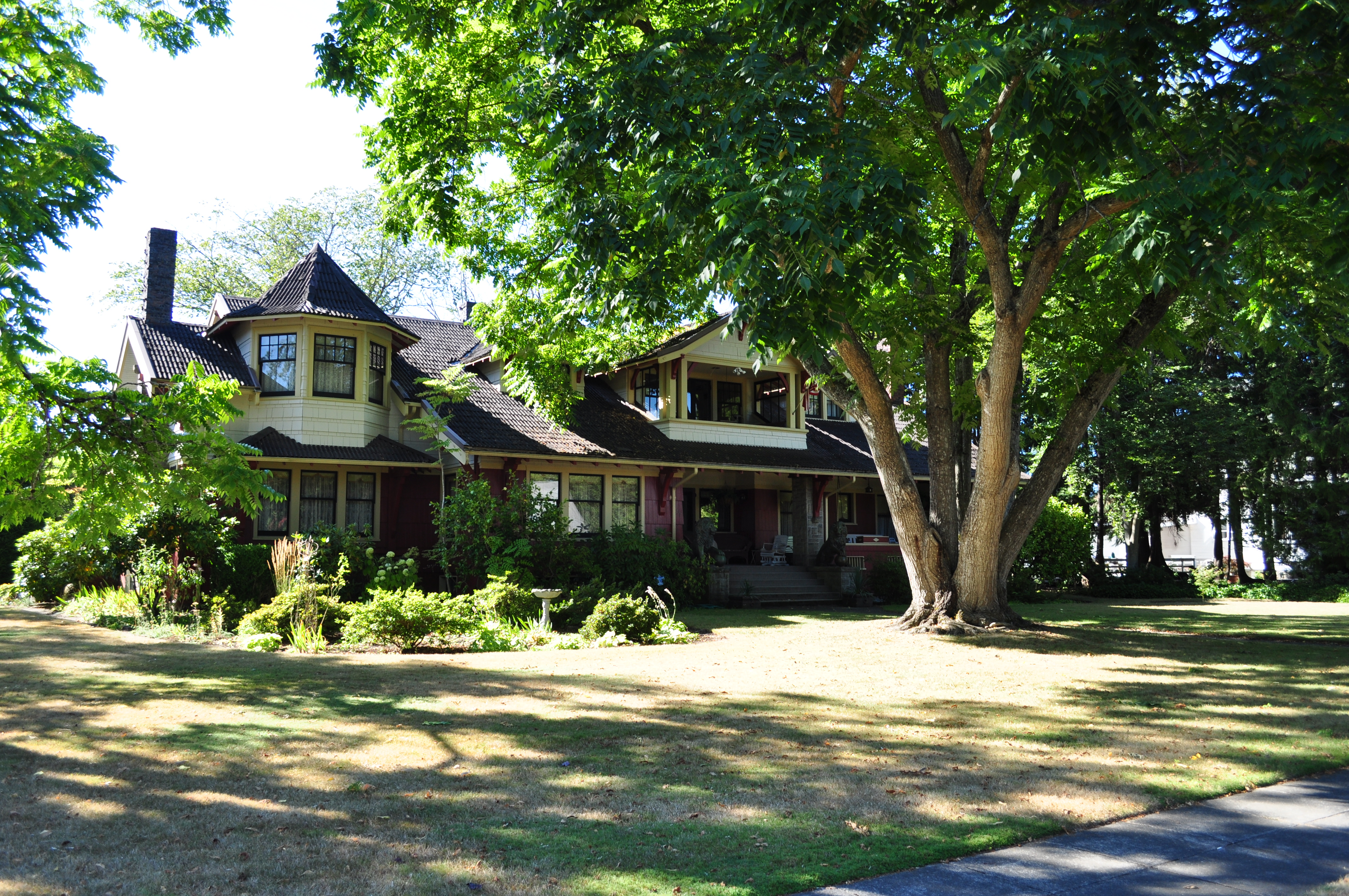
- Hubbard Bungalow

- Location within Washington (state)
- Location: 717 N. Washington Avenue, Centralia, Washington
- Coordinates: 46.72325°N 122.96092°W
- Area: less than one acre
- Built: 1908
- Built by: J.C. Dickson
- Architect: George W. Bullard
- Architectural style: Bungalow/Craftsman
- MPS: Properties Associated with Centralia Armistice Day, 1919
- NRHP reference No.: 05000922

Significant dates
- Added to NRHP: August 24, 2005
- Designated WSHR: 1998

The Hubbard Bungalow is a private, historic residence in Centralia, Washington that has been listed on the National Register of Historic Places since 2005. The home is located in the city's historic Edison District.

Completed in 1908, the 4,000 foot (1,200 metres) bungalow was home to Francis Hubbard, a prominent Centralia businessman in the region's lumber and railroad industries. Hubbard was also known for his role that led to the Centralia Tragedy and the home is subsequently recognized by the National Register of Historic Places for the connection.

The bungalow is mostly under the style of the Arts and Crafts movement, including built-ins, lead glass windows, and extensive woodwork. Several features stemming from the Victorian architectural era are present in the home, such as an octagonal turret and interior murals and stencils. Hubbard had the home built strictly using local materials, including special lumber stock from his mills, so the residence could boast that it was made entirely in Washington state.

== History ==
Built for Francis and Mina Hubbard, an entire block for the home was purchased by September 1905 and construction of the Hubbard Bungalow, estimated to cost $5,000, began on August 20, 1907. The home was completed in 1908. The home was designed in the Arts and Crafts movement, a popular architectural style of the time. The bungalow was designed by George Wesley Bullard of the newly formed architecture firm, Bullard & Hill, based in Tacoma. The house is considered likely to be one of the first projects undertaken by Bullard & Hill. The firm hired J.C. Dickson, a retired Tacoma builder then residing in Centralia, to oversee the construction. The landscape architect was Ebenezer R. Roberts, who was a prior superintendent of the Tacoma Park System. The interior decorator was Seattle-based Charles Weissenborn.

Hubbard demanded that the home be built of local materials, such as clay and stone, so he could declare the house to be an "all Washington product". All timber, with the exception of some flooring, was chosen from stock at his timber mill. After the project was completed, the Hubbard Bungalow received acclaim in a 1908 issue of the Pacific Engineer and Builder. The Centralia News-Examiner printed the issue's review of the home in full, with the report providing drawings of the floor plan. His daughter and her husband, also a lumberman, lived in a house adjoining the bungalow property.

The home had perhaps five or six owners over the course of its existence by the time it was nominated for listing on the National Register of Historic Places (NRHP). An automobile dealer, H.D. Gingrich, purchased the bungalow in 1932, selling the residence just two years later to Fred Powell, a member of a regional distribution firm. At the time of the NRHP nomination, ownership of the residence was under the Veach family, who had undertaken restorations to remove extensions and replace parts of the home to its original 1908 style.

=== Francis B. Hubbard ===
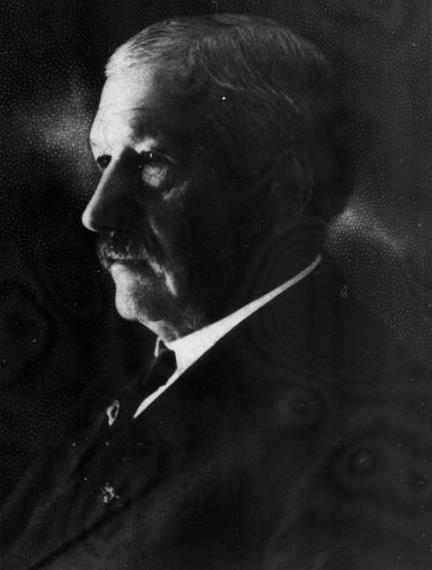
Francis B. Hubbard, ca. 1913

Francis Hubbard was a prominent and powerful lumber and railroad baron in Centralia, heading the Eastern Railway and Lumber Company. He was born in New York on November 5, 1847, (Note: Sources report Hubbard was born in 1849, often without a specific date, and mention his birth location as either in Cottage or Dayton, New York. See sources in section.) moving to Kalamazoo, Michigan to work for the Michigan Central Railroad when he was 20 years old. He worked in joint cooperation with Western Union Telegraph for roughly ten years. Hubbard married Mina Tuttle on October 1, 1873; the pair had two children and lived for three years in Michigan City, Indiana.

After a near 10-year tenure in Brainerd, Minnesota beginning in 1891 where Hubbard worked as a superintendent, and eventually as chief lineman, for Northern Pacific Railroad's telegraph and telephone sector, the family moved to McCormick, Washington in 1900. He helped to establish the namesake of the town, the McCormick Lumber Company, with Harry McCormick. Hubbard organized the Rock Creek Lumber Company in nearby Walville in 1902. Both companies produced crossarms used in telegraph and telephone poles and Rock Creek was noted, for a time, as being the largest crossarm manufacturer in the state. Selling his interests, he began a new lumber company in Doty in 1905. Hubbard shifted his attention in 1908 to concentrate on the oversight of his business venture in Centralia, the Eastern Railway & Lumber Company (ER&LC).

The ER&LC was first begun on May 9, 1903 in partnership with several influential businessmen in the county. Despite the name, the company was first and foremost a lumber mill. The 30-acre (12 ha) mill, at its peak having landholdings of 500,000,000 feet (152,400,000.0 m) of timber, was able to produce 125,000 board feet and 250,000 shingles per day. The company expanded with several logging camps and the purchasing of right of ways, eventually building rail lines from their woodland holdings to the mill. The combined peak number of employees exceeded 500 and the ER&LC was valued at $1.5 million, becoming recognized as one of the largest timber companies in Southwest Washington and a major economic force in Centralia.

Hubbard's respect as a businessman led him to serve on a variety of associations and boards, particularly in finance and timber, and in several social clubs, such as the Benevolent and Protective Order of Elks and Knights Templar. He had ownership stakes in various other bank, railroad, and real estate companies. He was the founding president of the Southwest Washington Fair, elected unanimously despite declining the initial offer. He remained the only president of the fair until his death on August 18, 1927, caused by a long illness.

=== Connection to the Centralia Tragedy ===
Hubbard was connected to the November 11, 1919 Centralia Tragedy, also known as the Centralia Massacre or Armistice Day Riot, due to his anti-union stance and subsequent legal run-ins with Elmer Smith, the leader of the Centralia chapter of the Industrial Workers of the World (IWW). He was also an uncle to Dale Hubbard, a member of the American Legion, who was shot during the riot and died later that evening. Francis Hubbard, although not directly mentioned during the legal proceedings held in the aftermath of the violent event, was head of the Employers Association at the time and was reported as being against any form of labor unions for some time, his opposition speculated as bordering on "fanaticism".

He may have helped organize a raid on the IWW hall on the previous Armistice Day in 1918, a major known precursor of the Centralia Massacre. Hubbard attended and made opening remarks at an Elks Lodge meeting titled, "Discuss Handling of 'Wobbly' Problem", remarking that the IWW was "a menace and should be driven out of town". Despite attempts by others to calm the meeting, Hubbard was reported as furious and outraged, stating that if he were the chief of police, that he would have the Wobblies (Note: "Wobbly" or "Wobblies" are non-pejorative nicknames for members of the Industrial Workers of the World (IWW). The origin of the moniker remains uncertain.) run out of town in 24-hours.

Hubbard became one of the founding members of a secret committee, known as the Citizens' Protective League. Officially organized a month before the Armistice Day Riot, Hubbard served as the inaugural treasurer. The league's purpose was to protect the "fair names" of the city's prominent opponents of the IWW. The committee's actions has been considered a crucial driver that led to the violence of the Centralis Tragedy. Despite Hubbard's open involvement against the Wobblies, he was never questioned during the judicial proceedings held in the aftermath. During the 1920 trial against IWW members connected to the riot, Hubbard's name and his whereabouts during the lynching of Wesley Everest were briefly brought up but a state prosecutor, also acting as Hubbard's attorney, objected to the line of questioning. Information on Hubbard's involvement during the violence remained unknown.

Although the Hubbard Bungalow had no involvement in the events of the November 11, 1919 incident, the home has been included as part of the NRHP's Multiple Property Documentation Form, "Properties Associated with Centralia Armistice Day, 1919", due to meeting certain requirements for the connection to either persons or legacy associated with the riot.

== Geography ==
The Hubbard Bungalow is located in Centralia, Washington in the historic Edison District. The home is situated in the middle of a block, facing east on a flat lot. The Edison neighborhood contained the residences of Centralia's most prominent members in the late 19th to early 20th century, such as the NRHP-listed George E. Birge House.

== Architecture and features ==
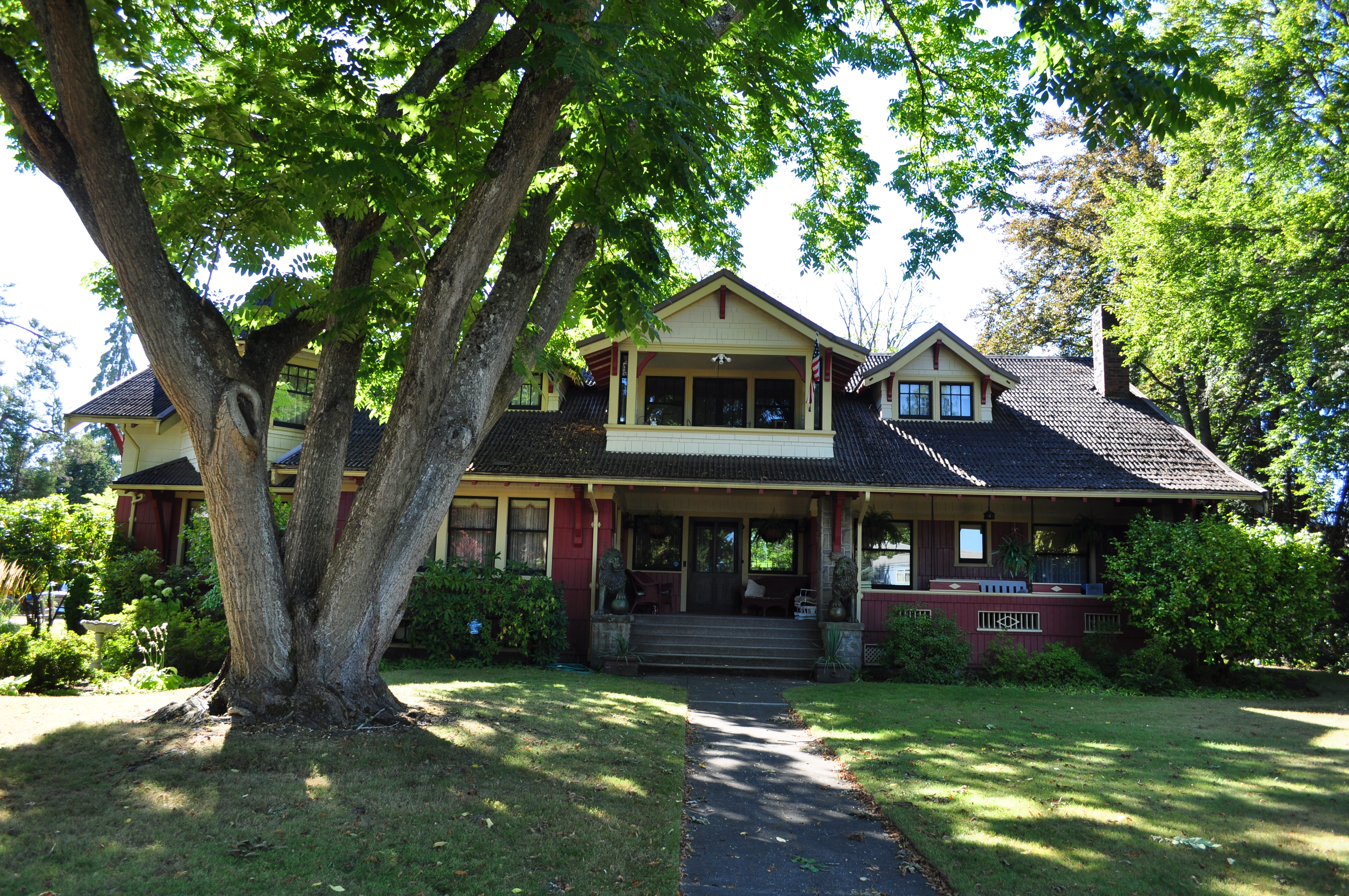
Front view, Hubbard Bungalow, 2012

Unless otherwise noted, the details provided are based on the 2005 National Register of Historic Places (NRHP) nomination form and may not reflect updates or changes to the Hubbard Bungalow in the interim.

=== Exterior ===
The 1 1/2 home was constructed during the beginning of the Arts and Crafts movement and the structure contains several elements of the architectural style, such as a low profile and rectangular footprint. The layout is slightly irregular and measures 80 feet (24.4 m) long by 50 feet (15.2 m) wide. A basement includes an additional 2,500 square feet (230 m^{2}). The home is wood-framed over a concrete foundation that is trimmed in sandstone. The home was built on a single block with frontage considered "extensive" and an overall "imposing appearance". The home is often referred to as a "bungaloid".

The roof features several gables with three dormers featured on the front of the home and a shed-style dormer at the rear. Oversized knee braces are located under large, overhanging eaves. This combination provides expansive coverage for the front and side porch entrances. At the time of the NRHP nomination, the original wood shingles on the canopy had been replaced by a lightweight, corrugated roof made of organic fibers. Known as Onduline roofing, the material was developed in Europe during the 1940s.

The front façade is known for an octagonal bay window and turret that features a conical roof on the second story. A hip roof, with braces, supports the window. The design elements are usually not associated with the Arts and Crafts style, and along with formal features in the interior, are considered a Victorian architecture element. An inset front porch dominates the main entrance of the home on its northern point. The covered entryway is supported by large, square sandstone columns that lead to a wide stairway bordered by a stone stem wall. The wide front door, at the time of the NRHP nomination, still contained the original screen door.

A variety of windows, including one-over-one and eight-over-one casements, as well as six single pane, are featured on the home. The house also has a lead glass window and a diamond paned window in the sun room.

Three chimneys are located on the bungalow, one each at the ends of the home and one located at the ridgeline. The ridgeline chimney is built of brick while the northern, asymmetrical smokestack and the southern, symmetrical flue were constructed to match, with a combination of brick, clinker brick, and sandstone construction.

At the time of the NRHP nomination, the landscaping was considered minimal but a large butternut tree was recognized in the front yard. No original landscape features designed by Ebenezer Roberts was able to be documented.

=== Interior ===
The home contains five bedrooms and 2 1/4 bathrooms. Additional rooms include a butler's pantry, library, reception room, and sunroom. Ten walk-in closets and three fireplaces are also noted. The main floor plan has remained in its original layout.

The main door into the foyer is a beveled-glass entryway with flanking lead glass windows. The foyer features several Art and Craft touches including box beams and stenciling. Off the foyer is the reception room that contains several original features such as the center light fixture adorned by hand-painted roses on the ceiling. A hallway leading from the reception area contains original burlap wallpaper and lighting. Access out of the reception into the hallway was most likely remodeled in the 1930s, providing a different access point to the primary bedroom.

The main bedroom features a sitting room with Rookwood tile and a fireplace which is flanked by a window seat to the left and a built-in bookcase with lead glass doors to the right. The windows by the fireplace are diamond-patterned lead glass. The room's private bath contains the original oval-shaped pedestal sink and floor tile, a blue and white octagonal pattern. An etched window panel door leads from the bath to the hallway.

The living room also contains box beams, with decorative paintings of urns and roses in each recess. The room's fireplace is decorated in green, 6-inch (15-centimetre) Grueby tile and the space also includes original light fixtures and cast iron heaters. The library is located off the living room and access is gained through a large, fir pocket door. Box beams, with Art and Crafts-style stenciled works in the recesses, also adorn the ceiling in the library. The room is decorated with 5 foot (1.5 metres) wainscotting, a chair rail, and built-in bookcases with lead glass doors. The fireplace in the library, flanked by window seats, contains Grueby tile as well, though in a reddish color.

Another, but smaller, fir pocket door leads to the sunroom. Windows and glass doors take up most of the southern and western walls. The doors contains a muntin bar, with a large diamond in the top third of the glass pane. A coffered ceiling built of wide panels at intersecting angles, fir wall paneling, and a diamond-patterned glass pocket door leading to the dining room round out the sunroom, considered under the NRHP nomination as innovative for the time.

The dining room, similar to other large rooms in the bungalow, contains a box beam ceiling. Walls are done in lath and plaster. A swing door leads to the kitchen and butler's pantry, which contain original cabinetry. The pantry and kitchen were expanded when a rear porch was enclosed in the 1930s. A small kitchen nook resides at the original location of the pantry. The original kitchen was painted in pearl gray over canvas; the trim was painted the same color. The kitchen includes a doorbell that recognizes which entrance is being used and a "maid's bell station", which was of use to summon maids and servants from different rooms in the home.

An Arts & Crafts grand staircase leads from the foyer to the second floor. The panel balustrades feature cutouts in a "smile-design" and a first floor newel post supports a bronze statue of a woman dressed in light fabric holding a grape vine. The NRHP form considered the artwork to be "reminiscent of bacchanalian revelry". The sculpture, by way of an attached plaque on the artwork's base, is titled, La Nuit, a French word translated as, "The Night". The 16-step stairwell is in a dogleg configuration and leads first to a landing where a consumption porch can be accessed by a glass door, flanked by lead glass windows.

The second floor contains four bedrooms and a single bathroom. The room's ceilings are often angled due to the structure and layout of the roof. The smallest bedroom, most likely a room for a maid based on the original blueprints, contains a wall sink. The noted octagon bay window is featured in the largest bedroom, which also includes a small sitting room. A covered balcony is accessed via a French door through a small bedroom at the top of the staircase.

The laundry room, a 1/4 bath, and rooms for the boiler, canning, and workshop, are located in the basement.

At the time of the NRHP nomination, the Hubbard Bungalow was heated by the original hot water system that feeds into decorative or embossed radiators throughout the home. The woodwork in the residence, usually not straight-grained, was considered "equal if not superior to any on the coast at that time".

=== Outbuildings ===
The NRHP nomination also includes the home's two-car garage. The gabled garage matches the architectural style of the bungalow, with Onduline roofing and matching siding. The interior is paneled in bead board.

=== Renovations and restorations ===
The Hubbard Bungalow has undergone few renovations during its history. Outside of the 1930s changes to the kitchen, pantry, and small hallway, as well as the Onduline roof, the only noted major change is an extension of a gable roof over the front balcony on the second story. Other recognized alterations of the bungalow are minor renovations that include painting and removal of some bathroom tile and wainscotting throughout the home.

At the time of the NRHP nomination, the owners were in the process of reversing some of the alterations, with exception of the kitchen area, but plans to begin a kitchen remodel began in 2010. The Veach family removed two walls, in the reception room and foyer, opening the space back to its original 1908 layout. The bungalow, by the beginning ownership period of the Veach family, had shag carpeting and indoor-outdoor carpeting in spaces on the first floor, and several layers of paint over trim and wainscotting; all alterations were removed. Original wall sconces were missing and most of the ceiling stencils needed to be restored. By late-2010, only the painted-over ceiling stencils in the dining room remained to be reclaimed.

== Tourism ==
The Hubbard Bungalow is a private residence that has been a part of several home tours in Centralia, including the Dickens of A Christmas Historic Homes Tour in the 2000s and early 2010s.

== Significance ==
The National Register of Historic Places placed emphasis on the Hubbard Bungalow's connection to Francis Hubbard, his economic prominence, and his role in the lead up to the Centralia Tragedy. The home's Arts and Crafts style was considered by the nomination as embodying the "distinctive characteristics" of the movement. The bungalow's architect and contractor were also noted to be of importance as a representation of Bullard and Dickson's works. The Hubbard Bungalow was officially added to the NRHP list on August 24, 2005, becoming the eighth such listing in Centralia. The home had previously been added to the Washington State Heritage Register in 1998.

Early reviews remarked on the bungalow's "unique and attractive features", noting that the home deserved recognition beyond local notoriety and had more in common with high-end residences in Southern California at the time. The bungalow was declared as a first-class, "all-native-wood home".

The Hubbard Bungalow is matched by the NRHP sites, the statue, The Sentinel and the Wesley Everest Gravesite for their connections to the Armistice Day Riot.
