= McCafé =

McDonald's coffee bar

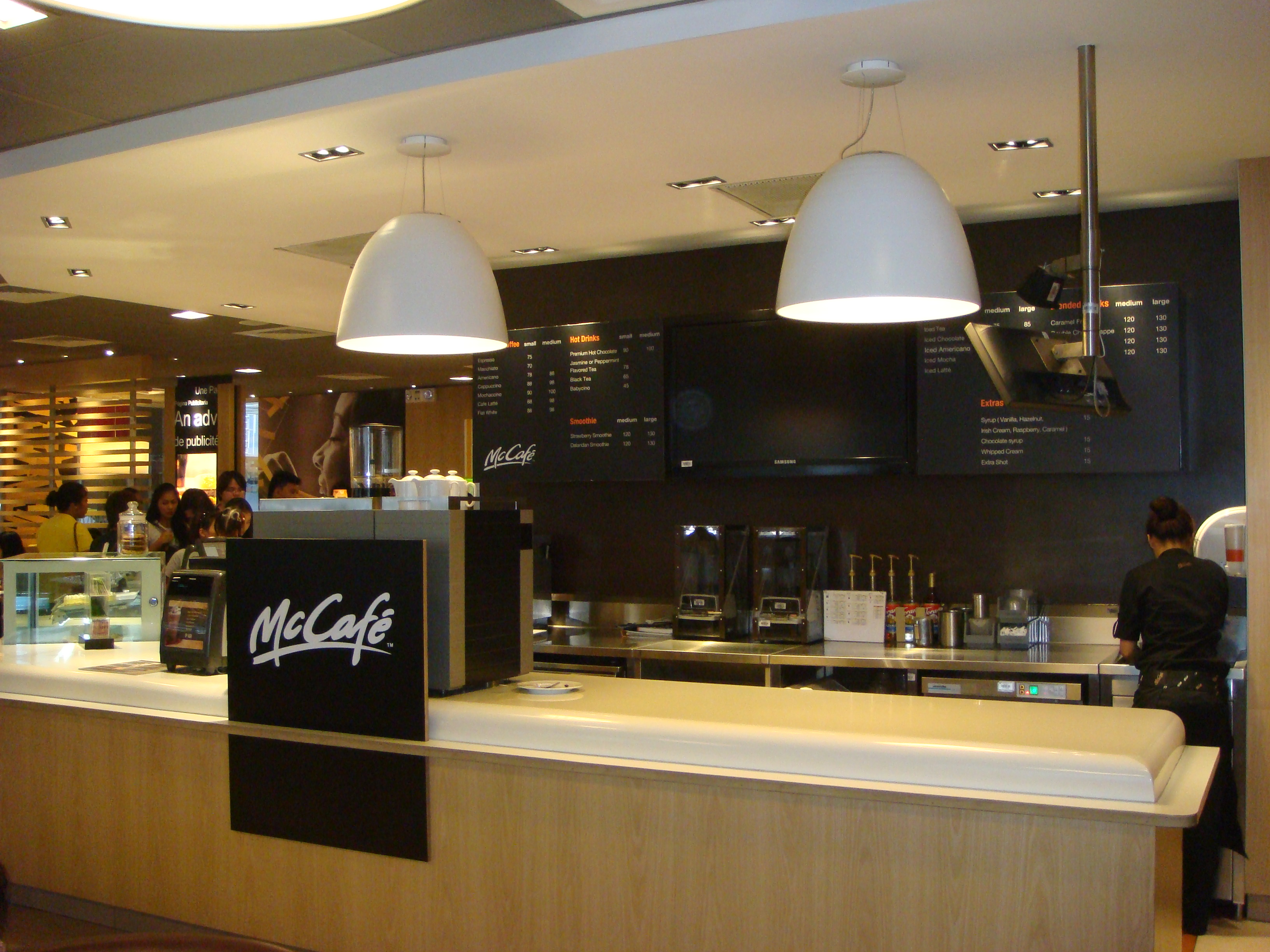
- A location in the Philippines
- Type: Subsidiary
- Industry: Restaurants
- Founded: Melbourne, Victoria, Australia in 1993
- Headquarters: Oak Brook, Illinois, United States
- Area served: Worldwide
- Key people: James A. Skinner (Chairman & CEO); Ann Brown
- Products: Coffee and Foods
- Parent: McDonald's
- Website: McDonald's McCafé

McCafé is a coffee shop-style food and beverage chain, owned by McDonald's. Conceptualised and launched in Melbourne, Australia in 1993 and introduced to the public with help from McDonald's CEO Charlie Bell and then-Chairman and future CEO James Skinner, the chain reflects a consumer trend towards espresso coffees.

Reports indicated that McCafé outlets generated 15% more revenue than a regular McDonald's and, by 2003, were the largest coffee shop brand in Australia and New Zealand. After McDonald's Australia experimented with automatic espresso-pronto machines in the last decade and it failed to catch-on, all Australian stores were subsequently renovated and converted to McCafé outlets.

== International expansion ==
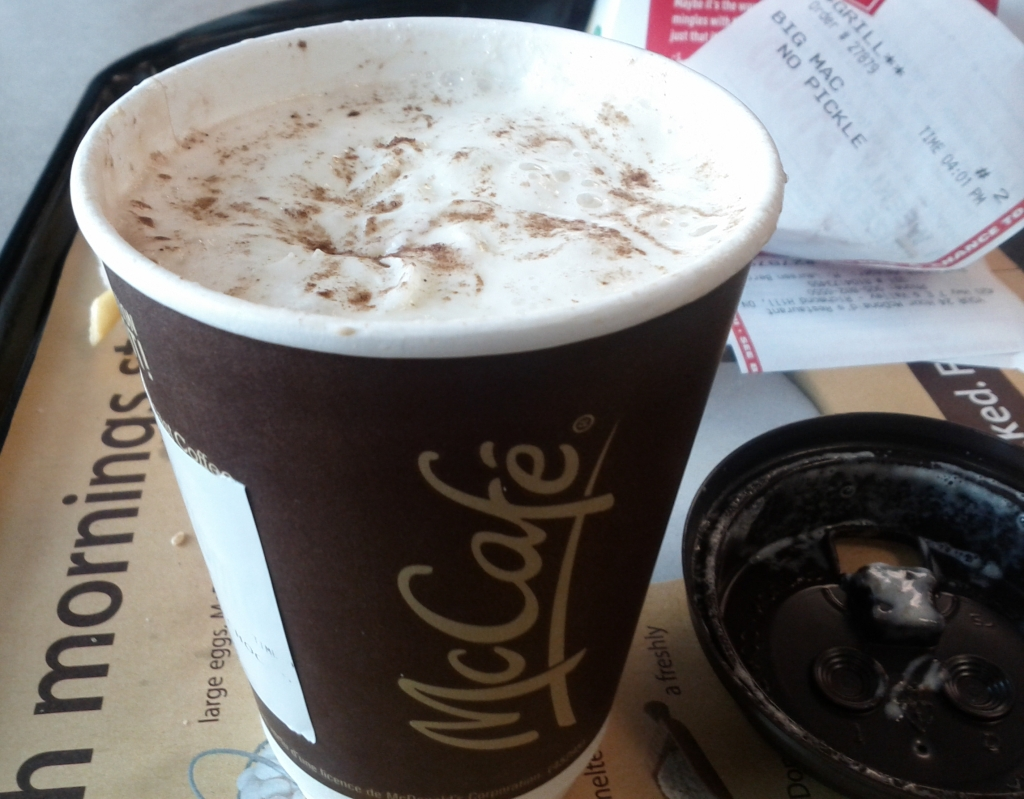
A cup of hot chocolate sold in Canada under the McCafé brand

The McCafé concept was designed to help create atmosphere and foot-traffic at the entrance to the McDonalds stores at Swanston Street, Melbourne (a very large store with the front counter a considerable distance from the shop's entrance). The idea was developed between Charlie Bell and the local Regional Corporate team (David Bayes, Mike Tregurtha and Jim Vasiliadis). The first McCafé opened as a Corporate store in Melbourne. The first one in the United States opened in Chicago, Illinois, in May 2001 when there were about 300 worldwide. In May of 2003 McCafé launched in the UK, then in 2004 McCafé opened in Costa Rica and in France, and the next year, the concept was launched in Italy. In 2007, the chain expanded to Japan as part of McDonald's efforts to boost sales with healthier soup and sandwich offerings and reach out to new customers who favoured traditional coffee shops. Despite being a relatively small part of McDonald's overall strategy, there are currently 1,300 worldwide.

In June 2006, the first McCafé in Bulgaria opened at the Mall of Sofia.

McCafé arrived in Paraguay in 2007.

In August 2008, McDonald's expanded their McCafé concept to South Africa, where the McDonald's franchise is already a household name and one of the largest fast-food chains in the country. At the end of 2009 McCafé drinks were available at McDonald's restaurants in the United States. McCafé opened in El Salvador on July 6, 2010, located in McDonald's restaurants in the Zona Rosa and Próceres Boulevard with the goal of providing the aroma, flavor and texture of 100% Salvadorian gourmet coffee.

McCafé opened in Madrid, Spain on June 28, 2008, located in McDonald's Montera restaurants.

In 2011, McDonald's started expansion of McCafé in Ukraine. There are 6 McCafés in Kyiv, 1 in Lviv, 1 in Odesa, 1 in Dnipro and 1 in Kharkiv as of January 2014.

In July 2010, the McCafé added real fruit smoothies to their drink list. In November 2010, mocha and hot chocolate were added to their drink list. In July 2011, Frozen Strawberry Lemonade and Mango Pineapple Smoothie were added to the U.S. menu.

On November 7, 2011, McDonald's Canada launched McCafé across the nation after being available only in select stores prior to this announcement. With the introduction of McCafé in Canada, participating McDonald's stores have added mocha, cappuccino, espresso, americano, latte, iced latte, iced mocha and hot chocolate to their menus. With McCafé, McDonald's is now in direct competition with Coffee Time, Country Style, Second Cup, Starbucks, Tim Hortons, and Timothy's in the Canadian coffee market.

On June 16, 2012, McDonald's launched the first McCafé Malaysia in Kota Damansara, with a few others subsequently opening in the Bandar Utama, Subang Jaya, Titiwangsa, and Taman Connaught outlets - all currently located in Klang Valley as well as in Greenlane, Birch House, IJM Promenade and Penang International Airport - all in Penang.

In Turkey, McCafé operates under the name "McD Café". The first coffee shop opened in July 2012 at Sabiha Gökçen Airport. As of April 2016, there are 8 McD Cafés on the Asian side of Istanbul, 6 on the European side, 3 in Antalya, 2 each in Adana and Kocaeli, and one each in Afyonkarahisar, Aksaray, Ankara and Kırşehir.

In December 2012, McDonald's announced that it would be bringing the McCafé brand and line of products to all of the McDonald's restaurants in the United Kingdom. This would include the addition of iced frappés, iced fruit smoothies and a rebranding of the standard McDonald's coffee to "McCafé."

On October 14, 2013, McDonald's launched the first McCafé India in the South Mumbai area in Mumbai, Maharashtra.

McDonald's introduced a coffee line called "McCafé" nationwide in the United States. In August 2014, the company announced it was going to start to selling its coffee for home brewing in supermarkets across the United States. Manufactured and distributed in partnership with Kraft Foods, the coffee is currently available in prepackaged bags and K-Cups.

In December 2015, McDonald's Canada opened its first standalone McCafé store in Toronto Union Station's newly built York concourse area.

Former McCafé logo used from 2019 to 2026

On March 20, 2018, the first McCafé in Minsk, Belarus was opened. Another McCafé opened its doors in Minsk on June 24, 2018, and one more was planned to open by the end of 2018.

In 2019, McCafé opened in different cities of Pakistan.

On May 1, 2026, as part of expansion of its beverage menus and in effort to strengthen its brand among Gen Z customers, McCafé unveiled a new logo and color palette. Designed by creative designer Turner Duckworth, with the new lettering developed in collaboration with type designer Alec Tear, The rebrand saw a modernized "McCafé" font using curves inspired by the same design language as the Golden Arches. Alongside this, McCafé introduced a new color system with a refined gold and “coffee cherry” as primary colors, and secondary colors that “reflect the vibrancy of the new drinks.”

== See also ==
- List of coffeehouse chains
