= Charlie Bell (businessman) =

Australian businessman

Charles Hamilton Bell AO
- Charlie Bell promoting McDonald's
- Born: 7 November 1960; Kingsford, Australia
- Died: 17 January 2005 (aged 44); Australia
- Education: Our Lady of the Rosary Primary School, Marcellin College Randwick
- Occupations: President and CEO, McDonald's
- Title: Order of Australia
- Spouse: Leonie
- Children: Alex
- Parents: Charlie (father); Margaret (mother)
- Website: The Charlie Bell Scholarship Program

Charles Hamilton Bell AO (7 November 1960 – 17 January 2005) was an Australian business executive. He was president of the American fast-food chain McDonald's from December 2002, and chief executive officer from April to November 2004. Bell was the first non-American and the youngest person to hold that position.

== Career ==
Bell grew up in Sydney, Australia, and attended Marcellin College Randwick. Bell began his career at McDonald's when he was 15 in 1976, working at the Kingsford restaurant in Sydney earning $3.55 an hour. Bell was on the bus home when he met a friend on the way to apply for a job at the restaurant. Bell went with him and got the job that his friend missed out on.

Peter Ritchie, the first managing director of McDonald's Australia said of him "He was ready to tell us how the place should have been run from 15 onwards". Bell was assistant manager at 18, and at 19, he became the youngest store manager in McDonald's Australia. At age 29 he was on the board of the Australian subsidiary as a marketing manager, becoming its managing director at 33.

He quickly rose through the ranks of corporate McDonald's. When Bell was asked if he would like to be CEO, Bell responded: "I take every job at McDonald's like it's going to be my last. If I die in this job, I will be very happy." Bell was appointed president and chief operating officer, when Jim Cantalupo (former McDonald's International CEO) returned to the company on 1 January 2003 as chairman and CEO of corporate McDonald's to lead a turnaround effort. Under Cantalupo's predecessor Jack M. Greenberg, the company suffered earnings declines in each of the last seven-quarters. Shareholders were initially not impressed with Cantalupo and Bell's appointments as it suggested that the company was "inbred".

However, Cantalupo "devised a plan" which included "accelerating the introduction of healthier foods, such as salads". Bell's implementation of this policy led to the company's recovery in the succeeding 12 months. When Cantalupo died suddenly on 19 April 2004, Bell was appointed CEO while retaining his title of president.

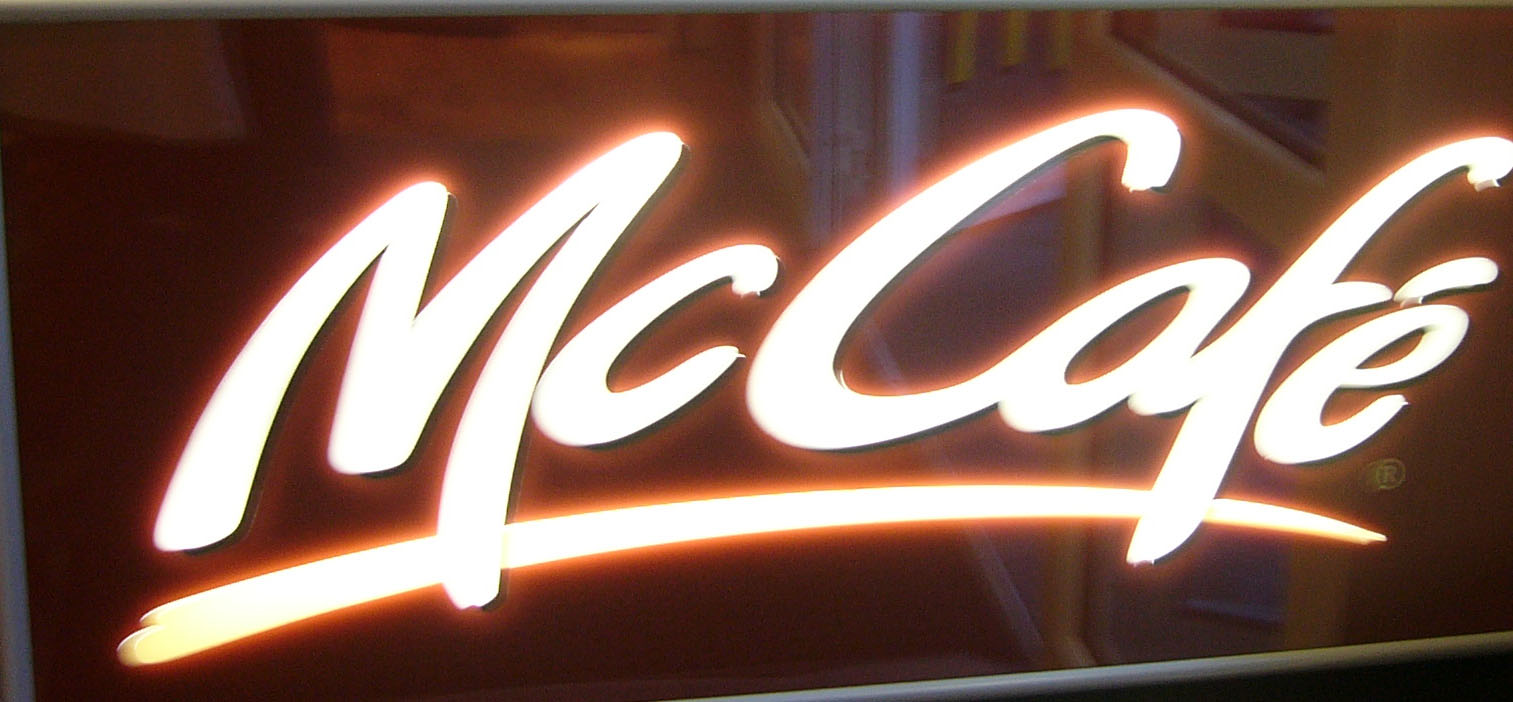
Bell introduced the McCafé to McDonald's.

During Bell's short time as CEO of the company, its greatest problem was criticism of the healthiness of its food, which was exacerbated by the release of the documentary film Super Size Me. Bell led efforts to add healthier choices to the McDonald's menu, and allow parents to substitute juice and apple slices for fries and soft drinks for their children. The "Supersize" option was also eliminated. During his brief tenure, his initiatives resulted in a successful turnaround in McDonald's fortunes, with the stock price rising 24%. Bell was also responsible for introducing the McCafé, a coffeehouse franchise that serves gourmet coffee, cakes and pastries and premium teas.

== Illness and death ==
Soon after becoming CEO, Bell was diagnosed with colon cancer. He had surgery on 7 May 2004, just over two weeks after taking over as CEO. He continued working for a time, but eventually resigned on 22 November 2004 to focus on the disease, which became incurable. Bell was succeeded by vice chairman Jim Skinner as CEO and by Michael Roberts as president.

In December 2004, McDonald's paid $300,000 for the terminally-ill Bell to be returned to Australia in a specially equipped jet. He died shortly afterwards at his apartment in Sydney with his family around him.

The deaths of Cantalupo and Bell, who died relatively young, have led some to wonder whether being an executive at a company which produced allegedly unhealthy food led to their illnesses, particularly as Bell was known to eat McDonald's products often. Similarly, two successive CEOs of Wendy's, Jim Near and Gordon Teter, died in their fifties of heart attacks. It is not known whether Bell's diet contributed to his cancer.

== Honours ==
Bell was made an Officer of the Order of Australia in June 2005. The award was made retrospective to 17 June 2004.

== Other appointments ==
Bell held the following appointments:

- Member of the Global Board of Ronald McDonald House Charities, serving until 2001.
- Member of the Business Council of Australia.
- Member of the advisory board of the Juvenile Diabetes Foundation from 1993 to 1999.
- Chairman of the Small Business Deregulation Task Force, appointed by John Howard (Prime Minister of Australia) in 1996.
- Trustee of the Sydney Theatre Company, between 1997 and 2000.
- Director of the Pact Youth Theatre in Sydney, Australia between 1988 and 1997.

Business positions
Preceded by Jim Cantalupo	CEO of McDonald's; 2004–2004	Succeeded by Jim Skinner
