= Michael R. Quinlan =

American businessman and philanthropist (1944–2025)

- Born: December 9, 1944; Chicago, Illinois, U.S.
- Died: September 22, 2025 (aged 80); Oak Brook, Illinois
- Education: Loyola University Chicago
- Occupations: Accountant, Business executive, President, Philanthropist, CEO McDonald's, 1987–1999
- Years active: 1966–2025
- Predecessor: Fred L. Turner

Michael Robert Quinlan (December 9, 1944 – September 22, 2025) was an American businessman and philanthropist who was CEO of McDonald's from 1987 to 1999.

== Life and career ==
Quinlan was born on December 9, 1944. He graduated from Fenwick High School in Oak Park, Illinois. He was a graduate, and chairman of the board of trustees, of Loyola University Chicago, where he was initiated into the Alpha Delta Gamma National Fraternity. Quinlan served as a director of McDonald's Corporation, from 1979 until his retirement in 2002. He was the chairman of the board of directors of McDonald's from March 1990 to May 1999 and chief executive officer from March 1987 through July 1998. Quinlan became President and COO in 1982. Quinlan started with McDonald's in 1963 in the mailroom and worked his way up to senior management. Quinlan got the job through his roommate John Martino, the son of June Martino, McDonald's secretary at the time.

Quinlan and his wife, Marilyn, donated approximately one-third of the $40 million raised to construct the new Life Sciences Building at Loyola, completed in 2004. The building was dedicated as the Michael R. and Marilyn C. Quinlan Life Sciences Education and Research Center on December 3, 2004.

On June 2, 2012, during Loyola's annual Founder's Dinner, it was announced that Quinlan was donating $40 million to Loyola's business school. The donation enabled the school to fund new programs, support more students, and expand its facilities. Loyola renamed its School of Business Administration and Graduate School of Business to the Michael R. Quinlan School of Business. The 820 north block of State Street (corner of N. State and E. Pearson St.), where the Quinlan School of Business is located, is designated Honorary Michael R. Quinlan Way.

Quinlan died on September 22, 2025, at the age of 80.

Business positions
Preceded by Fred L. Turner	CEO of McDonald's; 1987–1999	Succeeded by Jack M. Greenberg
