= Entry-level job =

Job requiring little or no prior work experience

An entry-level job is a job that is normally designed or designated for recent graduates of a given discipline and typically does not require prior experience in the field or profession. These roles may require some on-site training. Many entry-level jobs are part-time and do not include employee benefits. Recent graduates from high school or college usually take entry-level positions.

== At College ==
Entry-level jobs targeted at college graduates often offer a higher salary than those targeted at high school graduates. These positions are more likely to require specific skills, knowledge, or experience. Most entry-level jobs offered to college graduates are full-time permanent positions and some offer more extensive graduate training programs. While entry-level jobs traditionally required no experience, the Great Recession produced a surplus of college graduates on the job market and eliminated many entry-level positions.

== United States ==
In the United States, post-COVID-19 entry-level jobs increasingly require experience to qualify, though applicants struggle to get the requisite experience.

== See also ==
- Employment – Relationship between employee and employer
- Labor union – Organisation of workers with common goals
- McJob – Pejorative work-related slang
- Simultaneous recruiting of new graduates – Japanese hiring practice
- Working poor – Working people whose incomes fall below the poverty line
