= My Secret Life on the McJob =

Book by Jerry Newman

- Author: Jerry Newman
- Original title: My Secret Life on the McJob: Lessons from Behind the Counter Guaranteed to Supersize Any Management Style
- Language: English
- Publication place: United States
- ISBN: 0-07-147365-3

My Secret Life on the McJob: Lessons from Behind the Counter Guaranteed to Supersize Any Management Style is a 2007 book by Jerry Newman about low-wage work in fast-food outlets. Newman is a distinguished professor at University at Buffalo (N.Y.) School of Management who has taught business courses for nearly 30 years, and went undercover as a bottom-rung worker for the biggest names in fast food, including McDonald's and Burger King.

== Review ==
The book has had favorable reviews. The Wall Street Journal wrote:

Jerry Newman offers entertaining anecdotes and wonderful descriptions of the personalities working at every station of responsibility. ... Unusual for a business book offering management advice, My Secret Life on the McJob is written from the perspective of a crew member on the receiving end of the boss's expectations rather than from that of a manager who faces the challenges of building a team, running a business and earning a return on investment. ... It offers many lessons that would be helpful to managers in almost every segment of business—or even government.

—Andrew H. Card Jr., President Bush's chief of staff from January 2001 to April 2006; The Wall Street Journal, January 17, 2007.

== See also ==
- McJob
- Nickel and Dimed
