= Jack M. Greenberg =

American businessman and executive (born 1942)

- Born: September 28, 1942 (age 84); Chicago, Illinois, U.S.
- Education: DePaul University
- Occupations: Accountant, Lawyer, Business executive, President, CEO McDonald's, 1999–2002
- Years active: 1981–2002
- Spouse: Donna P. Greenberg
- Children: Ilyse Greenberg, Allison Orlinsky, David Greenberg

Jack M. Greenberg (born September 28, 1942, in Chicago, Illinois) was chairman and CEO of McDonald's Corporation from 1999 through 2002, when he was replaced by James R. Cantalupo. He was promoted to CEO in 1998, succeeding Michael R. Quinlan in that role as Quinlan retained the title of chairman.

A 21-year veteran of the company, Greenberg held the top spot during a tumultuous period, with the company suffering earnings declines in each of the last seven quarters of his tenure. As Greenberg explained, "We were going through a transition from what I call a founder's company to a modern, global enterprise. There is a cultural shift from what we were to where we want to end up."

A graduate of the DePaul University College of Commerce (renamed the Driehaus College of Business in 2012), Greenberg also earned a juris doctor degree from the DePaul University College of Law. He is a certified public accountant and a member of the American Institute of Certified Public Accountants, the Illinois CPA Society and the Chicago Bar Association, where he served as former chairman of the federal tax committee, and was president of the board of trustees of the Chicago Bar Foundation. Greenberg is a member of the DePaul University Board of Trustees. Greenberg is currently Non-Executive Chairman and Presiding Director of The Western Union Company.

He originated the "Made for You" production system, a cooking platform that facilitated a broader variety of menu offerings by allowing stores to precook meat patties and finish them to order. Previously the McDonald's chain had used a "build to stock" manufacturing process, precooking, dressing and wrapping most food prior to receiving customer orders. By postponing the finishing process (dressing and wrapping sandwiches), McDonald's could offer a wider variety of sandwich combinations without significantly increasing customer wait time.

== Awards ==
Jack M. Greenberg was inducted as a Laureate of The Lincoln Academy of Illinois and awarded the Order of Lincoln (the State's highest honor) by the Governor of Illinois in 2003 in the area of Business.

Business positions
Preceded by Michael R. Quinlan	CEO of McDonald's; 1999-2002	Succeeded by Jim Cantalupo
