= Jim Cantalupo =

American businessman

- Jim Cantalupo

President, CEO McDonald's'
- In office 2003–2004

Personal details
- Born: James Richard Cantalupo; November 14, 1943 Oak Park, Illinois, U.S.
- Died: April 19, 2004 (aged 60) Orlando, Florida, U.S.
- Cause of death: Heart attack
- Children: 2
- Education: University of Illinois at Urbana-Champaign
- Occupation: President, CEO McDonald's, 2003-2004

James Richard Cantalupo (November 14, 1943 – April 19, 2004) was an American businessman. He was chairman and chief executive officer of McDonald's Corporation from 1991 to 1999, and again from 2003 until his sudden death by heart attack at the age of 60.

== Life ==
Cantalupo was born in Oak Park, Illinois, the eldest child in a family of Irish and Italian descent. His father was an optometrist and mother a homemaker. Cantalupo earned a degree in accounting from the University of Illinois at Urbana-Champaign, where he was admitted to the Zeta Psi fraternity.

He married, and had a daughter and son.

== Career ==
He became a certified public accountant and worked for Arthur Young for eight years, where McDonald's was a client. He was offered the job of controller with a substantial salary increase with the then fast growing McDonald's before taking a month to decide, finally joining in 1974. In the same year he was promoted to vice president and senior vice president in 1981. He became president of McDonald's International in 1987 and its CEO in 1991. He lost the top job to Jack Greenberg in 1999. McDonald's announced his retirement plans in April 2001, but on December 1 Greenberg resigned and Cantalupo agreed to stay on for another year to help with the management transition.

Cantalupo succeeded as CEO and chairman on January 1, 2003. Shareholders were not impressed, thinking that his appointment indicated that the company was "inbred". However, credit was given to Cantalupo for the company's recovery in the succeeding 12 months: "he devised a plan" which included "accelerating the introduction of healthier foods, such as salads".

Cantalupo previously was on the board of directors of Sears, Roebuck and Company. He was attending a McDonald's convention in Orlando, Florida when he was stricken with a heart attack and later died. McDonald's Japan CEO Den Fujita died of heart failure two days later.

== Notes ==
Business positions
Preceded by Jack M. Greenberg	CEO of McDonald's; 2003–2004	Succeeded by Charlie Bell
