= Fred L. Turner =

American business executive (1933–2013)

- Born: Frederick Leo Turner; January 6, 1933; Des Moines, Iowa, U.S.
- Died: January 7, 2013 (aged 80); Glenview, Illinois, U.S.
- Education: Drake University, B.A. 1954
- Occupations: Business executive, and former Operations VP, then CEO, of McDonald's Corporation; philanthropist
- Years active: 1958–2004
- Known for: Co-establishing Hamburger University with McDonald's CEO Ray Kroc (1961)
- Successor: Michael R. Quinlan
- Spouse: Patricia Shurtleff (m. 1954; died 2000)
- Children: 3

Frederick Leo Turner (January 6, 1933 – January 7, 2013) was an American restaurant industry executive, chair and CEO of McDonald's. He is credited with helping to massively expand McDonald's, introducing new meals and setting service standards for the company and its employees.

== Early life ==
Turner grew up in Des Moines and Chicago, going to high school at Dowling Catholic High School, and graduated from Drake University in 1954.

After college, he served in the U.S. Army.

== Career ==
Turner began his career at McDonald's in 1956 as a grill operator and was quickly promoted. He was named Operations Vice President in 1958, when the firm had only 34 restaurants. In that role, he established strict guidelines for how McDonald's hamburgers and other products had to be served - including that fries "had to be precisely 0.28 inches thick", and that "exactly ten patties had to be formed from each pound of beef". "Quality, Service and Cleanliness" became his motto. He became Executive Vice President in 1967, then President and Chief Administrative Officer in 1968. He became CEO in 1973 and replaced Kroc as Chairman in 1977, later named Senior Chairman upon Kroc's death. Under Turner, McDonald's expanded its operations to 118 countries, with over 31,000 outlets, and more than a billion hamburgers were sold.

He retired in 1987, after which time he served as Honorary Chairman.

== Awards and memberships ==
Turner served as a director for Aon Corporation, Baxter International, and W. W. Grainger. He received the Horatio Alger Award in 1991. He was a member of the Bohemian Club and Sigma Phi Epsilon.

== Personal life ==
On June 22, 1954, soon after graduating from college, Turner married fellow Drake graduate Patricia Shurtleff. The couple had three daughters. Patricia died on October 9, 2000.

Fred Turner died on January 7, 2013, the day after his 80th birthday, due to complications from pneumonia.

== Pop culture ==
Fred Turner has a small reference to his position as a grill operator in the 2016 film The Founder, which portrays the creation of the McDonald's fast-food restaurant chain. At a later point in the plot in this same movie, Fred Turner has a much larger presence, during Ray Kroc's successful attempts to open up McDonald's restaurants in the Twin Cities area in Minnesota.

He is also amply portrayed in season 2, episode 12 "Game of Chicken" of The History Channel series The Food That Built America.

Business positions
Preceded by Ray Kroc	CEO of McDonald's; 1973–1987	Succeeded by Michael R. Quinlan
