= James A. Skinner =

American business executive (born 1944)

Jim Skinner
- Born: James Alan Skinner; 1944 (age 81–82); Moline, Illinois, U.S.
- Occupations: Chairman, Walgreens Boots Alliance; CEO, McDonald's Corporation (2005–2012)
- Predecessor: Charlie Bell
- Successor: Don Thompson

James Alan Skinner (born 1944) is an American business executive. He was the executive chairman of Walgreens Boots Alliance. He was the vice chairman and CEO of McDonald's Corporation.

== Early life ==
James Alan Skinner was born in Moline, Illinois, United States, the son of Leon Skinner, a bricklayer, who died in 2006, aged 84.

Skinner grew up in Davenport, Iowa and graduated from West High School there in 1962.

He served in the United States Navy from June 1962 to April 1971 where he achieved the rank of Fire Control Technician (Missile Guidance Systems) Petty Officer 1st Class (FTG1). He served on the USS Oriskany (CVA-34) and the USS Midway (CVA-41), including deployment to Vietnam during the Vietnam War.

== Career ==
=== McDonald's ===
Skinner began his career with McDonald's in 1971 as a restaurant manager trainee in Carpentersville, Illinois. He never graduated from college, attending Roosevelt University in Chicago, before dropping out after his sophomore year.

Prior to becoming CEO, Skinner was president and chief operating officer of the McDonald's Restaurant Group with corporate management responsibility for Asia, Middle East and Africa (AMEA), and Latin America. Prior to that, he was responsible for McDonald's Japan Limited, their second-largest market. Skinner held numerous positions in the U.S. Corporation, including director of field operations, market manager, regional vice president and U.S. senior vice president and Zone Manager.

Skinner was named CEO of McDonald's Corp in 2004 and refocused the company on customer strategies, business disciplines and close global alignment. Jim Skinner was succeeded as vice chairman and chief executive officer for McDonald's Corporation by Don Thompson on June 30, 2012. Vice Chairman was a position that he held before becoming CEO in November 2004.

His greatest accomplishment, the "Plan to Win" strategy, managed to flip the company by reversing its falling profits. This strategy focused on improving on locations that already existed instead of expanding and building more. They hoped to achieve “faster, friendlier service; tastier food; a more appealing ambiance; better value; and sharper marketing.” By shifting strategies, Skinner and his team were able to increase McDonald's total sales, increasing from $50.1 billion in 2004 to $70.1 billion in 2008.

Skinner retired as Vice Chairman and Chief Executive Officer on June 30, 2012 after 41 years with McDonald's. In 2012, he received total annual compensation of $27,741,408.

=== Other ===
As of 2014, Skinner is a member of the board of directors of:

- Hewlett-Packard (2013-)
- Illinois Tool Works (2005-)
- McDonald's (2004-)
- Walgreens Boots Alliance (2005-) (Chairman)

He has been a member of John McCain 2008, McCain-Palin Victory 2008, National Republican Congressional Committee, Romney for President, and Romney Victory Inc.

== Awards and recognition ==
In 2009, Skinner was named CEO of the Year by Chief Executive magazine. In 2014, he was the recipient of the Lone Sailor Award from the United States Navy Memorial.

== Personal life ==
Skinner met his wife in Chicago, and they married in 1969.

Business positions
Preceded by Charlie Bell	CEO of McDonald's; 2004–2012	Succeeded by Don Thompson
