= High-speed door =

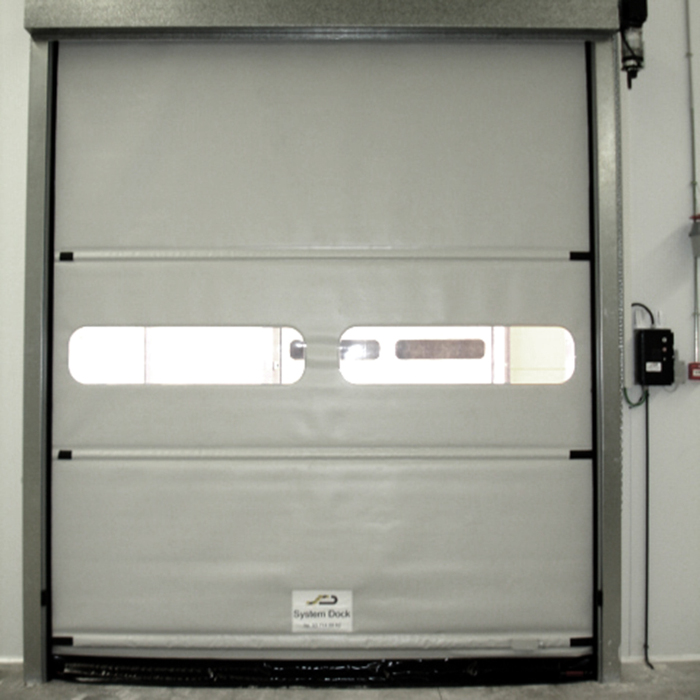
The speed doors are flexible and light doors for intensive industrial use.

High-speed doors are door systems, mainly used in industrial applications. They are technical enhancements of the generally known sectional doors, PVC fabric doors or roller shutters. The main difference is that the durable construction provides a higher operating speed, and they are able to sustain a higher number of cycles (opening and closing cycles) and require lower maintenance and repair cost. Depending on the intended field of application, horizontal or vertical operating door types are available.

In North America, the Door and Access Systems Manufacturing Association (DASMA) defines high-performance doors as non-residential, powered doors, characterized by rolling, folding, sliding or swinging action, that are either high-cycle (minimum 100 cycles/day) or high-speed (minimum 20 inches(508 mm)/second), and two out of three of the following: made-to-order for exact size and custom features, designed to be able to withstand equipment impact (break-away if accidentally hit by vehicle) or designed to sustain heavy usage with minimal maintenance.

In Europe & the UK high speed doors are generally doors which operate at over 500mm/second opening speed. Other common names include "Rapid Action Doors", "Fast Doors", "PVC Speed Doors" and "Speed Doors". The doors may be constructed from a variety of materials including PVC, aluminium, and steel insulated sections. Other popular variations include "Zipper Doors" which include a special zipper breakout system to prevent damage.

High Speed Doors are an evolution of the traditional roller shutter door (hence the alternative name they are often given of Rapid Roll Doors). They are primarily designed to give higher operating speeds, improved sealing and sustain a higher number of opening & closing cycles than traditional roller shutters, without compromising reliability & durability. To achieve this they generally have a strengthened drivetrain, strong but lightweight PVC curtain (usually with a vision window for visibility) and a high speed industrial motor. Usually they will roll up vertically to top of the doorway though there are specialist bi-parting horizontally opening variations available

== Application ==
High-speed doors are usually used wherever goods traffic occurs and where the doors have to fulfill special requirements. In the food and beverage industry, or Medical industry for example, special climatic conditions have to prevail; short opening and closing times reduce cooling loss, avoid airflow and enable a smooth operating procedure. They can also be designed in larger dimensions for the mining and aircraft industries.

Beverage industry: Intelligent airlock solutions can be achieved by means of high-speed doors. Two doors with highly transparent laths gives a clear view throughout. Pressure and temperature differences can easily be controlled by an airlock where the transporter enters the airlock, and the one door cannot be operated before the other has closed. This is also used in security applications.

Food, clean, and pharmaceutical processes: In the strict environmental constraints of pharmaceutical and aggressive environments of the food processes, where hygiene is imperative, doors must not only provide a structure made of stainless steel or composite materials to prevent corrosion, but they must also ensure an exposure time as short as possible to reduce the risk of airborne contamination.

Car manufacturing industry: The automotive industry is an industry where high-speed doors are well known. High volumes of cars are produced in short periods of time. High-speed doors are vital for the logistics processes, high speed and low maintenance ensures optimum production. Special high-speed folding doors are used on the dynamo tuning cells.

Profitability: High-speed doors may increase the efficiency of many companies. High opening speeds minimize the waiting time in front of the doors and thus accelerate the logistic processes, and control temperatures and pressure differences while saving energy, isolating clean areas from airborne contamination but still optimizing traffic flow.

Refrigeration: Refrigerators require an easy transfer between different zones of temperature and humidity. High-speed doors work in order to best ensure the most comprehensive maintenance of temperature in a refrigerator through the latest technologies available. The easy temperature transition from zone to zone is blocked by technologies designed for this sector. In this case is very important the flexibility and rapidity of high-speed doors.

Chemical Factory: Design requirements for explosion-proof electrical equipment are dispensed by ATEX legislation, which reports the levels of the electrical standard requirements complying conservative prescriptions. In places where men work with highly volatile and flammable products, the best advice is to rely on a manufacturer of rapid flexible doors, guaranteed and reliable. Pneumatic components react quickly in complete safety.

Supermarket Sector: Rapid doors for food businesses provide the minimum requirements of hygiene and protection of unauthorized personnel, as for example in a supermarket. Since it is quite likely that in the area next to the door we can find unauthorized and untrained customers.

Hangar Zone: With large openings where high-speed doors work in airports and naval ports it is required to provide an easy, quick and safe passage from inside to outside, and vice versa. Although the deposits of naval vessels are a very difficult environment to operate, places where the service of maintenance to ships or insurance protection from the sea can be requested at any time. With uptime 100%, airports can not break on time.

== Requirements ==
High strains, caused by the high operating speed (up to 4 m/s) and the frequency of openings, have to be taken into account during construction. In the same way, basic conditions like size and installation location add up to considerable requirements regarding safety and control technique.

A unique "roll-up" system generally defines a high-speed door from a conventional roller door. The door's main objective is to produce a high opening speed and the guiding system must allow smooth operations with minimal friction. Effortless movement will ensure the longevity of the door's moving parts and operating soundness. The latest versions of high quality high-speed doors use a spiral guiding system, thus keeping the door blade apart through a whole operating cycle, ensuring effortless movement of the door's roller devices in the guiding system and contributing to the excessive high speed. Excessive because these doors, by opening so fast and closing very slowly, are just trying to avoid getting their rigid closing edge caught by a forklift, at the expense of the insulation.

A counterbalance system generally forms part of the door's construction. This is designed with spring or weight mechanisms in the side frames, ensuring an emergency opening function and aiding to the opening speed.

== Regulation ==
In Europe, after a few incidents due to the excessive speed of the curtain and the stiffness of the embedded sensor, the European Community has implemented new regulations (EN 13241-1). Among the various normative constraints, the requirement against mechanical crushing during closure makes necessary to prevent contact with the door being closed or, in case of contact, to limit the vertical dynamic load below a strict curve. If the high-speed door does not meet one or more of these constraints, the closing speed will be limited to 0.5 m/s (1.64 ft/s). Only a few manufacturers offering a fully flexible and harmless sealing edge kept possibility of closing at a higher speed.
