= Pocket door =

Type of sliding door

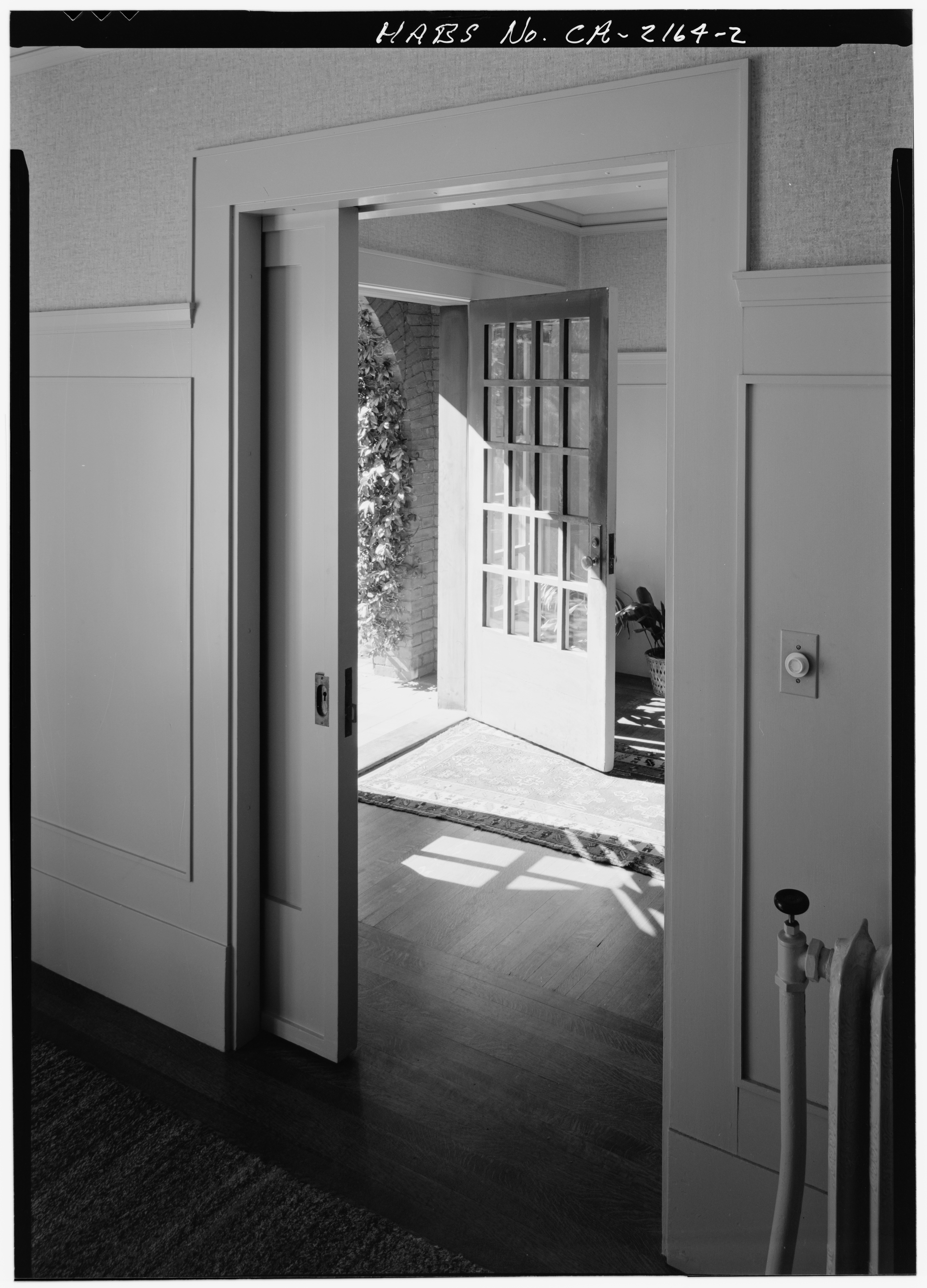
Pocket door between hall and dining room in a c. 1800s home

A pocket door is a sliding door that, when fully open, disappears into a compartment in the adjacent wall. Pocket doors are used for architectural effect, or when there is no room for the swing of a hinged door. They can travel on rollers suspended from an overhead track or tracks or guides along the floor. Single- and double-door versions are used, depending on how wide an entry is desired.

== Design ==
Installing a pocket door rather than a hinged door can free up an average of ten square feet (0.93 m^{2}) of floor space, according to building expert Tim Carter, who considers the pocket door "one of the top ten most overlooked items when many architects and builders plan a home". The doors were particularly common in Victorian homes to close off such areas as sitting rooms or dens; however, as architectural tastes changed, many of the hardware manufacturers went out of business. With improvement in the hardware and the growth of the market for condominiums and town homes, there has been a resurgence of interest in this space-saving feature. Modern residential uses include bathrooms, closets, laundry or utility rooms, or home offices.

A wall-hung variation is a sliding door, sometimes marketed as an "open pocket door"; this may be used where in-wall installation is impractical. This version is recommended for homes with disabled residents due to greater ease of opening.

One downside to pocket doors is hidden parts and hardware, which can make them difficult to replace or repair when something goes wrong. Fixing the problem might require removing the door and trim and opening up the wall.

== Use on rail vehicles ==
Pocket doors are rare on trams due to the amount of space they take up relative to the vehicle’s size, and on high-speed trains due to the lowered aerodynamics, but historically were the de facto standard for metros and commuter trains due to their simple design and ability to open quickly. They have however fallen out of favor for plug doors and external sliding in some regions, most notably Europe, China and to a lesser extent Oceania, but are still common in the Americas, South Korea, and Japan.

== Gallery ==
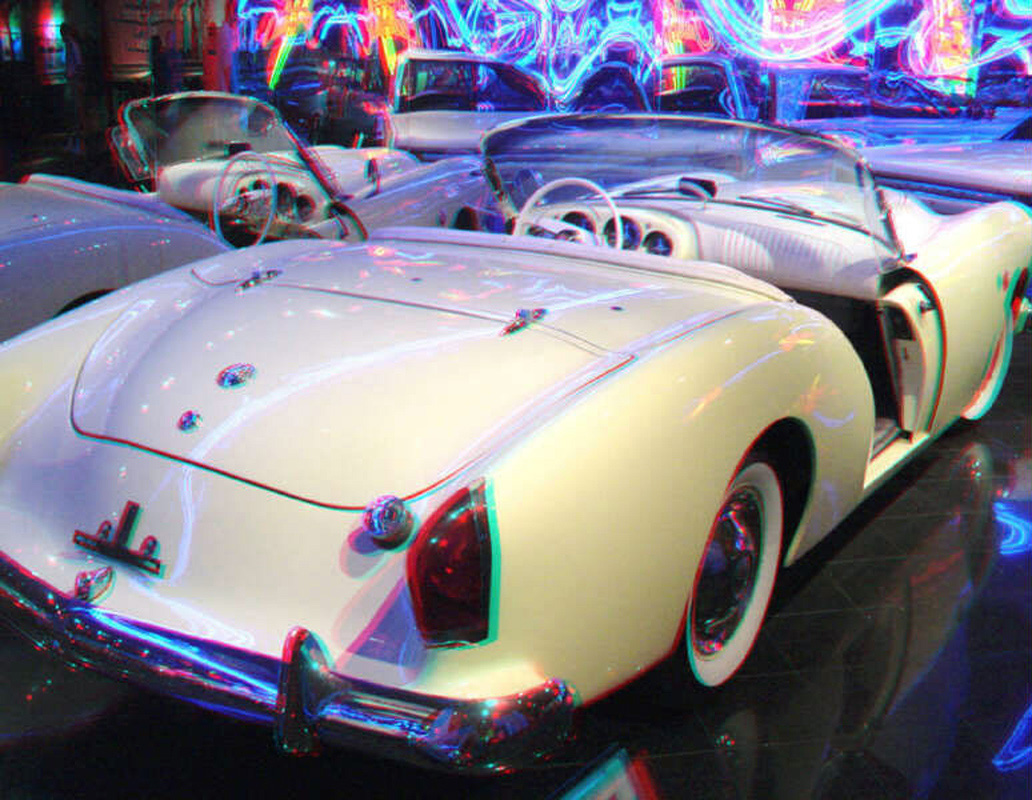
The 1953–54 Kaiser Motors Darrin sports car used pocket doors.

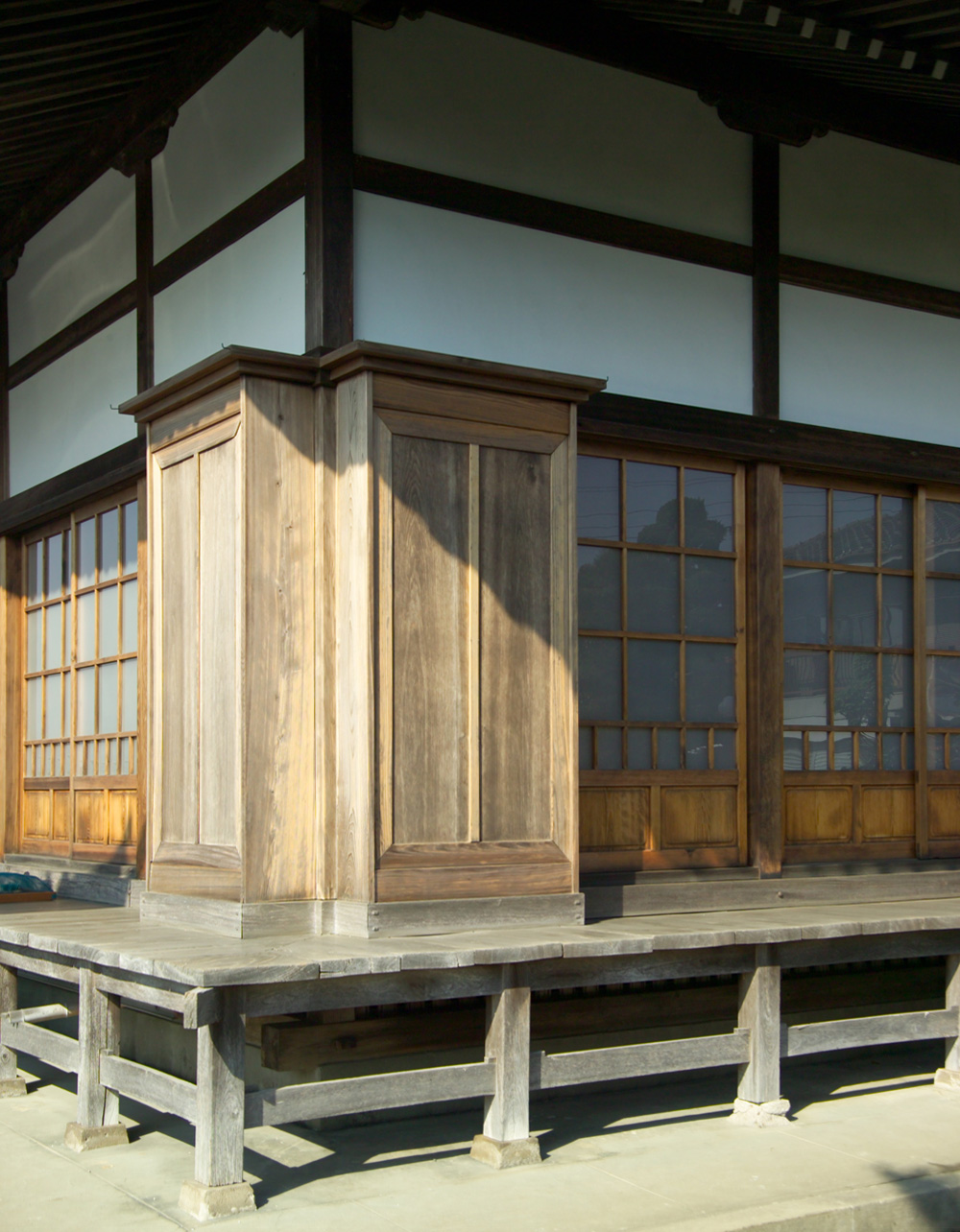
Sliding doors and the to-bukuro compartments into which they stack at a Zen Buddhist temple in Japan

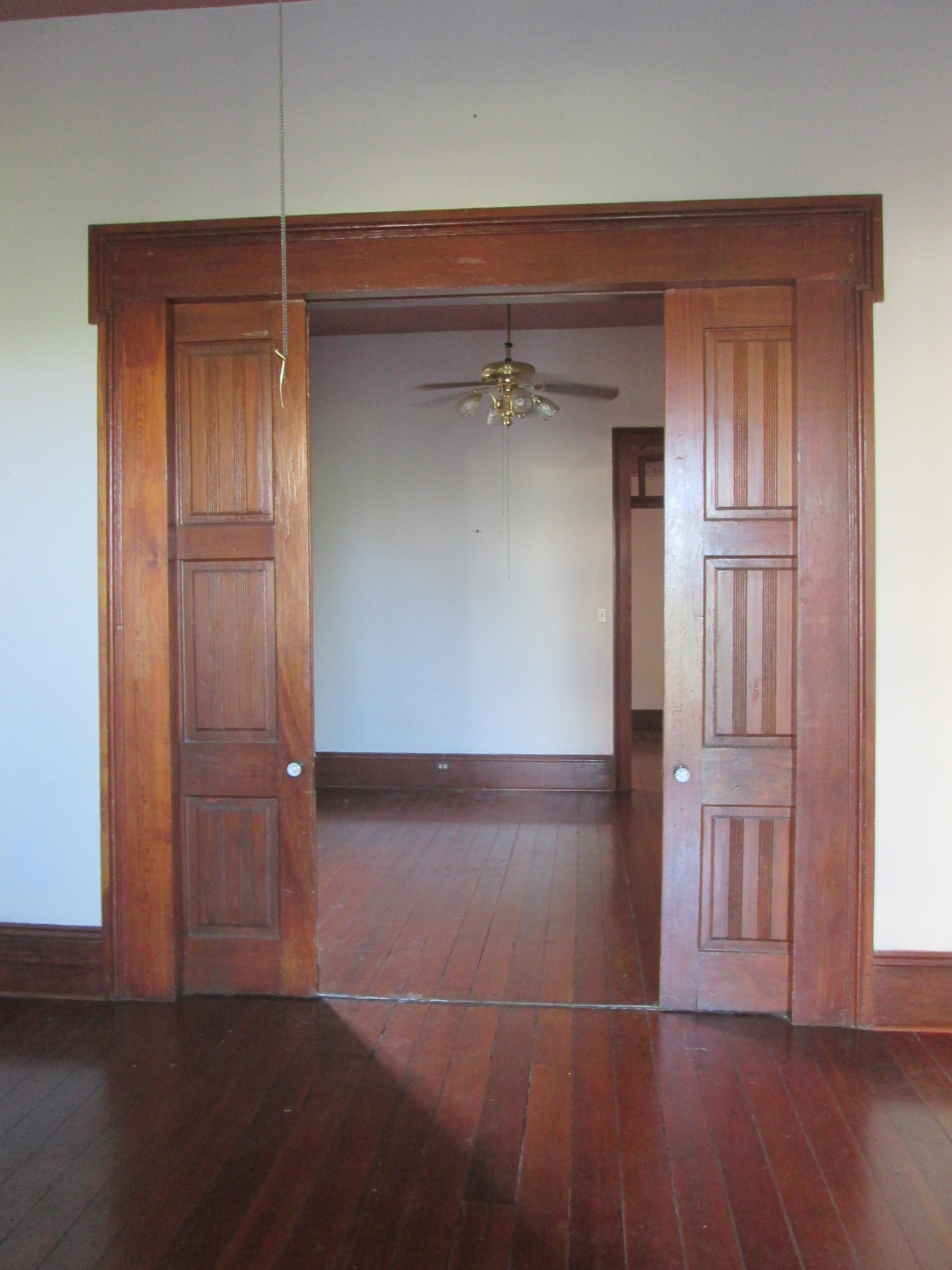
Pocket doors in the Emmett Hardy House, New Orleans

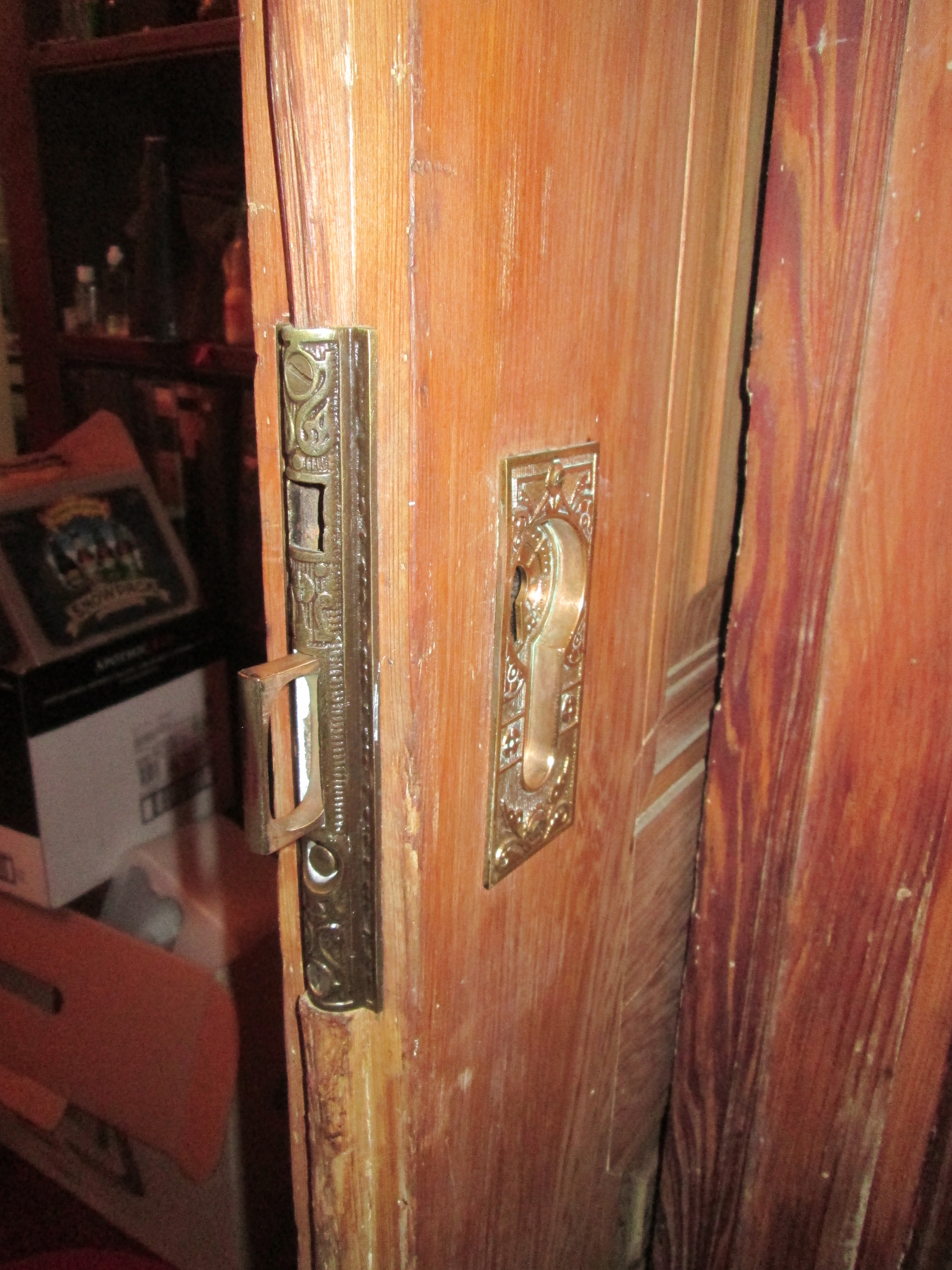
Mass-produced hardware for pocket doors, New Orleans

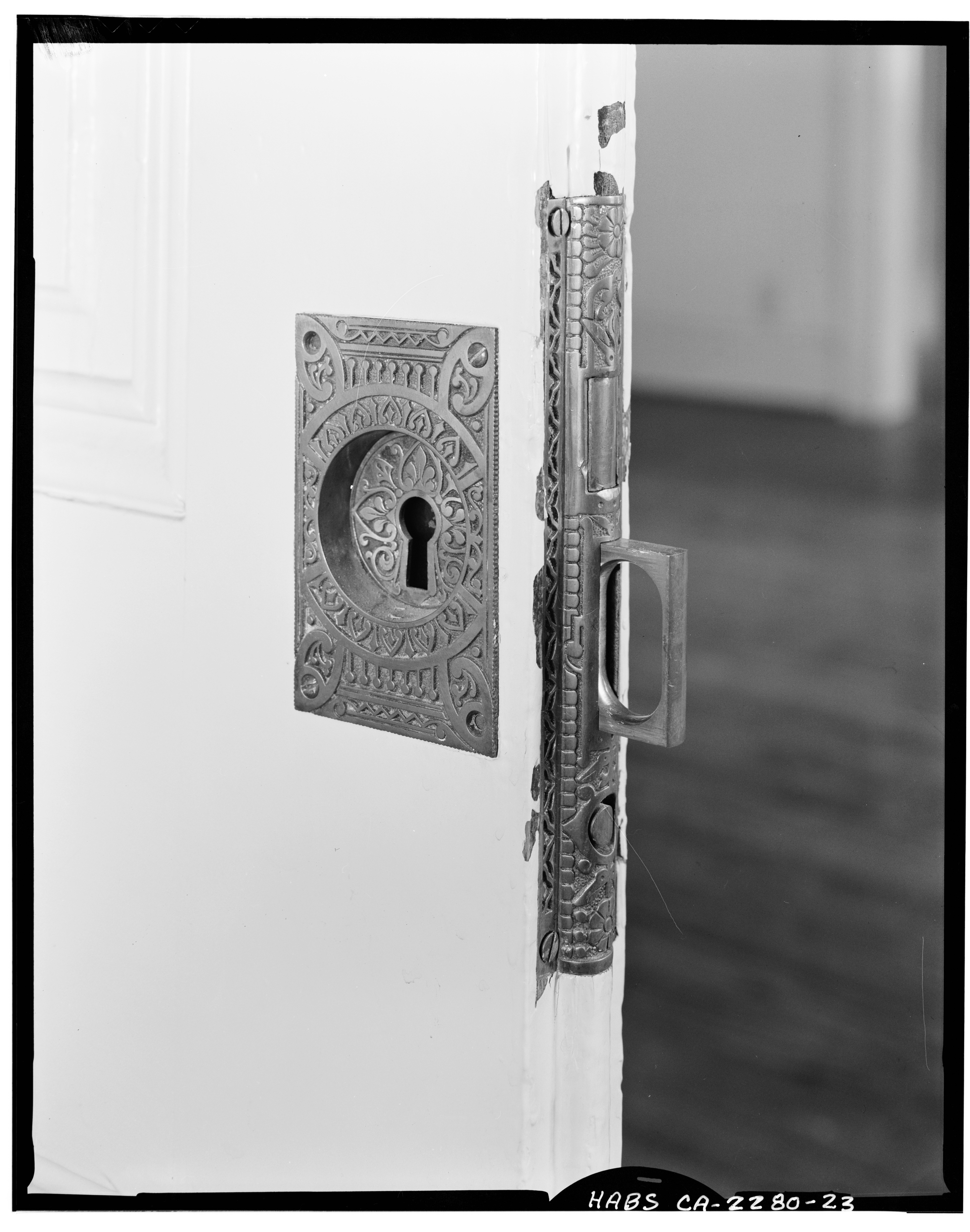
Similar mass-produced hardware for pocket doors, circa 1895, Saratoga, California

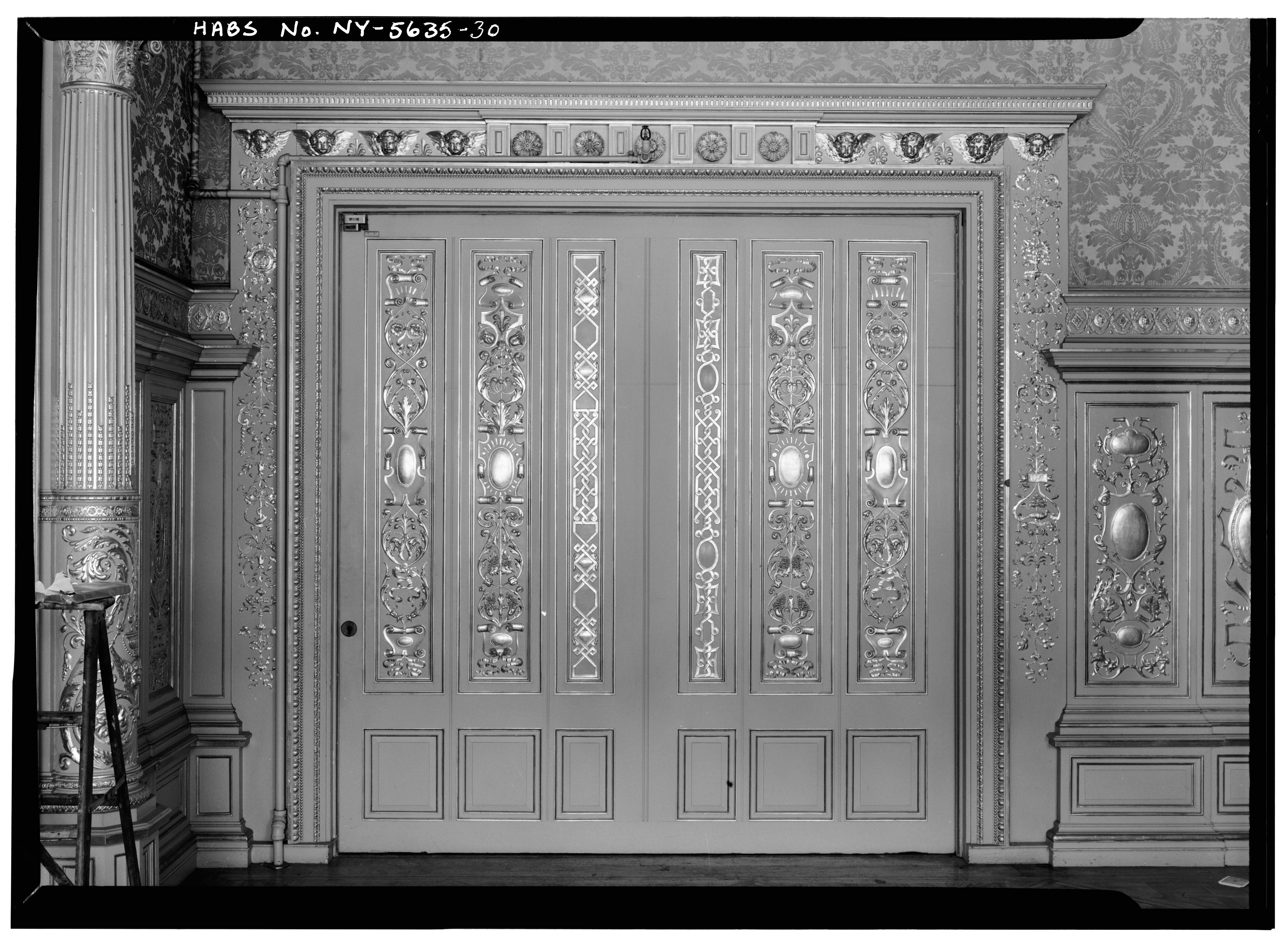
Pocket doors in the 1884 Villard Houses, New York
