= George Vanderveer =

American lawyer

George Francis Vanderveer (August 2, 1875 – October 22, 1942) was an American lawyer who defended Industrial Workers of the World (IWW) members during the union's years of "deepest trouble."

== Background ==
Vanderveer was born in 1875 in Iowa and died in 1942 in Seattle.

== Career ==
During and after World War I, Vanderveer became a champion of IWW laborers. Beyond cases (below), he even wrote Governor Ernest Lister of Washington state to stop the arrest of "Wobblies" because their imprisonment was a "grievous social and industrial wrong."

=== 1916 Everett massacre ===
In 1916, Vanderveer defended Wobblies accused in this strike and massacre.

=== 1918 Chicago Espionage Act trial ===
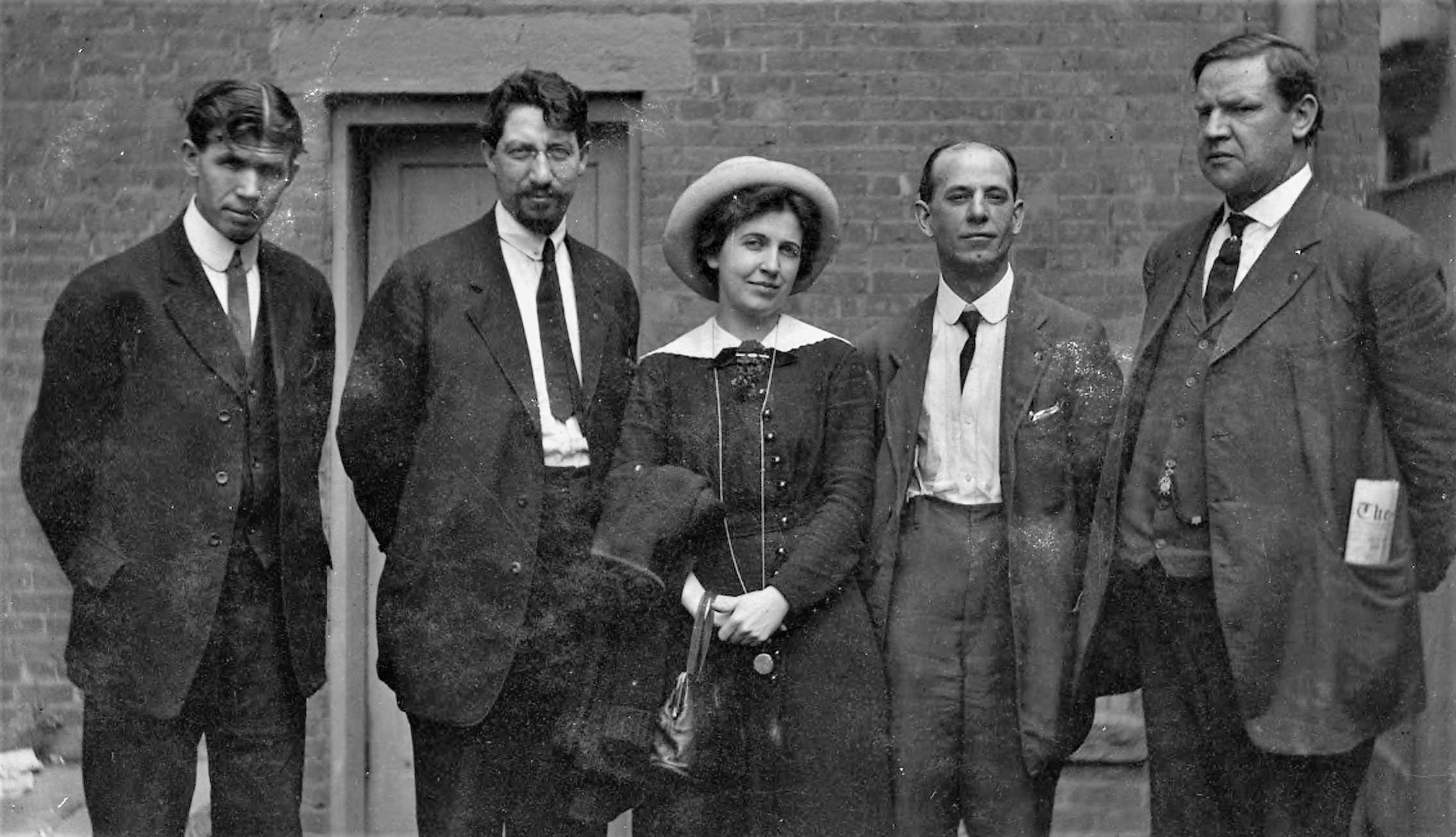
Bill Haywood with fellow Paterson silk strike leaders Patrick L. Quinlan, Carlo Tresca, Elizabeth Gurley Flynn, and Adolph Lessig (1913)

Vanderveer defended 101 IWW members, including IWW co-founder Bill Haywood, in a Chicago espionage trial in 1918 ("one of the largest criminal trials in American history").

During World War I the U.S. government moved strongly against the IWW. On September 5, 1917, U.S. Department of Justice agents made simultaneous raids on dozens of IWW meeting halls across the country. Minutes books, correspondence, mailing lists, and publications were seized, with the U.S. Department of Justice removing five tons of material from the IWW's General Office in Chicago alone. This seized material was scoured for possible violations of the Espionage Act of 1917 and other laws, with a view to future prosecution of the organization's leaders, organizers, and key activists. Based largely on documents seized on September 5, a Federal Grand Jury in Chicago indicted 166 IWW leaders for conspiring to hinder the draft, encourage desertion, and intimidate others in connection with labor disputes, under the new Espionage Act. 101 went on trial en masse before Judge Kenesaw Mountain Landis, which began on April 1, 1918. Vanderveer led their defense and argued that most evidence predated the war. They were all convicted — including those who had not been members of the union for years. The judge sentenced 35 to 5 years, 33 to 10 years, and 15 to 20 years; the remained 30 received clemency. (Sentenced to prison by Judge Landis and released on bail, Haywood fled to the Russian Soviet Federative Socialist Republic, where he remained until his death in 1928).

=== 1919 Seattle General Strike ===
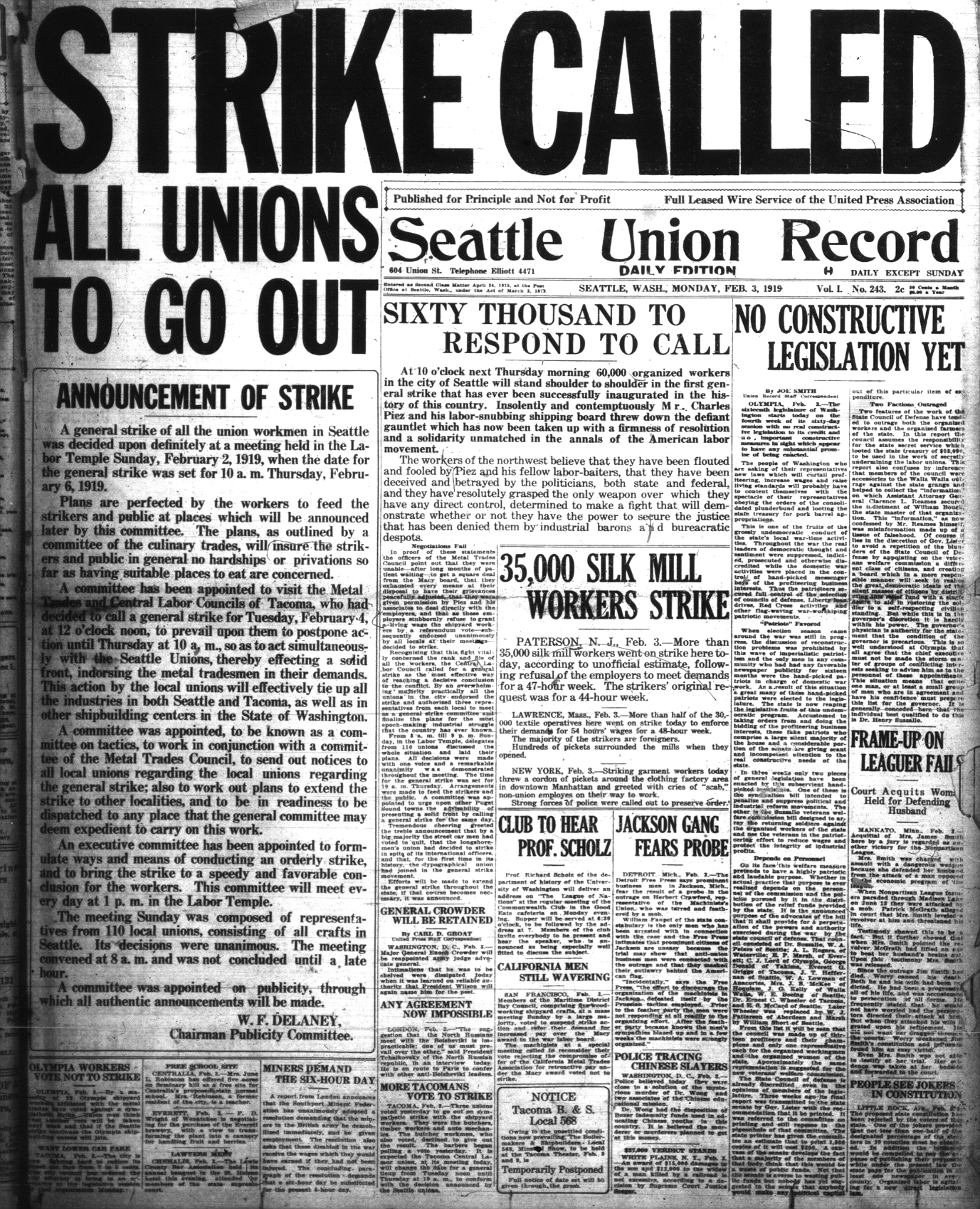
Seattle General Strike as headline ofUnion Record (February 3, 1919)

In 1919, Vanderveer defended AFL and IWW members in this five-day general work stoppage by more than 65,000 workers in Seattle, Washington, which lasted February 6–11.

=== 1919 Centralia massacre ===
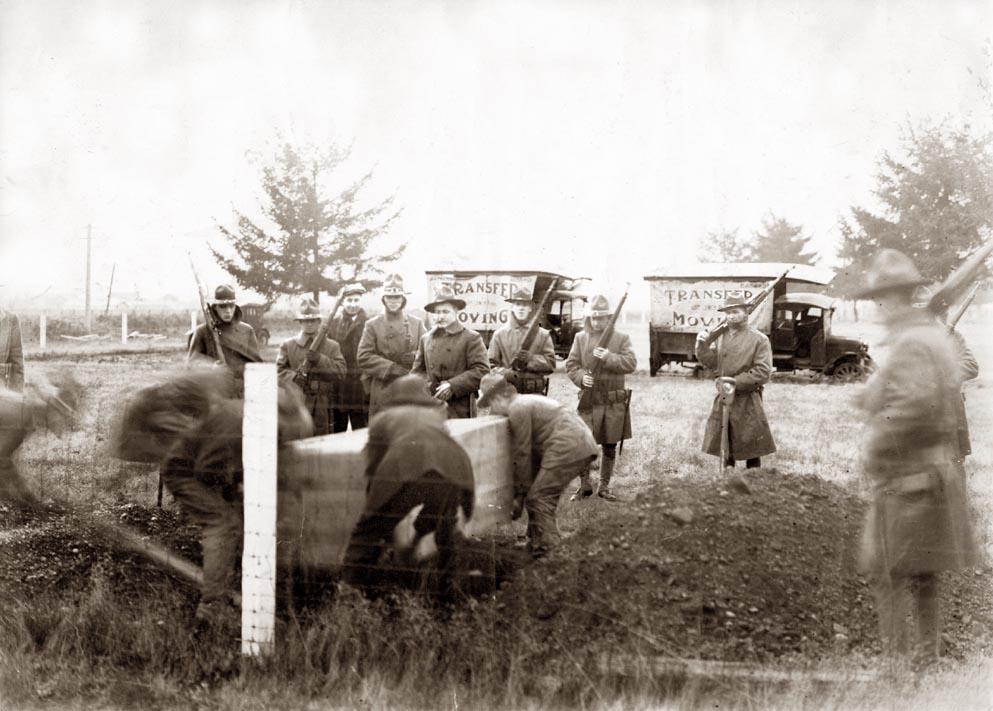
Wesley Everest burial in Centralia, Washington during the Centralia massacre (Washington) (1919)

In late 1919, Vanderveer returned from Chicago to Seattle, where he defended eleven men arrested and charged with the murder of Warren O. Grimm during the Centralia massacre, which landed local lawyer Elmer Smith in jail among others.

During the trial, Vanderveer is reputed to have said:

The IWWs say there must be a fundamental change and that fundamental change must be in the reorganization of industry, for public service, so that the purpose shall be that we will work to live and not merely live to work. Work for service rather than work for profit... This is a big case, counsel says, the biggest case that has ever been tried in this country, but the biggest thing about these big things is from beginning to end it has been a struggle on the one side for ideas and on the other side to suppress those ideas!

=== 1928 Seattle teachers v. Sharples ===
Vanderveer represented teachers in Seattle High School Teachers Chap. No. 200 of the American Federation of Teachers v. Sharples. When teachers formed a union (American Federation of Teachers, Local 200), the state school board imposed a "yellow dog" contract on them. AFT Local 200 fought the yellow dog rule in court; Vanderveer defended them.

== External sources ==
- Hawley, Lowell S.; Potts, Ralph Bushnell (1953). Counsel for the damned : a biography of George Francis Vanderveer. Philadelphia: J.B. Lippincott Co.
- Workers of the World Collection, Part 1, Papers, 1905–1972
- Phillip Taft Papers
