= Elmer Smith (activist) =

American lawyer and activist (1888–1932)

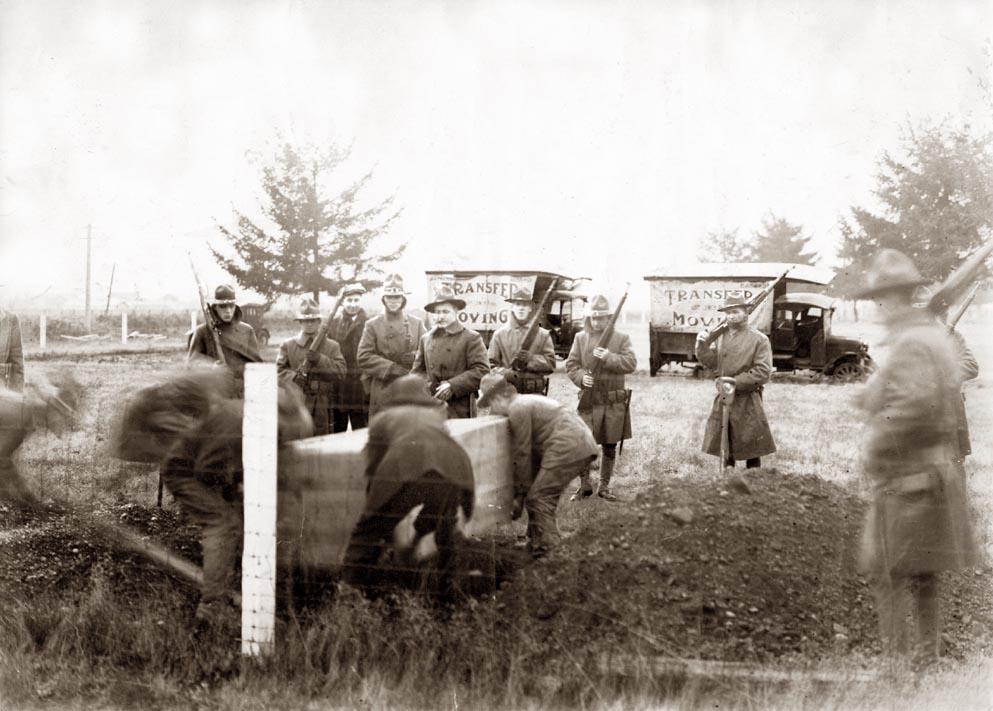
Wesley Everest burial in Centralia, Washington, during the Centralia massacre (Washington) (1919)

Elmer Smith (1888–1932) was an American lawyer and Industrial Workers of the World (IWW) union defender (known as Wobblies) who played a key role in the 1919 massacre in Centralia, Washington.

== 1919 Centralia massacre ==
See also Centralia massacre (Washington)

The IWW opened a local in Centralia, Washington, early in World War I. By 1918, they had clashed with the local American Legion after the burning of a first IWW union hall in 1938. The IWW re-opened in a second location.

Elmer Smith was a local lawyer, sympathetic to the IWW. A pacifist, he strongly encouraged union members to pursue a non-violent course and to try to reach a peaceful arrangement with the other residents of Centralia. He also reached out to the governor to attempt to get him to intervene to prevent a vigilante raid. The landlady for the hall and Britt Smith (no relation), the local IWW secretary, contacted law enforcement and asked for protection, but were told nothing was possible. The Wobblies then printed and widely distributed a flier calling on the people of Centralia to take action. None of these efforts yielded any response. With this being the case an extra-legal raid on the Wobbly hall seemed likely.

With attempts at a peaceful compromise unsuccessful, local IWW leader Britt Smith pressed Elmer Smith for additional advice. Elmer Smith agreed that it would be legal for the Wobblies to physically defend themselves, but, as he later testified, only in self-defense if attacked first. The IWW members interpreted this legal advice as justification to arm themselves for what they perceived as an inevitable and dangerous confrontation.

During Smith's trial the following year for his part in the Centralia Massacre, prosecutors would present this advice as proof that the IWW had planned the massacre. However, considering Elmer Smith's strong belief in non-violence and seeming good character, it is doubtful that armed conflict was his objective. The true intent of Smith's recommendation will probably never be known.

After the massacre (in which six people were killed), officials arrested Smith, although he had not participated in the massacre. Later, he was acquitted and released. He died before Governor Clarence D. Martin (1884–1955) commuted sentences.

== See also ==
- Centralia massacre (Washington)

== External sources ==
- Centralia Massacre Collection
