= Centralia Tragedy =

1919 violent incident in Washington, US

Coordinates: 46°43′14″N 122°57′41″W

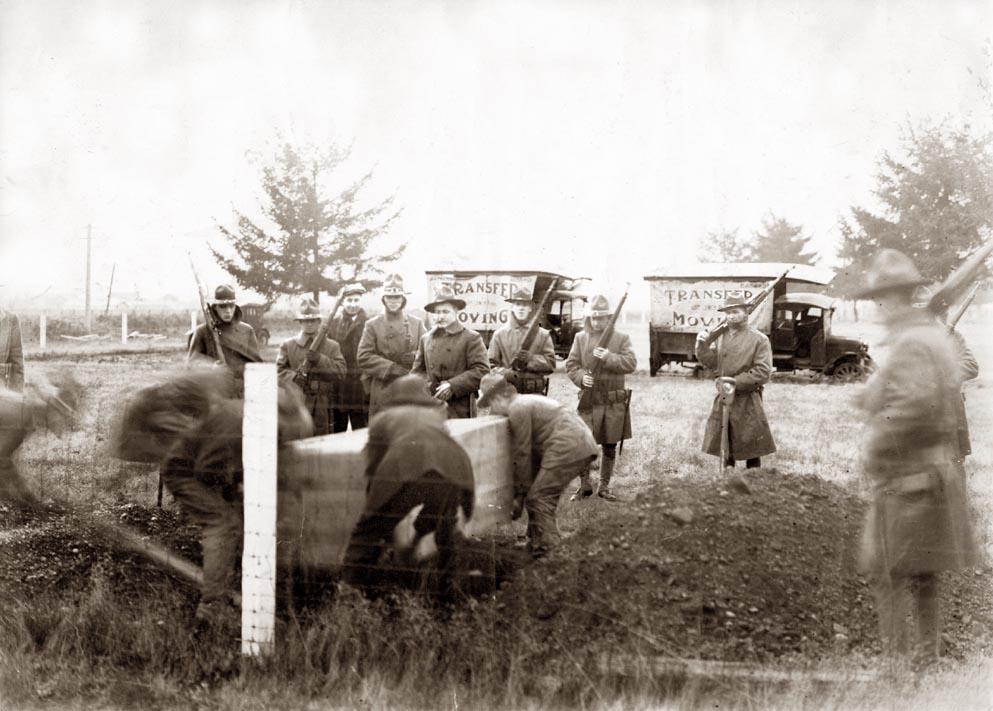
- The burial of Wesley Everest included an armed National Guard unit.
- Date: Armistice Day, November 11, 1919
- Location: Centralia, Washington

Parties
Industrial Workers of the World	American Legion; vigilantes; Centralia Sheriff's Department

Casualties and losses
Deaths: 1 Injuries: 1 Convictions: 7	Deaths: 5 Injuries: 3

- Wesley Everest Gravesite
- U.S. National Register of Historic Places
- Location: Sticklin–Greenwood Memorial Park, 1905 Johnson Rd.
- MPS: Centralia Armistice Day, 1919 MPS
- NRHP reference No.: 91001781
- Added to NRHP: December 17, 1991

- The Sentinel
- U.S. National Register of Historic Places
- Location: Washington Park
- MPS: Centralia Armistice Day, 1919 MPS
- NRHP reference No.: 91001782
- Added to NRHP: December 17, 1991

- Hubbard Bungalow
- U.S. National Register of Historic Places
- Location: 717 N. Washington Ave.
- MPS: Centralia Armistice Day, 1919 MPS
- NRHP reference No.: 05000922
- Added to NRHP: August 24, 2005

The Centralia Tragedy, also known as the Centralia Conspiracy and the Armistice Day Riot, was a violent and bloody incident that occurred in Centralia, Washington, on November 11, 1919, during a parade celebrating the first anniversary of Armistice Day. The conflict between the American Legion and Industrial Workers of the World (IWW or "Wobblies") members resulted in six deaths, others being wounded, multiple prison terms, and an ongoing and especially bitter dispute over the motivations and events that precipitated the event. Both Centralia and the neighboring town of Chehalis had a large number of World War I veterans, with robust chapters of the Legion and many IWW members, some of whom were also war veterans.

The ramifications of the event included a trial that attracted national media attention, notoriety that contributed to the First Red Scare in 1919 to 1920, the creation of a powerful martyr for the IWW, a monument to one side of the battle, a mural for the other side, and a formal tribute to the fallen Legionnaires by US President Warren G. Harding.

== Background ==
=== Prior conflicts ===
==== Washington State ====
Throughout late 1800s, Washington IWW organizing efforts illuminated the friction between the vision the initial settlers had for the Northwest and the evolving needs of the denizens of the urban and industrial centers. In late 1908, Wobblies protested Spokane agencies that fraudulently recruited workers for jobs that did not exist. In response, the city passed an ordinance banning street meetings and public rallies. When that ordinance was amended to allow specifically the Salvation Army to speak and hold meetings in public, the Wobblies took to the streets to defend their right to free speech. Within a month, 500 protesters had been arrested including 19-year-old Elizabeth Gurley Flynn. The fight ended with the ordinance revoked, with both sides declaring victory.

Hoping to come to the assistance of striking shingle weavers in Everett with another free speech demonstration, Wobblies traveled north to sustain the strike. The shingle weavers were striking to restore their wages as the price of cedar had recovered. City officials and mill owners wanted to prevent the IWW from landing and further radicalizing the conflict and deployed local police to hold off any external influences. After a series of beatings, two boats full of Wobblies traveled up the Puget Sound from Seattle and were met at the dock by the county sheriff. A shootout ensued, and both sides of the conflict saw casualties. The Everett Massacre and the harsh treatment the Wobblies received foreshadowed the events of the latter half of the decade.

==== Centralia, Washington ====
Locally, Wobblies were active in the union from at least 1914. Although open conflict was avoided, tensions simmered on both sides. 1914–1918 saw scattered strikes in the mining and mill industries. IWW efforts to open a hall for local members were met by opponents of the IWW who lived in Centralia.

The IWW succeeded in opening a union hall in the Spring of 1918. Relations with non-union members, particularly with the veterans who would eventually form the local chapter of the new American Legion, continued to deteriorate. The Bolsheviks had come to power in Russia and many feared that the IWWs intentions were similar, due in part to constant inflammatory allegations of ties between the two. Union members were being arrested across the country on federal sedition charges. IWW members were often targeted by vigilante violence around the region. To the business owners of Centralia, and the American Legion members in particular, the political leanings of the Wobblies were believed to be un-American and possibly treasonous.

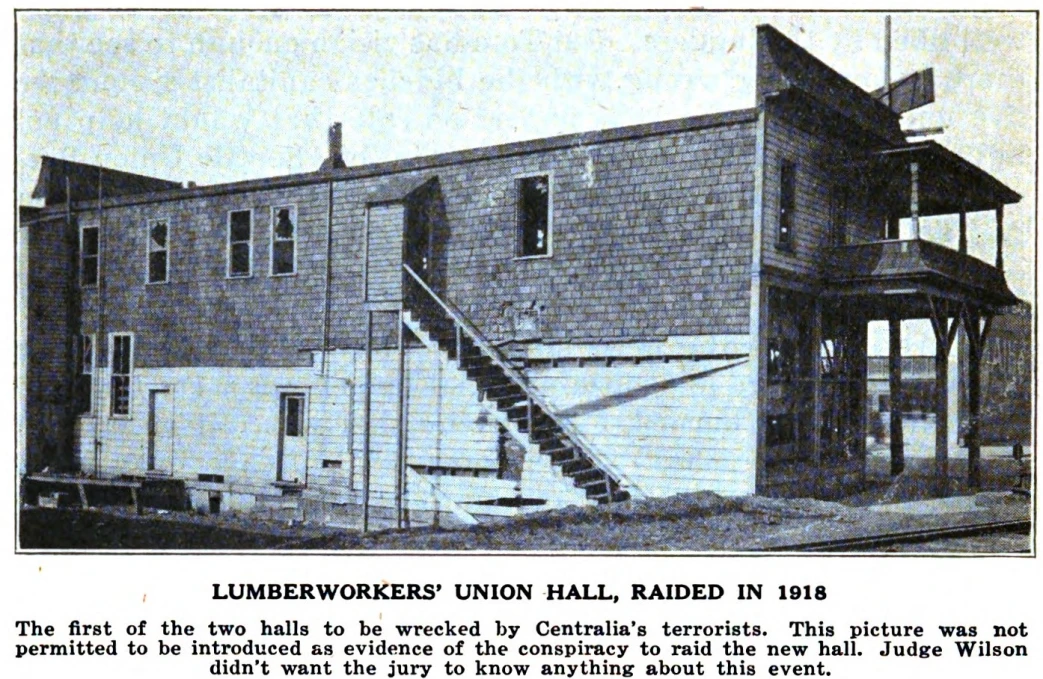
IWW Union Hall Centralia Washington

On April 30, 1918, the union hall was looted during a Red Cross parade. The building was severely damaged and a number of Wobblies were dumped on the outskirts of town and warned against returning. Members were thrown out into the street and beaten by both Centralia business owners and their, allegedly, hired muscle. After this incident, the union hall reopened in the old Roderick Hotel. The Wobblies vowed they would not be evicted again.

=== Contributory conditions ===
Elmer Smith was a Centralia lawyer sympathetic to the IWW. A pacifist, Smith strongly encouraged union members to pursue a non-violent course and to try to reach a peaceful arrangement with the other residents of Centralia. He also reached out to the governor to attempt to get him to intervene to prevent a vigilante raid. The landlady for the hall and Britt Smith, the local secretary, contacted law enforcement and asked for protection, but were told nothing was possible. The Wobblies then printed and widely distributed a flier calling on the people of Centralia to take action. None of these efforts yielded any response. Under these circumstances an extra-legal raid on the Wobbly hall seemed likely.

With attempts at a peaceful compromise unsuccessful, local IWW Secretary Britt Smith pressed Elmer Smith for additional advice. Elmer Smith agreed that it would be legal for the Wobblies to physically defend themselves, but, as he later testified, only in self-defense if attacked first. The IWW members interpreted this legal advice as justification to arm themselves for what they perceived as an inevitable and dangerous confrontation.

During Smith's trial the following year for his part in the Centralia Massacre, prosecutors would present this advice as proof that the IWW had planned the massacre.

Legion Post Commander Warren Grimm, who would become the first casualty of the massacre, was a local lawyer who interacted regularly with Smith. Despite vastly different viewpoints, evidence from personal logs indicates that the professional dealings between these two men were generally respectful and they had an appreciation for each other's legal acumen.

Grimm was one of the leading figures in Centralia. A local high-school football star and an All-American at the University of Washington, he had served with distinction as a U.S. Army officer with the American Expeditionary Force Siberia protecting the Trans-Siberian Railway during the Russian Revolution. To this day, the American Legion believes that Grimm was specifically singled out in advance as a target, especially since he had made a public speech about the "evils of the Bolsheviks" based on his experiences in Siberia, and was known to be strongly anti-IWW. The post-massacre Labor Jury of union leaders paints him as a lead participant in a "Centralia Conspiracy" who subverted his own men into attacking the Roderick Hotel. Wobbly-sympathetic author John Dos Passos ironically described Grimm as a "young man of good family and manners" in 1919, the second book of the U.S.A. trilogy, published in 1932.

Warren's brother and law partner, Huber "Polly" Grimm, was Centralia's city attorney at the time. Regardless of his personal feelings toward the Wobblies, Huber is on record during the town hall meeting of October 20, 1919, asserting that the IWW had legal rights and there was no law that could be used to force them to leave town.

To celebrate Armistice Day, the town leaders of Centralia planned a combined parade with the neighboring city of Chehalis, to be followed by festivities. The full contingent of both Centralia and Chehalis American Legion Posts, along with other civic organizations, were to march in the parade. This helped create a parade body that was overly crowded and unwieldy.

To make matters worse, the route was entirely inadequate, with the parade doubling back on itself at Third Street, a short way from the IWW Hall on North Tower. In addition, the route was modified only weeks before the festivities. According to event planners, this new route was meant to accommodate the larger-than-usual parade. In consequence, the parade was beset by a high number of starts and stops, tight crowding, and large gaps. More menacing, for the first time, part of the changes would result in the parade passing directly in front of the new Wobbly hall.

There were persistent rumors circulating among union members that the lumber companies and local business leaders were ready for a repeat of the 1918 incident and would use the Armistice Day parade as cover. The changes to the parade route, along with various inflammatory speeches by Centralia leaders, helped to fuel these fears.

Regardless of the truth of these rumors, they began to take on a life of their own. They became so prevalent that the owner of the Roderick Hotel, who was renting the facility to the IWW, asked the local sheriff for assistance during the march. The sheriff declined to provide protection. According to the Centralia Sheriff's Department, it was unable to commit already scarce resources simply on the basis of a rumor. In contrast, the Wobblies viewed this unwillingness as additional proof of what they believed to be the developing conspiracy against them.

Some members of the Legion marched with rubber hoses and gas pipes. The postmaster and a local minister were seen carrying nooses.

According to the IWW, their union members, fearing attack, decided to place men armed with pistols within their hall. To help prevent a repeat of the 1918 street beatings, additional Wobblies were staked out across the street in the Avalon and Arnold hotels. Members were also stationed on nearby Seminary Hill, with a commanding view of the street in front of the Roderick.

According to other people living in Centralia, the IWW, being on the losing end of the previous confrontations, was looking for a fight and wanted to even the score with bloodshed. As proof, they point out that only seven Wobblies were actually inside the hall. The rest, allegedly armed with high-powered rifles and stationed in those other buildings and on Seminary Hill, served not as lookouts but as ambushers. Since they could not influence any confrontation within the hall, these residents believed, the Wobblies' goal was to create a killing field in the middle of North Tower Street.

However, there was no general agreement among the IWW on how to defend their hall. Some Wobblies did not know that others were armed and not all were armed. Some did not know that other Wobblies were watching the parade from locations outside the hall.

Both sides have cited witnesses, claimed witness intimidation and false testimony by the other, and have used forensic evidence to support their arguments.

== Armistice Day ==
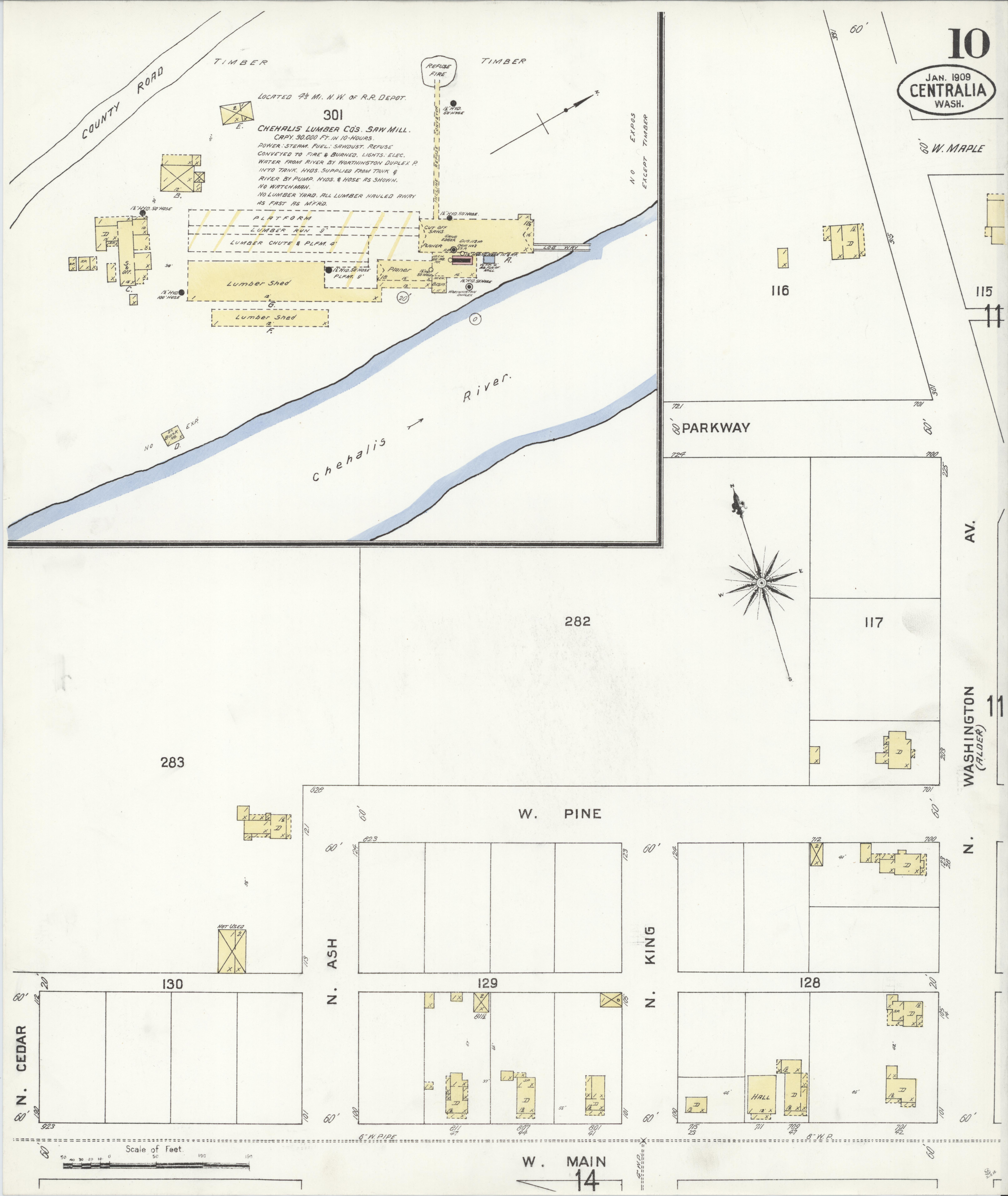
1909 Fire Insurance Map showing N.Washington Avenue at the right

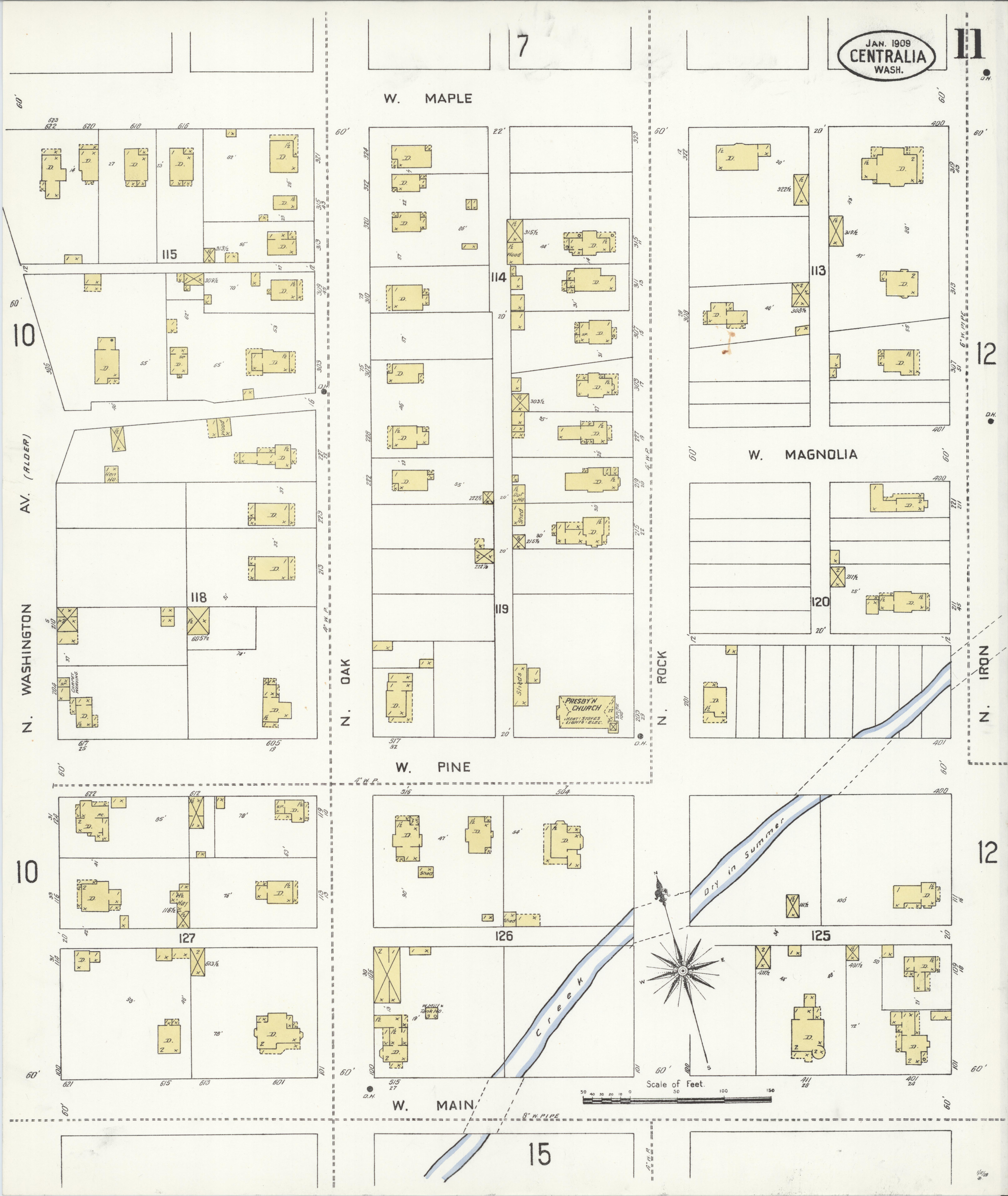
1909 Fire Insurance Map showing N.Washington Avenue at the left

Armistice Day, on November 11, 1919, was a celebration marking the end of World War I and commemorating the millions of victims. The memorial parade kicked off with the usual fanfare as local civic organizations and war veterans marched in full regalia. As the parade unevenly wound its way through Centralia, the Chehalis contingent of the American Legion passed in front of the IWW Union Hall.

Both sides agree that the Centralia contingent, which was beginning to press up on the Chehalis contingent, paused just before reaching the site of the hall. As the gap began to open back up with the Chehalis group, Warren Grimm turned to address his troops and uttered the command "Halt. Close up." Then, the front ranks began to mark time.

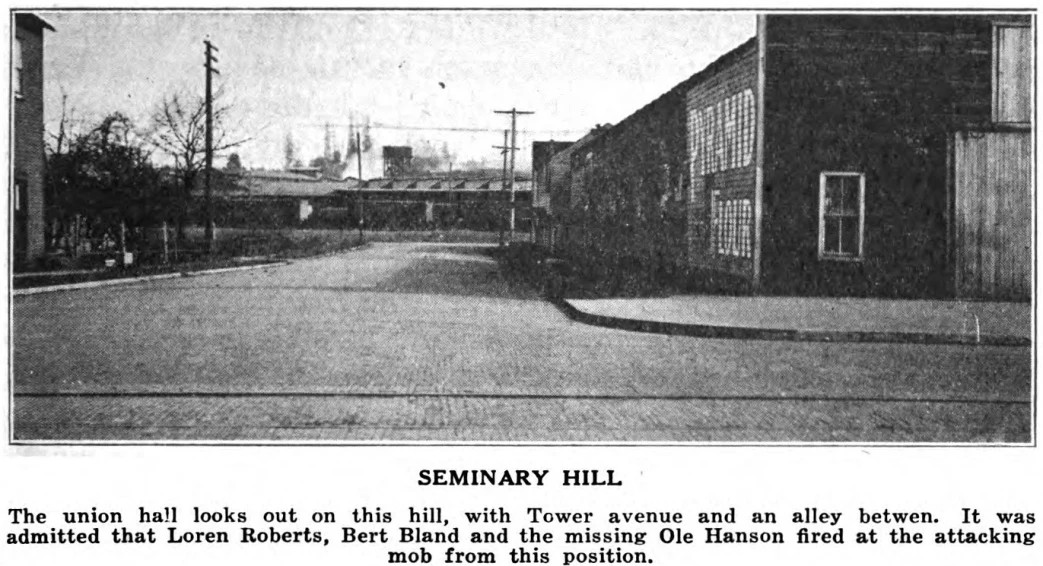
Seminary Hill Centralia Washington

According to the American Legion, the realigning of ranks presented Wobbly member Eugene Barnett, stationed in the Avalon, a direct shot at Grimm. The bullet from Barnett's rifle caught Grimm in the chest and passed through his body. The legionnaire McElfresh, standing nearby, was next. Hit in the brain by a .22 caliber bullet allegedly fired from Seminary Hill over 500 yards away, he was killed instantly. As the mortally-wounded Grimm was dragged to the sidewalk, additional shots rained down on the unarmed Legionnaires. Caught between dying in the open and charging their ambushers, the Legionnaires then stormed the Roderick and the surrounding buildings.

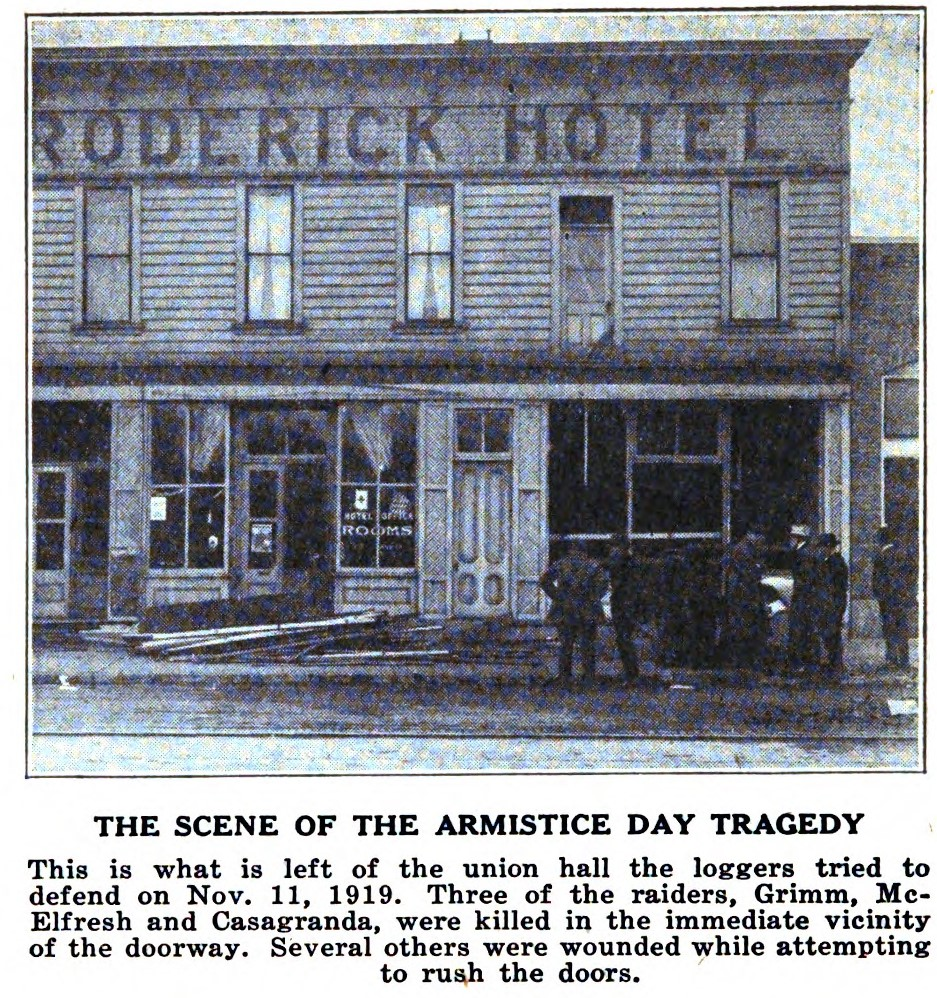
IWW Union HAll Centralia Washington

In contrast, the IWW claims that as the Legionnaires paused, a small group, possibly with Grimm's complicity, broke off and charged the Roderick with the intent to repeat the events of the previous year. When the initial group broke down the doors, the Wobblies, fearing for their lives, fired in self-defense. As the first group of Legionnaires fell back in disarray, Grimm was gut shot in the entrance of the hall leading a second group of attackers. McElfresh was then shot by John Doe Davis, one of the few Wobblies never to be captured, as he waited his turn outside.

Evidence supports and contradicts both theories. Firstly, Grimm's and McElfresh's wounds were caused by rifle bullets fired at medium to long range, not revolvers, and the blood trails from both men began in the middle of the street. In contrast, the IWW claims that Grimm and McElfresh were two of the three "secret committeemen" behind the Centralia Conspiracy and points to the significant fact that Grimm did give the order to halt in front of the Wobbly hall. The American Legion counters that by pointing out what they believe is the incriminating coincidence that Grimm and McElfresh were the first two men killed by the Wobblies, and both were shot in the street over 100 feet away from the Roderick on the north side of Second Street on Tower Avenue. The IWW responds with a statement by Dr. Frank Bickford, asserting that he had personally led the raid and that the Legionnaires initiated the conflict. Bickford later testified that "the door of the I.W.W. was kicked open before the shooting from inside began." The Legionnaires counter that Bickford was a lying braggart and, by his own admission on the stand, was legally deaf and so could not have known when the shooting actually started. The Legionnaires further counter with statements from the IWW member Tom Morgan, who was inside the Wobbly hall during the massacre and testified "that shots were fired before any rush was made upon the I.W.W. Hall." The IWW replies that Tom Morgan committed perjury to "make a deal," as evidenced by all charges against him being dropped. Both sides have additional eyewitnesses that support their side of the story. Most of the witnesses supporting the IWW's version of events were members of various unions. Most of those supporting the American Legion's version were war veterans and local businessmen sympathetic to the Legion.

A close examination of the trial transcript and the most reasonable interpretation of the evidence is that Davis killed Grimm while he was firing from the Avalon Hotel; Those on Seminary Hill began firing; McElfresh was killed by Loren Roberts. Burt Bland is not known to have struck anyone with his rifle shots. O. C. Bland in the Arnold Hotel shoved his rifle through a window but cut his hand so badly he did not fire the weapon. Lamb was not armed

A third theory was advanced by the defense counsel George Vanderveer in his opening statement: "I exonerate now and forever the American Legion from any responsibility for this. They were made catpaws." According to Vanderveer, as the Centralia contingent of Legionnaires began to pass by the Wobbly hall, a small group of men attempted to storm the building. However, although a few Legionnaires as individuals may have participated, the main aggressors were from the Centralia Citizens' Committee and were acting at the behest of F.B. Hubbard, president of the Eastern Railway & Lumber Company. Grimm, facing partially backwards towards the first platoon, would have seen that movement and assumed that it was his troops. Thus, his command "Halt. Close Up." makes more sense and could have been an attempt to return the men to the parade. However, when Wobblies saw that smaller group of men start towards their union hall, they naturally opened fire. Since the main body of Legionnaires was facing forward, it would not have seen the smaller group and so honestly believed that it had been fired upon first. In addition, the packed Legionnaires, including Grimm, standing stationary in the street would have been the easiest targets.

Much of this theory depends upon the character of Grimm. Like Elmer Smith, he may simply have been a man unfortunately caught in the middle. Although anti-Wobbly, he also seemed a man of outstanding character who valued individual respect and order in the ranks.

Frederick W. McIntosh, an agent of the Bureau of Investigation (BOI), the precursor to the FBI, was sent to Centralia from Seattle on November 11 to investigate the shootings. McIntosh was shortly joined by his supervisor, Forrest Simmons. They interviewed 18 parade spectators as well as some participants in the parade. Testimony of three eyewitnesses standing directly across the street from the IWW offices corroborated the IWW's contention that the attack on the building took place before any shots were fired, and that the first shots came from inside the IWW hall, not from any other positions. The BOI's information tending to bolster the IWW's version of events was kept confidential and not shared with the union's defense attorneys.

After the opening movements, the subsequent series of events is somewhat agreed upon, as the group (or the second group) of enraged Legionnaires charged the hall. Legionnaire Bernard Eubanks took a bullet in the leg on the curb in front of the Wobbly hall and Eugene Pfitzer was shot through the arm. Inside the Hall only Wesley Everest and Becker did any firing. Then, as additional Legionnaires broke into the hall and began to overpower the armed men, the Wobbly Wesley Everest ran for the back of the hall. Everest escaped from the rear of the Roderick Hotel and shot two men in uniform:Cassagranda was killed while he was running west on Second Avenue and John Earl Watt was shot and wounded in the side and fell within a few feet of the mortally wounded Cassagranda. Ironically, Watt was not a member of the American Legion but a Wobbly. He had been invited to join the parade because he had served in the US Army. The Legionnaire Alva Coleman grabbed a nonfunctioning revolver from a captured Wobbly or a nearby house and began to chase Everest. Shot and wounded by Everest, he passed the revolver to Legionnaire Dale Hubbard, a noted athlete, who caught up with Everest as the Wobbly was trying to ford the Skookumchuck River. Pointing the useless revolver at Everest, Hubbard ordered Everest to drop his gun and surrender. It is not known whether Hubbard knew that his revolver was useless. Everest most certainly would have assumed it was working. Everest, unable to cross the river, turned and shot Hubbard three times.Reaching for a knife in his lumber clothing Everest was then captured, beaten, and thrown into jail. All of the captured Wobblies were taken to the local jail. Elmer Smith, who had not participated in the actual shootings, was also rounded up and incarcerated. There is also some confusion over whether IWW Secretary Britt Smith was jailed then or captured soon afterward. The Wobbly Loren Roberts, 16, turned himself in on November 13.

The last fatality was Deputy Sheriff John M. Haney, who was killed in Hanaford, Washington on November 15. He was shot by members of a posse from Centralia because he had failed to give the proper countersign.

Bert Bland was the last Wobbly captured, on November 19.

== Lynching of Wesley Everest ==
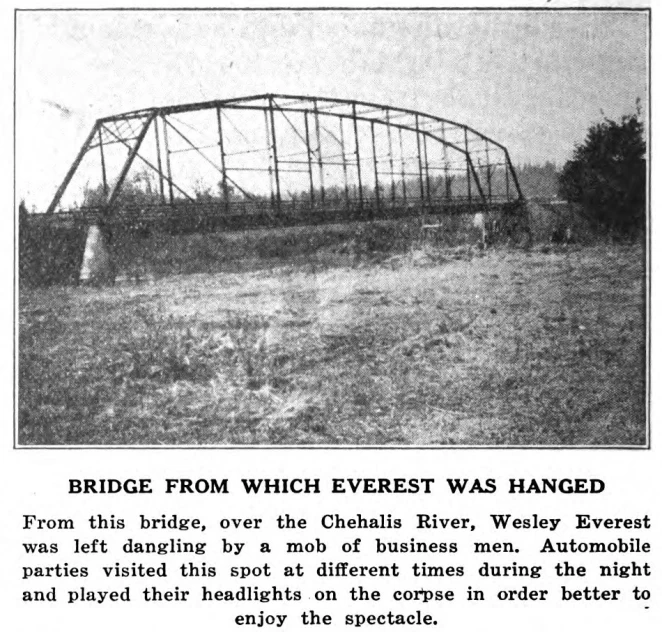
Mellen Street Bridge Centralia Washington

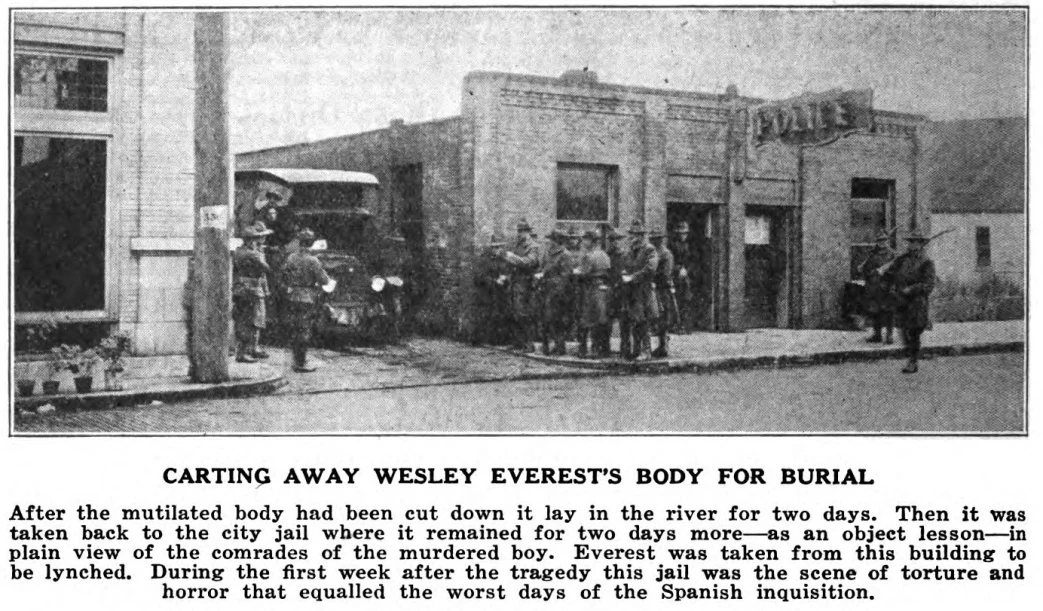
Everest Body taken from the Jail centralia Washington

As evening fell on November 11, 1919, popular feeling ran high, and a massive vigilante mob began to form outside the jailhouse. Electrical power to Centralia was cut off, and American Legionnaires ordered drivers to shut off their headlights. Hidden by the darkness that produced, the mob took Wesley Everest from the prison. Although Everest's personal identity was unknown, with some believing him to be the better known Britt Smith, he was positively recognized as the Wobbly who had shot and killed Hubbard. Everest was not the only Wobbly taken from the jail, according to testimony by Britt Smith.

Everest was taken to the Mellen Street Bridge over the Chehalis River and lynched. Early the next day, on November 12, 1919, his body was cut down and left in the river bottom. After that evening, someone returned his body to the jail with the rope he had been hanged with still around his neck. The only two local morticians refused to take the deceased Everest and his body was left on the jail floor adjacent to the cell holding the IWW prisoners until the next day, on November 13, 1919.

Later published versions, uncritically following the account published in "The Centralia Conspiracy" by the IWW member Ralph Chaplin six months after the shootings, said that Everest had been castrated before he was lynched. According to the author Tom Copeland, Chaplin and his co-author Walker Smith either fabricated the story or were the first to repeat the allegation in print.

A police report, filed on the day after the lynching, casts doubt on the castration story. The report includes a set of fingerprints and a description of the body but makes no mention of castration. The Lewis County Coroner, Dr. David Livingston, who led the parade on Armistice Day, was reported to be libeled. He was said by Wobbly sympathizers to be the person who had performed the castration of Wesley with a straight razor on the drive to the Chehalis River Bridge and to be the doctor who had refused to perform an autopsy.

== Aftermath ==
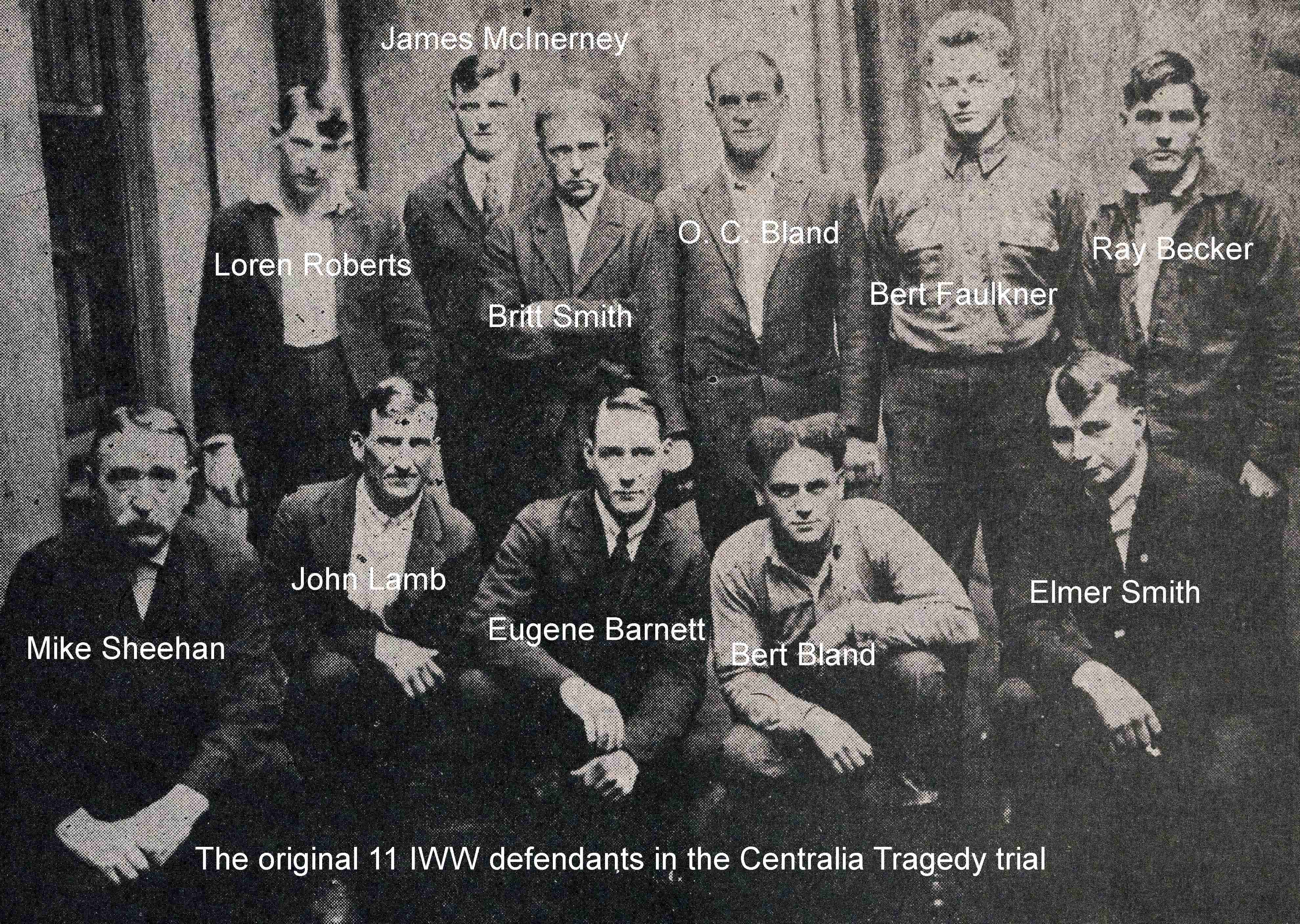
Labeled photo of eleven IWW defendants in Centralia Tragedy trial; Top Row Left to right:Loren Roberts; James McInereny; Brit Smith;O.C. Bland; Bert Faulkner; Ray Becker. Bottom Row left to right: Mike Sheehan; John Lamb; Eugene Barnett; Bert Bland; Elmer Smith

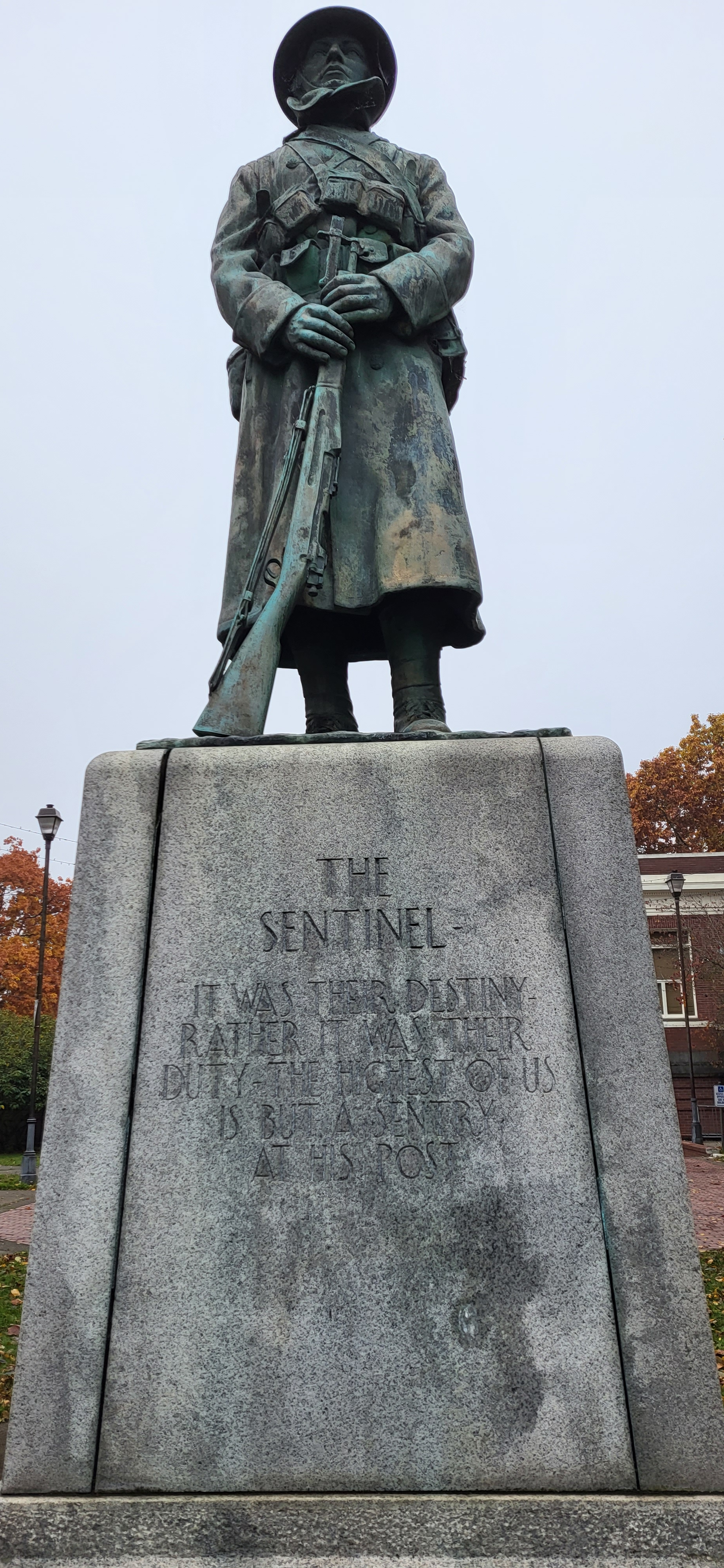
The Sentinel bronze statue

The captured Wobblies were charged with murder, and the resulting trial was held in Montesano, in nearby Grays Harbor County. After a trial that received national coverage, two Wobblies were acquitted, one was found not guilty by reason of insanity, two were found guilty of third degree murder, and the other five were convicted of second degree murder. Judge John Wilson refused to accept the verdict since Washington State law did not recognize a charge of third degree murder. After a few more hours of deliberation, the jury changed its verdict for those two prisoners. Those convicted were sentenced to prison terms of 25–40 years, which the author Tom Copeland wrote "shocked both the jury and the prisoners." The seven convicted IWW members appealed their lengthy sentences to the Washington Supreme Court, which unanimously affirmed Wilson's judgement in April 1921.

Within two years of the trial, seven of the twelve jurors repudiated their guilty verdict, believing they had not been allowed to hear all the evidence.

No person was ever charged or even investigated for Everest's murder or the Armistice Day hall raid that ushered in the Centralia Tragedy.

As time passed and passions cooled, a public campaign was spearheaded by Elmer Smith. In 1930, one prisoner [James McInerhey] died in jail, and another #9100 [Roberts (died 1976)] was released. In 1931, one prisoner #9414 [Barnett (died 1973)] were released. In 1932 #9409 O.C. Bland (died 1939) was paroled. In 1933, newly elected Governor Clarence D. Martin commuted or pardoned the sentences of three of the prisoners [9412 Lamb (died 1948), Smith, Bert Bland]. The last prisoner, Ray Becker, continued to maintain his innocence and refused to be paroled. In 1939, with help from liberal State Senator Mary Farquharson, his sentence was commuted to time served. Virtually all the released prisoners returned to their homes in Centralia, where they lived out the rest of their lives.

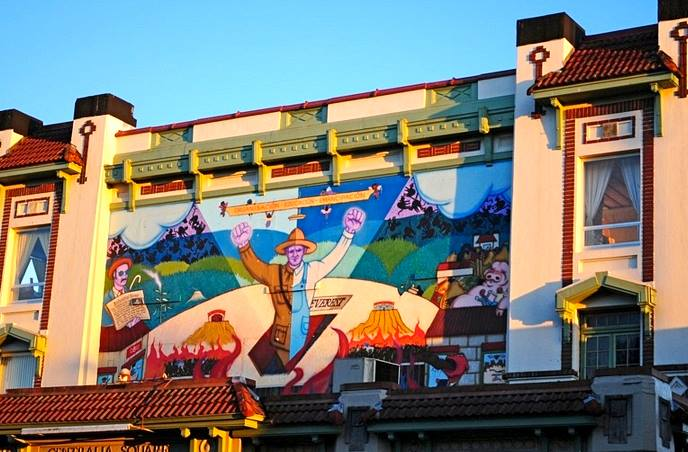
"The Resurrection of Wesley Everest," mural depicting IWW figures from the Centralia Massacre.

A bronze statue of a doughboy was erected in 1924 at Centralia's George Washington Park. The sculpture, The Sentinel created by Alonzo Victor Lewis, honors the four Legionnaires killed in the tragedy. Originally, a different statue, Spirit of the American Doughboy by E. M. Viquesney had won the American Legion's design award competition and the artwork was to be the monument placed in Centralia. In 1996, the Centralia Union Mural Project commissioned a mural on the north side of a former Elk's Lodge facing The Sentinel to memorialize Wesley Everest and the Wobblies to tell the union's side of the tragedy. "The Resurrection of Wesley Everest" was completed in 1997 by the socialist agitprop muralist Mike Alewitz despite controversy and opposition from the American Legion.

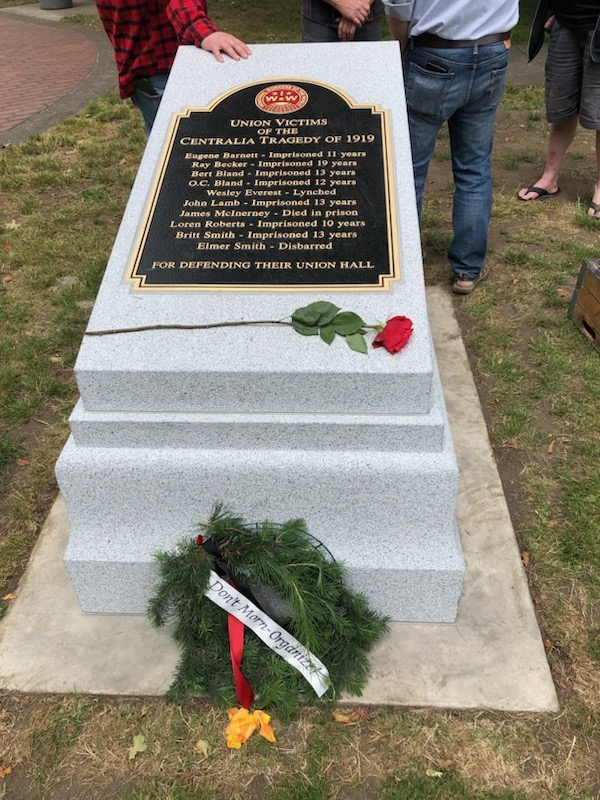
The IWW's Monument to Union Victims of the 1919 Centralia Tragedy in George Washington Park, Centralia, Washington. Funds raised by IWW, with contributions from IWW Branches, individual workers, regional labor councils, and local unions.

On November 11, 2019, the IWW held a 2-day public centennial commemoration of the tragedy in Centralia, featuring Wobbly speakers and musicians, as well as historians. Graves of the imprisoned IWW members were visited and wreath's laid. The IWW's General Executive Board delivered a pardon request to the state governor in late 2023 to vacate the judgments against the eight IWW members who were convicted. In 2023, a regional committee of IWW members formed to petition the Centralia City Council to permit the IWW to install a monument to the union victims of the Centralia Tragedy. On October 11, 2023, the council voted unanimously to grant the IWW's request. On June 23, 2024, the completed monument was installed in George Washington Park, next to ‘The Sentinel’, in a public dedication organized by the IWW's Centralia Committee.

The Wesley Everest Gravesite, the home of Francis Hubbard, and the statue of the doughboy are listed on the National Register of Historic Places.

== Killed ==
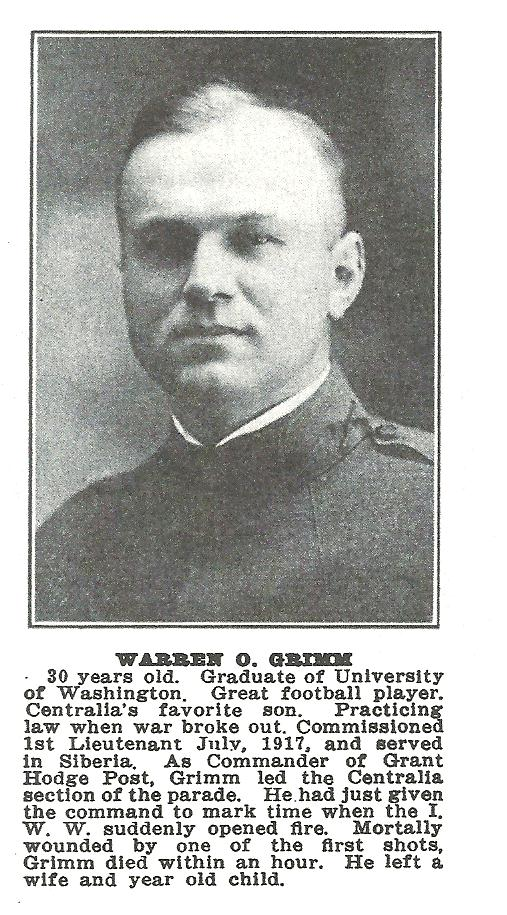
Warren Grimm

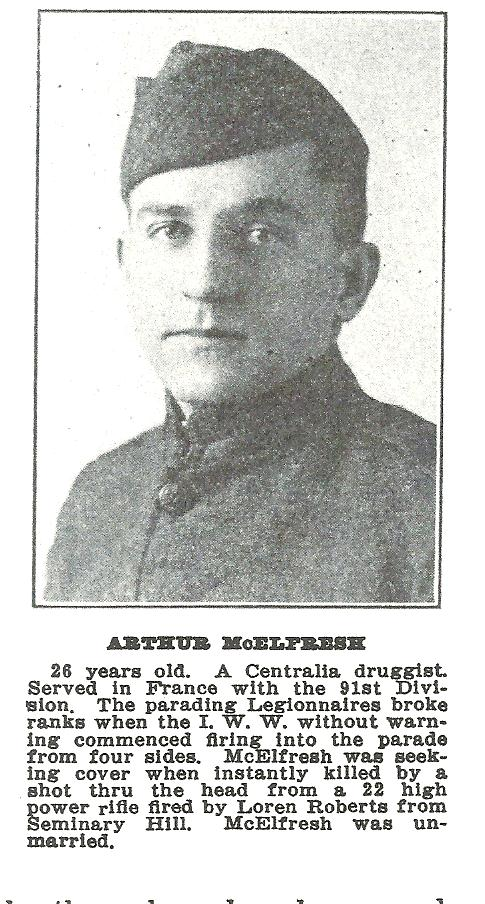
Arthur McElfresh

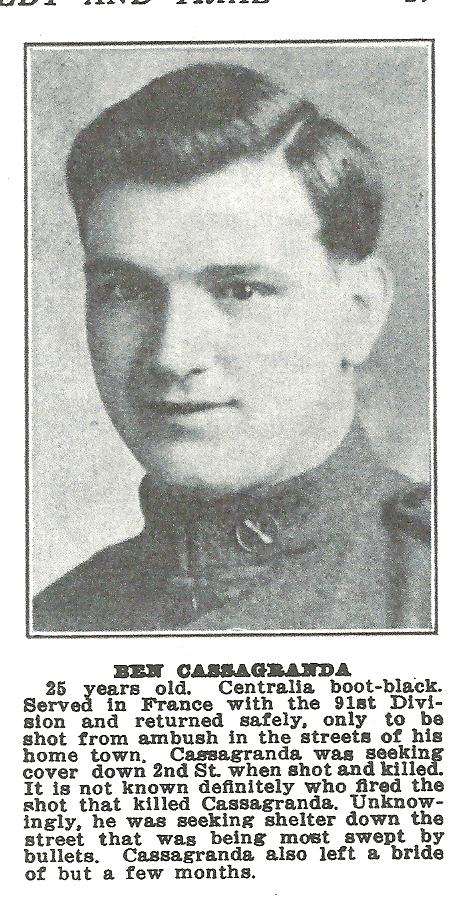
Ben Cassagranda

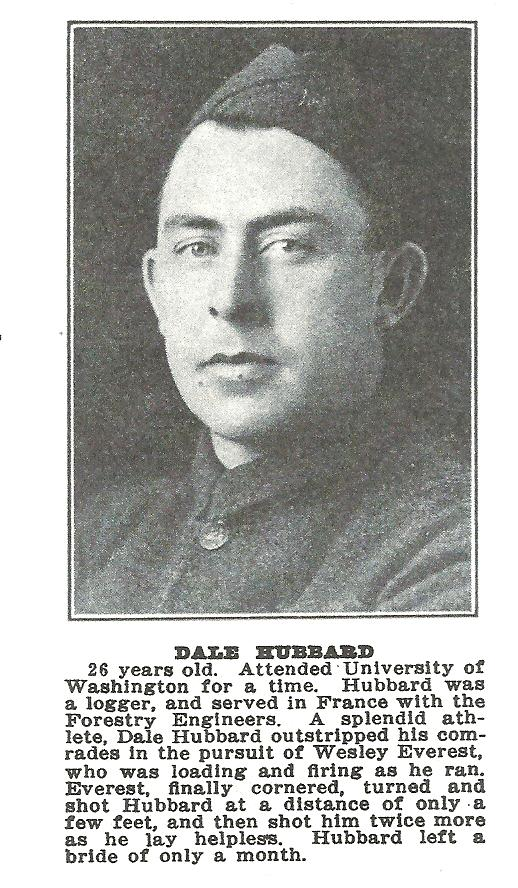
Dale Hubbard

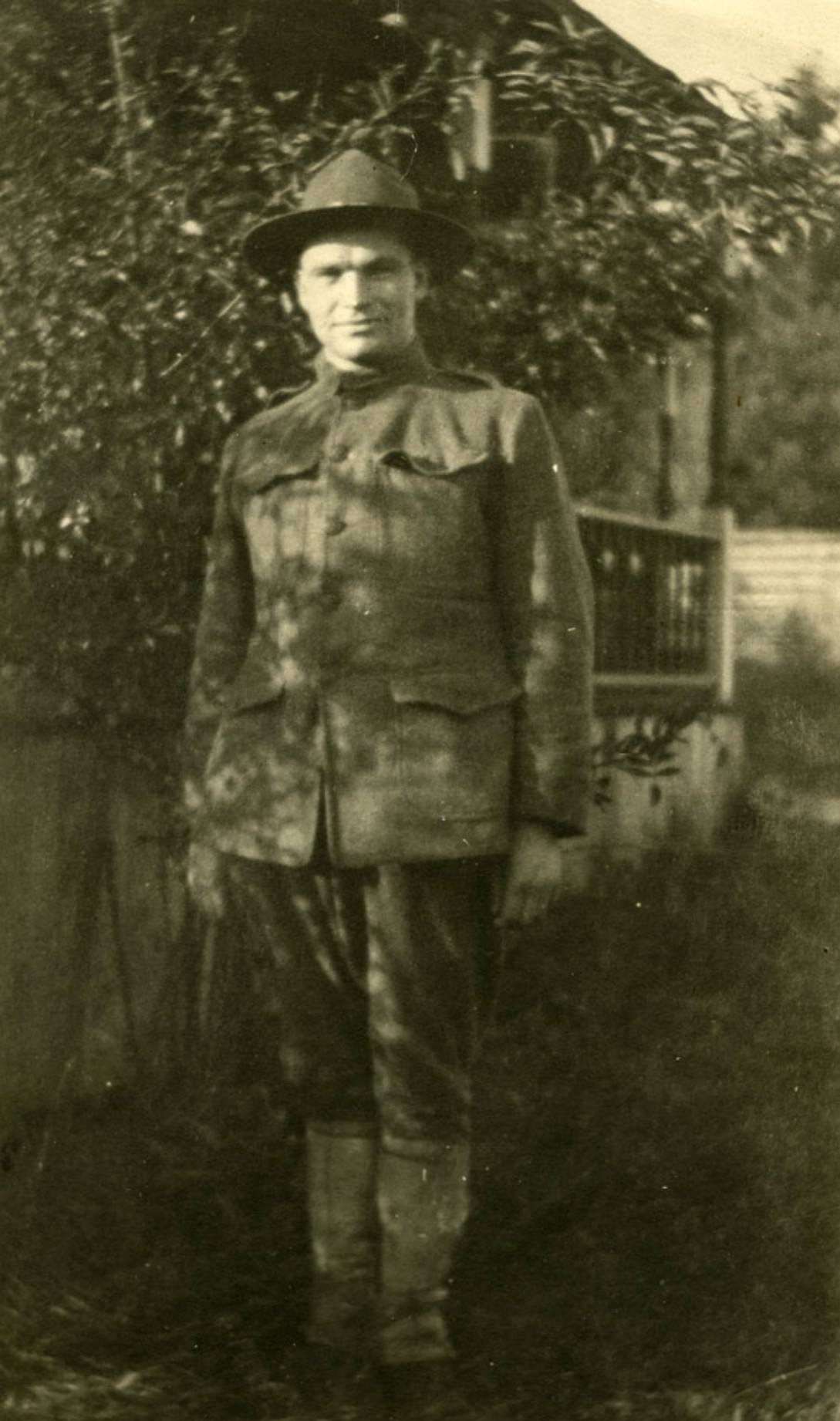
Wesley Everest

One significant fact not in dispute is the identities of the victims:

Killed:

- Warren Grimm, American Legion Post Commander
- Arthur McElfresh, American Legion
- Ben Cassagranda, American Legion
- Dale Hubbard, American Legion
- Wesley Everest, IWW
- John M. Haney, Centralia Deputy Sheriff

Wounded:

- Bernard Eubanks, American Legion
- Eugene Pfitzer, American Legion
- Alva Coleman, American Legion
- John Earl Watt, I.W.W. Member in parade

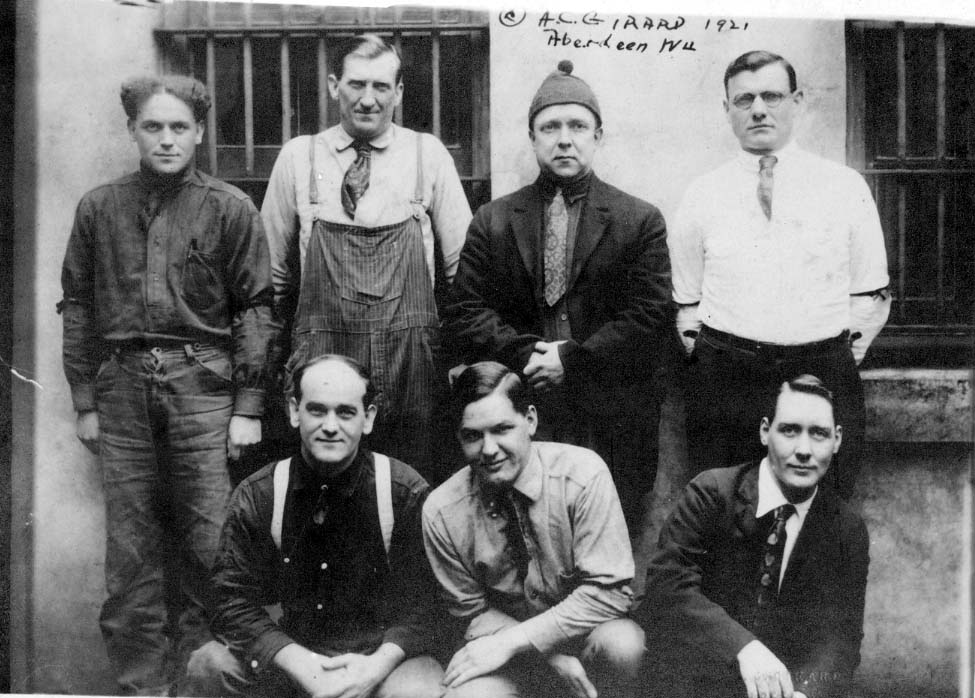
Back row - left to right: Bert Bland, John Lamb, Britt Smith,James McInerhey;Front row - left to right: O.C. Bland, Roy Becker, Eugene Barnett

Seven Wobblies were convicted of 2nd degree murder for their roles in the massacre:

- Eugene Barnett;
- Bert Bland;
- O.C. Bland;
- Ray Becker;
- John McInerney;
- John Lamb;
- Britt Smith

Mike Sheehan and Elmer Smith were acquitted. Loren Roberts was found not guilty by reason of insanity and committed to the state peniteniary indefinitely (he would later be transferred to state prison at Walla Walla with the other defendants). Charges against Bert Faulkner were dismissed. Tom Morgan, who decided to turn state's evidence, had his charges dropped.

== Legacy ==
The tragedy is mentioned in several literary and film works. Robert Cantwell, who was a teenager living near Centralia when the events occurred, would feature the theme of strikes in his works, including Laugh and Lie Down (1931) and The Land of Plenty (1934, 1971). The death of Wesley Everest is important in the character development of one of the main heroes of the novel Davita's Harp by Chaim Potok. The author, John Dos Passos, describes the riot in his U.S.A. Trilogy. A brief scene of the massacre is also featured in the 2011 film J. Edgar. The tragedy plays a central role in John Straley's mystery in the Cecil Younger series, Death and the Language of Happiness. Deep River (2019), by Karl Marlantes sweeping novel of early 20th century immigrant life in southwest Washington, touches on the Centralia and the IWW.

== See also ==
- List of massacres in Washington
- List of incidents of civil unrest in the United States
- Elmer Smith (activist)
- Wesley Everest
- Industrial Workers of the World

== Sources ==
- Tom Copeland, The Centralia Tragedy of 1919: Elmer Smith and the Wobblies. Seattle: University of Washington Press, 1993.
- Tom Copeland, "Wesley Everest, IWW Martyr," Pacific Northwest Quarterly, October 1986,
- Ester Barnett Goffinet, RIPPLES OF A LIE: a biographical/labor history of Eugene Barnett, a victim of the Centralia Washington conspiracy of 1919, Lewiston, ID: Esther Barnett Goffinet, 2010 (PO Box 414, Lewiston, Idaho 83501–0414)
- John McClelland, Wobbly War: The Centralia Story. Tacoma, WA: Washington State Historical Society, 1987.
- National Executive Committee of The American Legion (October 17, 2019). "Resolution No. 10: 100th Anniversary Remembrance Of Our Comrades In The 1919 Centralia Tragedy" (PDF). The American Legion Digital Archive. Indianapolis, Indiana: The American Legion. Archived from the original (PDF) on December 1, 2020.

=== Archives ===
- American Civil Liberties Union of Washington Records. 1917–2019. 188.31 cubic feet (including 13 microfilm reels and 1 videocassette) plus 62 cartons and 2 rolled posters. At the Labor Archives of Washington, University of Washington Libraries Special Collections.
- American Legion, Department of Washington Records. 1919–1920. .5 linear feet (4 microfilm reels : positive; 4 microfilm reels : negative). At the Labor Archives of Washington, University of Washington Libraries Special Collections.
- E. Raymond Attebery Papers. 1913–1979. 1.55 cubic ft. At the Labor Archives of Washington, University of Washington Libraries Special Collections.
- Rayfield Becker Papers. 1919–1939. .28 cubic foot. At the Labor Archives of Washington, University of Washington Libraries Special Collections.
- Industrial Workers of the World, Seattle Joint Branches Records. 1890–1965. 3.31 cubic feet. At the Labor Archives of Washington, University of Washington Libraries Special Collections.
- Eugene Barnett Oral History Collection. 1940–1961. .21 cubic feet (1 box). At the Labor Archives of Washington, University of Washington Libraries Special Collections.
