= Wesley Everest Gravesite =

NRHP-listed site in Centralia, Washington

- U.S. National Register of Historic Places
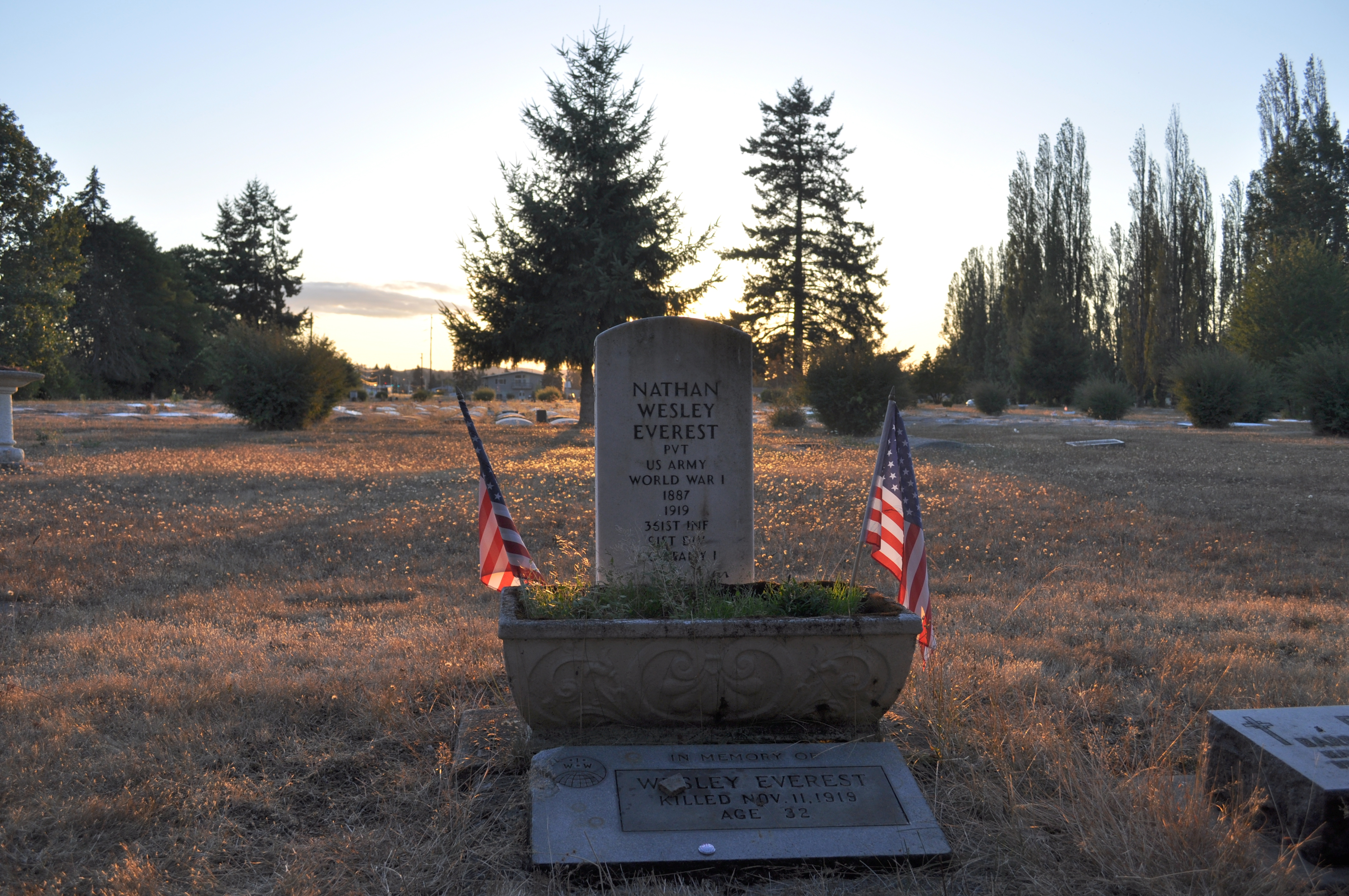
- Wesley Everest Gravesite, 2012

- Location within Washington (state)
- Location: Sticklin—Greenwood Memorial Park, 1905 Johnson Road, Centralia, Washington
- Coordinates: 46°44′09.8″N 122°58′55.1″W
- Area: less than one acre
- Built: 1932
- Built by: Carl J. Setterberg
- MPS: Properties Associated with Centralia Armistice Day, 1919
- NRHP reference No.: 91001781
- Added to NRHP: December 17, 1991

The Wesley Everest Gravesite is a historic landmark located in a memorial park cemetery in Centralia, Washington and has been listed on the National Register of Historic Places since 1991. The burial plot is that of Wesley Everest, a member of the Industrial Workers of the World (IWW) who was lynched in the aftermath of the 1919 Centralia Tragedy.

The gravesite, located in a pauper's cemetery, is the only existing site remaining that is connected to the IWW's role in the event, also known as the Armistice Day Riot or as the Centralia Massacre.

== History ==
=== Wesley Everest ===
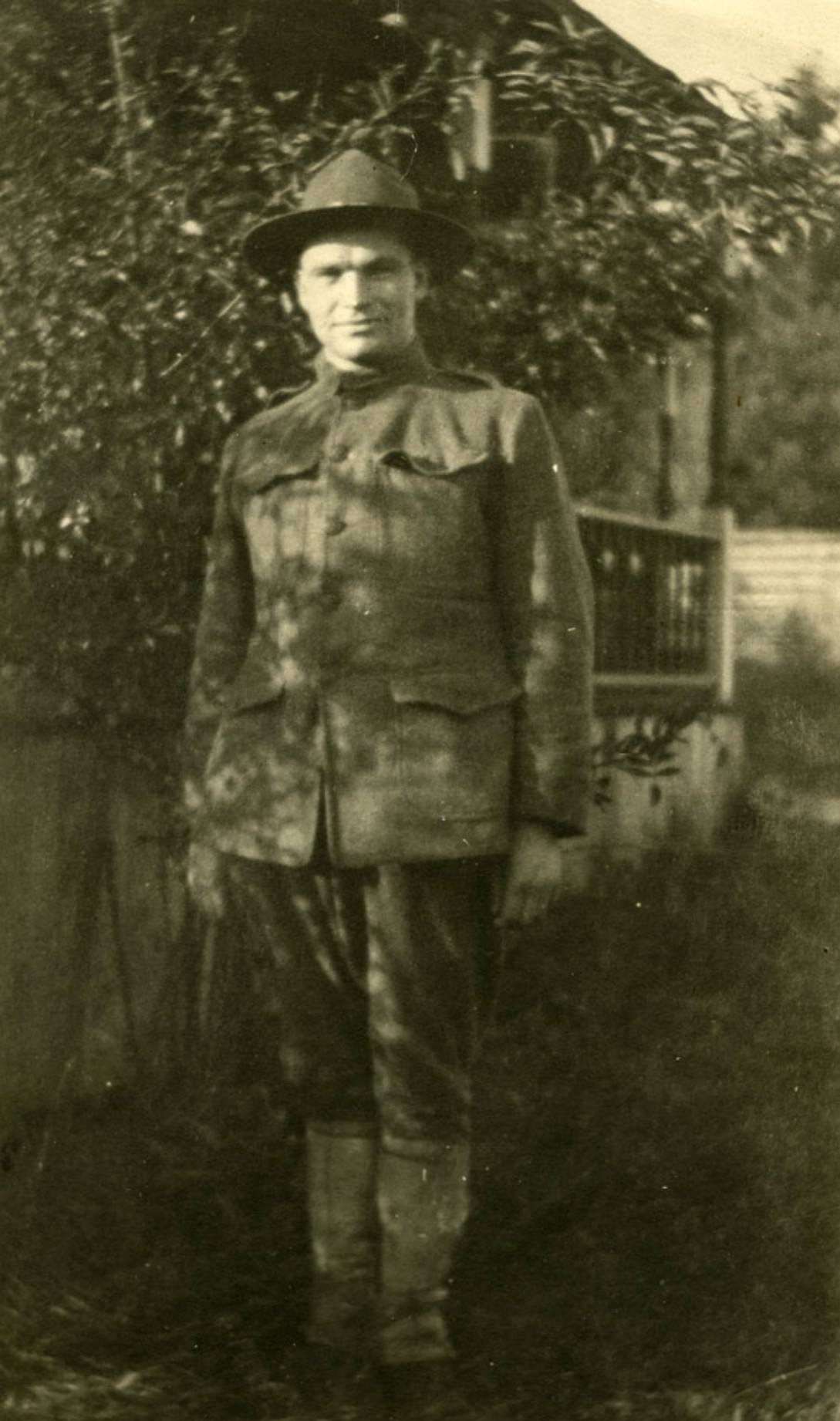
Everest in uniform, 1919

Wesley Everest was born near Newberg, Oregon in 1890, becoming a farm worker in his adolescence. Everest began working in the timber and railroad industry in his late teenage years. Factual evidence of Wesley Everest's life before his lynching is scarce, but he was described as courageous, sincere, silent, yet passionate about the Industrial Workers of the World (IWW). The earliest mention of Everest's involvement with the IWW was noted in 1913. He was considered a strike leader and was jailed for vagrancy after an IWW organizing effort in Marshfield, Oregon. Everest was taken out of his cell by a mob, forced to kneel and kiss an American flag, and run out of town.

Everest was drafted in 1917 during World War I but his service record is scant. Most likely due to his logging background, he served in a U.S. Army logging unit known as the Spruce Production Division in Washington state. Stories after his death suggested he was a sharpshooter and saw combat in Europe during the Great War but this has been disproven. Reports mention that he was opposed to the war and spent time in a military stockade as he often refused to salute the American flag. He was discharged from military service in March 1919 and although eligible for membership with the American Legion, he rejoined the IWW, becoming an active organizer after moving to Centralia, Washington.

In the immediate years after Everest's death, he was written about or shown artistically as a martyr. A mural featuring Everest along with several symbolic features of the IWW, known as The Resurrection of Nathaniel Wesley Everest, was created in 1997 by Wobblies at the Centralia Square Antique Mall, a former Elks Lodge, opposite the George Washington Park and its accompanying tributes to the Centralia Tragedy. Myths and legends grew about Everest's personal and military life, such as being labeled as a war hero, as a prominent member and organizer of the IWW, and the lead shooter during the November 11, 1919 riot.

=== Death ===
During the events of the Armistice Day Riot on November 11, 1919, Everest was captured after he and his fellow Wobblies (Note: "Wobblies" is a non-pejorative nickname for members of the Industrial Workers of the World (IWW). The origin of the moniker remains uncertain.) retreated from the Roderick Hotel in the city's downtown district. Taking a different route than his other IWW members, he ran towards the Skookumchuck River and after a brief exchange of gunfire where Everest wounded two pursuers, killing one, (Note: Sources sometimes report that both of the men Everest shot were killed.) he was dragged through the streets of Centralia. Reports mention he may have been severely beaten, including a puncture to his cheek and the loss of several teeth. An attempt to lynch Everest from a telephone pole was aborted and he was held at the city jail. Despite his injuries, he was reported as stating to the mob, "You fellows can't hang me. I was sent to do my duty and I did it."

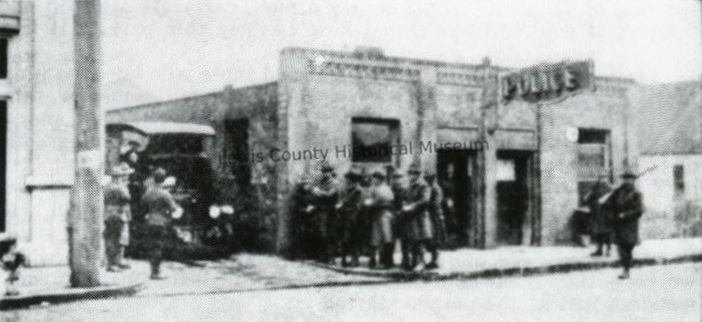
Transporting Everest's body from the jail to his burial

That evening, a main switch outside the jail was closed creating a power outage. (Note: Sources vary greatly on the power shortage. While a majority of reporting mentions the power was cut off from outside the jail, there are mentions that the lights went out by actions taken at the city's electrical station. See sources throughout the article.) A crowd entered the jail and took Everest, at first mistaking him for an IWW leader. Everest was placed into an automobile and driven to the Mellen Street Bridge west of the city. With a rope attached to a cross beam of the bridge, a noose was placed around his neck and Everest was pushed over the side. The rope was found to be too short and a longer cord was found. Everest was again pushed over the edge and was hanged. Everest, from reporting in newspapers and wire services favorable to the IWW cause, did not cry out in pain during the events. (Note: Despite reports that Everest was mostly silent from the time he was taken from jail up until his death, additional sources record his last words as, "For Christ's sake, shoot me! Don't let me suffer like this." or as "I got my man and done my duty. String me up now if you want to, damn you!") The same reports made mention that he may have been bayoneted and that he was continually assaulted, including having skin ripped from his face. His remains hung for hours and onlookers turned on headlights of their automobiles as the day turned to night. His body, filled with possibly as many as 20 bullets, was cut down and left in the Chehalis River.

His corpse was recovered the next evening, reported as dragged through the streets, and paraded in front of his fellow prisoners. Everest's body was eventually placed on the floor of the jail cell, still occupied by his fellow Wobblies, until his burial. (Note: Undertakers and the city coroner refused to handle Everest's body.) Despite witnesses, evidence, and some attempts at prosecution for the lynching, no person involved with his hanging was ever charged nor brought to trial.

=== Burial ===
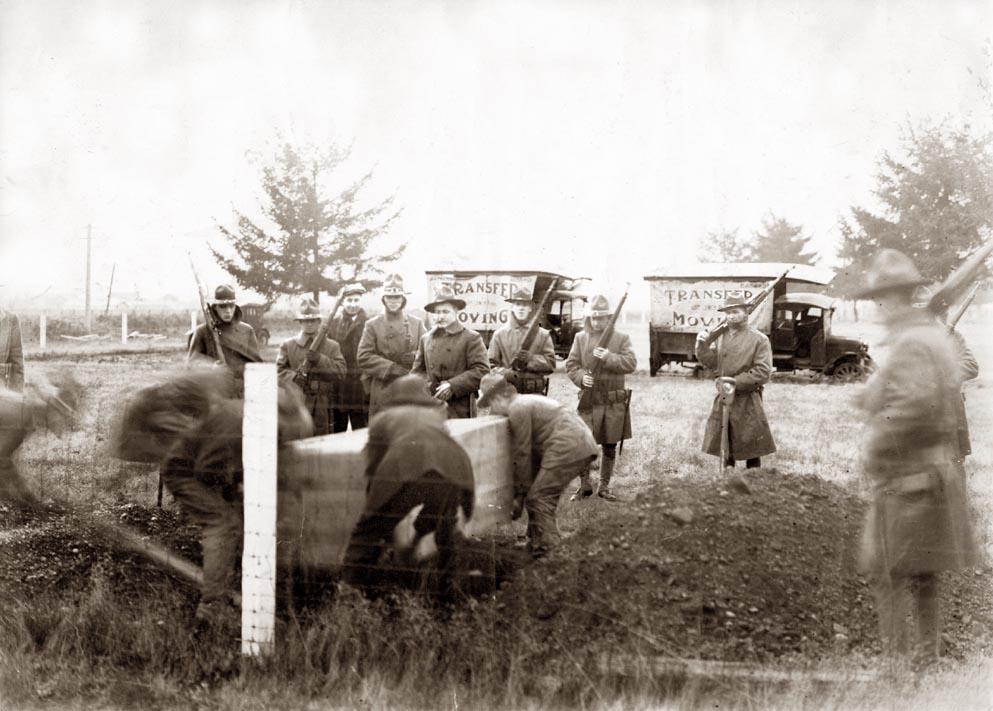
Everest burial

Everest's funeral and burial, held on November 13, 1919, was without ceremony; the attendance of family members and a formal funeral service were disallowed. Four of the incarcerated Wobblies built a simple wood coffin and between four and six IWW prisoners dug the grave at Greenwood Park Cemetery. The funeral was attended by a limited few, including the coroner, several news reporters, and by members of a National Guard squad who were on-site after being called in after the November 11th events. His grave was at first unmarked, thought to be a means to prevent vandalism. On Memorial Day, 1921, a small ceremony at the gravesite was organized by the Centralia IWW to honor Everest. The original gravestone was not added until the late 1930s.

Myths and legends of Everest's death grew immediately after the lynching. An uncorroborated theory suggests that Everest infiltrated a meeting that planned the November 11, 1919 incident. Hidden under the guise of his doughboy uniform, his death was due to his being recognized and thus targeted to silence his knowledge of the attendees of the meeting. Reports suggest that Everest, either on his way to his lynching or at the Mellen Street Bridge, was castrated, but no evidence has ever been found to verify these accounts nor repute the autopsy and witnesses to Everest's body before his burial. A narrative exists, despite evidence, that Everest's body was dragged behind a horse while being transported to his grave. Media favorable to the plight of the IWW, and demanding justice for Everest's death, reported that a second lynching also occurred and that Everest was not buried in the plot known under the NRHP listing. The city coroner, who officially deemed Everest's death a suicide, continued the self-inflicted death narrative, once speaking at an Elk's club meeting that Everest twice attempted to hang himself, and then committed fatal, self-inflicted gunshot wounds to his body after both hanging attempts did not kill him.

== Geography ==
The gravesite is located in Centralia's Sticklin-Greenwood Memorial Park, a public cemetery situated southeast of Ford's Prairie and northwest of the city's downtown core. The rail station known as Blakeslee Junction is immediately to the east. The grounds are considered a pauper's cemetery and the gravesite is near the intersection of Reynolds Avenue and Johnson Road, in a section of the cemetery known as the Garden of Freedom.

== Appearance and site features ==
The grave of Wesley Everest is a small rectangular parcel unconnected to any other monument or site in the cemetery under the National Register of Historic Places (NRHP) listing. The grave is marked by a granite headstone slab lying embedded in the ground. A concrete flower box rests behind the gravestone. The flat, 12 in × 24 in (300 mm × 610 mm) marker, considered simple, contains a carved IWW emblem and the following epitaph:

In memory of

Wesley Everest
Killed Nov. 11, 1919

Age 32

The headstone lacks the customary date of birth, manner of death, or mentions of family. A discrepancy in his birth year, often cited as 1890, and his age listed on the marker, is noted in the NRHP form.

The grave marker was most likely carved by Carl J. Setterberg, a carver employed by the Centralia Monumental Works between 1937 and 1939. Records that indicate who ordered the headstone have not been found. The flower box, which rests on a concrete base, is considered part of the overall NRHP listing, and contains fluted, dentil-style carvings. At the time of the NRHP nomination, the site was reported as being mostly unaltered except for a slight chip of the granite headstone, thought to be accidental and not an act of vandalism.

A marble, U.S. Army military headstone was added approximately in 2002 after a request the prior year from the owner of the cemetery at the time.

== Significance ==
Added to the National Register of Historic Places on December 17, 1991, (Note: News sources often cite the nomination and acceptance of the gravesite to the NRHP in 1993. See various sources, post-1993, throughout the page.) the Wesley Everest Gravesite was noted as being the only existing site that had a direct connection to the IWW's role during the Centralia Tragedy. Locations such as the IWW Hall at the Roderick Hotel, the city jail that held Wobbly suspects, and the Mellen Street "Hangman's" Bridge, (Note: The Mellen Street "Hangman's Bridge" was replaced in 1959.) had all been replaced or torn down. No other known location connected to Everest's life has been found.

The nomination noted the symbolic issues of the time and its connection to the union movement of the era. While most grave sites are not often eligible for listing on the NRHP, the Everest gravesite was an exception based on two themes - events of the 1919 Centralia Armistice Day violence and the martyred death of Everest. Additional historical and political context, as well as the lack of other properties directly connected to the 1919 events, were contributing factors for the NRHP listing. The headstone's ornate IWW emblem is considered highly unusual, often not seen on the markers of other notable Wobblies.

In 1922, the Veterans of Foreign Wars, after an annual gathering in Seattle, voted to decorate Everest's grave in honor of his World War I service. Annually on Labor Day, pro-union messages are often left at the grave. A memorial service, marking the 100th anniversary of the Centralia Tragedy, was held at the gravesite in November 2019.

Everest's lynching is thought to be the last known hanging by mob in Washington state.

== See also ==
- Hubbard Bungalow
- The Sentinel (Centralia, Washington statue)
