= Warren Grimm =

American football player (1888–1919)

- Grimm, c. 1911

Personal information
- Born: March 9, 1888; Lewistown, Pennsylvania, U.S.
- Died: November 11, 1919 (aged 31); Centralia, Washington, U.S.

Career information
- College: Washington

Awards and highlights
- Second-team All-American (1919)

Warren O. "Wedge" Grimm (March 9, 1888 – November 11, 1919) was an All-American at the University of Washington and an officer in the United States Army, he served with distinction as part of the American Expeditionary Force Siberia stationed in Russia in 1918–19. He was killed on November 11, 1919, during the Centralia Massacre in Washington State.

== Youth ==
Born in Lewistown, Pennsylvania, Grimm moved to Centralia, Washington, at the age of four. He regularly achieved high academic marks and was a star on the local high school football team. Upon graduation, Grimm worked as a clerk in the Assessor's Office of King County, Washington, to pay for college. This experience led to his interest in the practice of law.

Grimm then attended the University of Washington, entering in the fall of 1908. During the following years, Grimm was best known for his athletic prowess, earning All-American honors on Washington's famous football teams of the era. The leader of his freshman class, Grimm also joined the Sigma Nu fraternity.

In those days, hazing was still an acceptable practice. The University of Washington had a traditional melee between each year's freshman and sophomore classes, the goal of which was to identify potential Huskies and to see who could tie up the others. It was at this inaugural event that Grimm earned the nickname "Wedge" that would identify him on football fields throughout the Northwest. Chosen Captain of the Freshman "tie-up" squad because of his size, Grimm actually showed his tactical acumen and organized his classmates into a tightly focused wedge that charged the sophomore formation. This highly successful maneuver became a staple of Husky football teams and contributed to his later All-American honors.

In 1910, Grimm was awarded the Flaherty medal by the University of Washington. He was also honored with memberships in every honor society to which he was eligible including the Oval Club and Fir Tree. His growing potential in the practice of law was also noticed and he was awarded membership in Phi Delta Phi, a national law school honorary fraternity.

After graduation from law school he returned to his home in Centralia. He was made deputy prosecuting attorney but, at the end of his term, decided to enter into private practice with his brother, Huber "Polly" Grimm. In 1914, Warren married Ina Olive Gilbert. Unfortunately, Warren would soon become a widower when Ina developed diabetes and died on April 12, 1917.

== World War I ==
When the United States entered World War I, Grimm put his private practice on hold and volunteered for the Army. Sent to Officers Training Camp, he earned a commission of First Lieutenant and was assigned to the 12th Infantry. The 12th was ordered to Camp Fremont in January, 1918. On April 15, 1918, Lt. Grimm received exceptional leave as he would once again tie the knot, this time to Miss Verna Barstad, Kappa Sigma, who was Centralia's librarian.

In August 1918, Grimm's regiment was ordered to Siberia as part of the American Expeditionary Force Siberia (A.E.F. Siberia), under the command of General William S. Graves. Upon arrival at Vladivostok, Grimm was assigned to Co. I of the 31st Infantry and was stationed on guard duty about one hundred miles north of the Siberian seaport. Lieutenant Grimm was then transferred to Hardin, Manchuria, and assumed command of the 50 man detachment. In December, 1918, Grimm was rotated back to the HQ Company of the 31st Infantry and served as legal attaché for General Graves. Successfully completing its tour of duty, Grimm's company left Vladvistock on April 1, 1919, and returned to San Francisco.

Grimm returned to Centralia to greet his wife and see his infant daughter, Shirley Ann, who had been born during his deployment. The town of Centralia decided to reward him for his combat service and elected him Commander of the Grant Hodge Post of the American Legion. Grimm also resumed his private law practice at this time.

== IWW ==
The Industrial Workers of the World (Wobblies) is a revolutionary labor union based in Chicago. In Washington, the IWW had a strong presence among timber workers. A contentious relationship between the IWW and the town went as far back as 1914 when 47 members entered the town seeking bread for hungry workers. Denied assistance, the group was forced to leave town.

In 1917, the IWW opened a Union Hall in Centralia. The hall was attacked in 1918 during a Red Cross parade, most probably at the hands of the local lumber companies and with support from Centralia's Elk Lodge. Consequently, by the fall of 1919, relations between Wobblies and businessmen hostile to labor were fraught with tension. Whether by design or unfortunate circumstance Grimm would become the first casualty of the Centralia Massacre.

== Centralia Massacre ==
In Centralia, Washington, where the IWW had been organizing lumber workers, the lumber interests made plans to get rid of the IWW. On November 11, 1919, Armistice Day, the Legion paraded through town with rubber hoses and gas pipes, and the IWW prepared for an attack. When the Legion passed the IWW hall, shots were fired – it is unclear who fired first. They stormed the hall, there was more firing, and Legionnaires Warren Grimm and Arthur McElfresh were killed in this initial confusion of shots. Of the seven Wobblies inside the hall, only Wesley Everest and Ray Becker fired any shots. It is unclear, of the men posted at other stations, who or how many fired upon the raiding Legionnaires. A total of four members of the American Legion were killed and five wounded.

Inside the headquarters was an IWW member, a lumberjack named Wesley Everest, a former ex-soldier {although he had not served overseas} while the IWW national leaders were on trial for obstructing the war effort. Everest was in army uniform and carrying a rifle. He emptied it into the crowd, dropped it, and ran for the woods, followed by a mob. He started to wade across the river, found the current too strong, turned, shot the leading man Dale Hubbard dead, threw his gun into the river, and fought the mob with his fists. They dragged him back to town behind an automobile, suspended him from a telegraph pole, took him down, locked him in jail. That night, his jailhouse door was broken down, he was dragged out, put on the floor of a car, and then he was taken to a bridge, hanged, and his body riddled with bullets.

No one was ever arrested for Everest's murder, but eleven Wobblies were put on trial for killing an American Legion leader during the parade, and six of them spent fifteen years in prison.

== Aftermath ==
Grimm's wife and infant daughter attended every day of the trial and subsequent convictions and sentencing. However, by this point, the IWW allegedly sent death threats to Mrs. Grimm, Judge John M. Wilson, who presided over the trial, Lewis County and Centralia officials, and some of the testifying Legionnaires. As a result, Mrs. Grimm and her daughter were placed under Federal protection and relocated.

== See also ==
- List of members of the American Legion
