= Fords Prairie, Washington =

- Census-designated place
- Location of Fords Prairie, Washington
- Coordinates: 46°44′50″N 123°00′10″W
- Country: United States
- State: Washington
- County: Lewis

Area
  - Total: 3.85 sq mi (9.98 km^{2})
  - Land: 3.73 sq mi (9.65 km^{2})
  - Water: 0.13 sq mi (0.33 km^{2})
- Elevation: 167 ft (51 m)

Population (2020)
  - Total: 2,234
  - Density: 530/sq mi (203/km^{2})
- Time zone: UTC-8 (Pacific (PST))
  - Summer (DST): UTC-7 (PDT)
- ZIP Code: 98531
- Area code(s): 360, 564
- FIPS code: 53-24565
- GNIS feature ID: 2408227

Fords Prairie is an unincorporated community and census-designated place (CDP) in Lewis County, Washington, United States. The population was 2,234 at the 2020 census.

== History ==
=== Native American settlement ===
The area was originally called "Tasunshun", meaning "resting place", by the Upper Chehalis tribe, the Quiyaisk. The tribe kept a permanent village on the lands, often used during the winter. Dwellings were usually huts in a tipi-style construction of cedar planks.

=== Beginnings of Fords Prairie ===
Fords Prairie was named after Judge Sidney S. Ford Sr. and his wife Nancy, who were among the earliest white pioneers who settled north of the Columbia River in 1846 in what was then a part of Oregon Territory. The Fords followed the wagon trail created by Michael T. Simmons, founder of what would become Tumwater and George Waunch, of Waunch Prairie. Receiving permission from the Quiyasik, their 640-acre (260 ha) (Note: The Ford family land donation claim varies in size based on the source, in some cases listed as 620 acres (250 ha).) Donation Land Claim abutting the Chehalis River became the center of what became known as Fords Prairie, for a time an important travelling stop between the Columbia River and Puget Sound. Other notable settlers during the time were Patterson F. Luark, J.K. Lum, and Charles Van Wormer. Van Wormer became postmaster in the area, his home serving as a post office for a brief time in the early 1860s.

The location of the Ford family's home has been lost though it was described as being on a bank of the Chehalis River, in view from the wagon road. Foundation stones of the Ford home were reported as still visible by 1927. The log cabin home was two-stories, with an exterior stairwell to the top floor, and boasted a rock fireplace large enough to burn 4 foot (1.2 metres) logs. Ford owned an indigenous slave, purchased for a pony that saved the person's life; Ford released the unnamed man from servitude two years later. Ford's relationship with local tribespeople were friendly and he was called "Sintah" or "Mr. Poots"; other family members were given Chehalis language monikers as well. The first governor of the Washington Territory, Isaac Stevens, stayed at the Fords home on his travels to Olympia in December 1854.

The Ford home was used as a courthouse, with documentation showing county and territorial meetings as early as October 4, 1847. The status of the first official courthouse, between the Ford home and the Jackson Courthouse on Jackson Prairie, remains in dispute.

During the Puget Sound War in 1855, over 200 residents moved to Fort Henness in Grand Mound for 16 months. A temporary school was started at the fort. Ford remained on his homestead, converting two homes on the property into a blockhouse. Ford worked as an Indian agent between settlers and the Native American population and offered his acreage for use to indigenous families as a place for safety during the contentious time. Settlers built and opened a waystation and inn known as the Halfway House, due to the community's middle location on the wagon trail. Constructed in either 1852 or 1854, it was demolished in the late 1880s to make room for a modern building.

=== 20th century ===
A cherry tree, considered the largest remaining in the state, died in the early 1920s, its remains collapsing in a windstorm years later. Though the year it was planted is unknown, by 1888 the tree was measured with a circumference of 69 inches (180 cm) and a 32 foot (9.8 metres)-wide canopy.

Fords Prairie has slowly been annexed by Centralia with the first annexation beginning in 1946. A proposal to incorporate Fords Prairie as a city failed in May 1982. Residents voted 85% against the proposition, an action reported as going "down like a submarine with screen doors".

=== 21st century ===
The community was notified in late 2024 by the city of Centralia and several Lewis County departments that drinking water within Fords Prairie may be unsafe. Nitrate levels had been recorded as increasing in wells in 2023, leading to additional testing of private well water which confirmed a regional issue. No official announcement of contamination was issued but potential causes that were considered included seepage of bird manure from a local game farm and leaking septic systems.

== Geography ==
Fords Prairie is often considered a neighborhood of Centralia, which borders the community to the south. Grand Mound, in Thurston County, borders Fords Prairie to the north. Interstate 5 forms the eastern edge of the CDP, with access from Exit 82 (Harrison Avenue) in Centralia.

According to the United States Census Bureau, the Fords Prairie CDP has a total area of 3.9 square miles (10.0 km^{2}), of which 3.7 square miles (9.7 km^{2}) are land and 0.1 square miles (0.3 km^{2}), or 3.27%, are water. The community sits on the east side of the Chehalis River, which flows northwest to the Pacific Ocean at Grays Harbor.

== Demographics ==
Historical population
Census	Pop.	Note	%±
1960	1,404		—
1970	2,250		60.3%
1980	2,582		14.8%
1990	2,480		−4.0%
2000	1,961		−20.9%
2010	1,959		−0.1%
2020	2,234		14.0%
U.S. Decennial Census; 1970 1980 1990; 2000 2010 2020

As of the census of 2000, there were 1,961 people, 785 households, and 588 families residing in the CDP. The population density was 502.0 people per square mile (193.6/km^{2}). There were 820 housing units at an average density of 209.9/sq mi (81.0/km^{2}). The racial makeup of the CDP was 93.83% White, 0.05% African American, 1.07% Native American, 1.53% Asian, 0.31% Pacific Islander, 1.43% from other races, and 1.78% from two or more races. Hispanic or Latino of any race were 3.62% of the population.

There were 785 households, out of which 26.0% had children under the age of 18 living with them, 61.7% were married couples living together, 10.4% had a female householder with no husband present, and 25.0% were non-families. 19.6% of all households were made up of individuals, and 10.1% had someone living alone who was 65 years of age or older. The average household size was 2.49 and the average family size was 2.83.

In the CDP, the population was spread out, with 21.5% under the age of 18, 8.8% from 18 to 24, 20.7% from 25 to 44, 29.3% from 45 to 64, and 19.8% who were 65 years of age or older. The median age was 44 years. For every 100 females, there were 92.3 males. For every 100 females age 18 and over, there were 93.0 males.

The median income for a household in the CDP was $42,927, and the median income for a family was $47,829. Males had a median income of $34,073 versus $26,344 for females. The per capita income for the CDP was $21,610. About 4.2% of families and 7.2% of the population were below the poverty line, including 7.9% of those under age 18 and 7.0% of those age 65 or over.

== Arts and culture ==
Fords Prairie is the location of the Wesley Everest Gravesite, a National Register of Historic Places listing since 1991.

The community organized the Fords Prairie Grange which became a center point of social activity in the town.

== Parks and recreation ==
The Fort Borst Park complex, which includes the Borst Home and Pioneer Park Dog Park, is situated south of the area. The Discovery Trail, opened in 2006, meanders inside the riparian zone next to the Chehalis River, is northwest of the region. The community is home to the Bob Oke Game Farm, a pheasant hunting site funded and overseen by the Washington Department of Fish and Wildlife. The grounds were opened in the 1950s and known as the Lewis County Game Farm.

== Economy ==
Fords Prairie's economy was based mostly on farming since the community's beginnings, with small farm dairy production providing residents with financial security during the Great Depression. The town contained only one shop, the Raish General Store, which provided farming supplies, groceries, and hardware. The Raish store closed in the 1940s, the building eventually becoming home to various businesses.

The community's rural economy has been slowly replaced with the addition of the Port of Centralia, businesses such as Safeway, and major retailers located at the Centralia factory outlet center.

== Government and politics ==
Presidential Elections Results
Year	Republican	Democratic	Third parties
2008	59.2% 382	39.1% 252	1.7% 11
2012	61.2% 367	37.5% 225	1.3% 8
2016	69.6% 396	23.0% 131	7.4% 42
'2020	64.6% 508	32.3% 254	3.2% 25
2024	65.8% 460	30.0% 210	4.1% 29

As of 2024, Fords Prairie is considered part of Centralia's urban growth area. Both the county and city of Centralia are in a joint jurisdictional agreement, which includes determination of public utilities.

As Fords Prairie is an unincorporated community, there are no defined bounds and the voting precinct may be incongruous with the census boundaries.

The 2020 election included 14 votes for candidates of the Libertarian Party and 8 votes for write-in candidates. In the 2024 election, there were 5 votes cast for write-in candidates and 15 votes were tallied for Robert F. Kennedy Jr..

== Education ==
The first school in Fords Prairie was the Lum Schoolhouse, located on the corner of present-day Lum Road and Reynolds Avenue. The community's school district, by 1906, served 100 students and was at the time the largest rural school district in Lewis County. A wood, two-story school was constructed in 1916 for $13,000. The schoolhouse, which served students up to 10th grade, expanded in 1925 with a basement and playroom. The home economics class provided extra food to students during the later years of the Great Depression.

The Fords Prairie school district merged with Centralia in 1944 and the schoolhouse burned down in 1945. The community constructed a new school facility in 1947 which included the first kindergarten class in the town.

Centralia High School is located within Fords Prairie.
