= Wesley Everest =

American murder victim

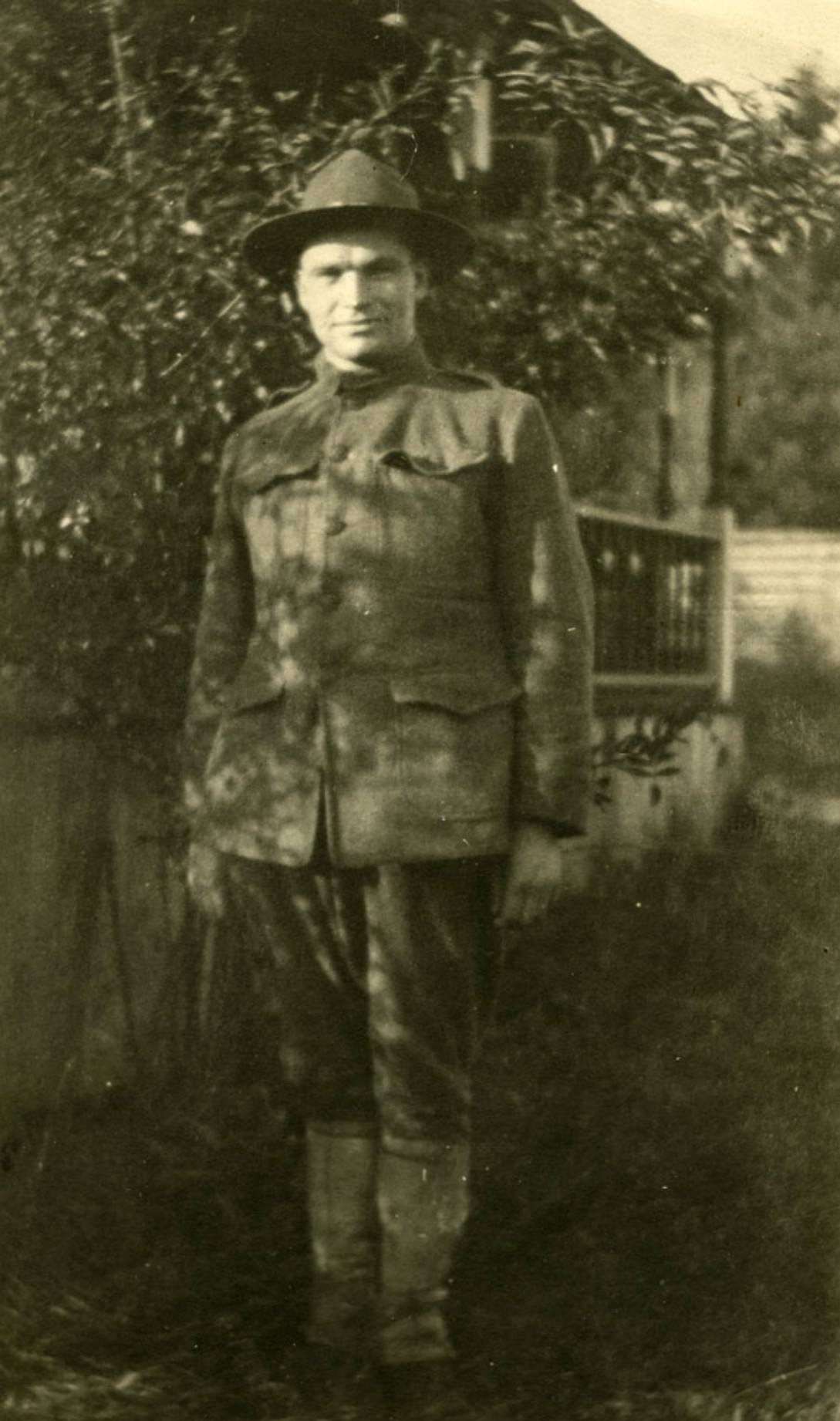
- Everest in uniform
- Born: Nathan Wesley Everest; December 29, 1890; Newberg, Oregon, U.S.
- Died: November 11, 1919 (aged 28); Centralia, Washington, U.S.
- Burial place: Wesley Everest Gravesite, Greenwood Memorial Park, Centralia, Lewis County, Washington, USA
- Military career
- Allegiance: United States
- Branch: United States Army
- Service years: September 17, 1917 – January 6, 1919 (active)
- Service number: 869,296
- Units: 361 Infantry to December 12, 1917 403 Aero Squadron to January 26, 1918; 442 Aero Squadron to February 14, 1918; 72 Spruce Squadron to October 21, 1918 140 Spruce Squadron to Discharge
- Conflicts: World War I

Nathan Wesley Everest (December 29, 1890 – November 11, 1919) was an American member of the Industrial Workers of the World (IWW) and a World War I era veteran. He was lynched during the Centralia Tragedy after killing Dale Hubbard in what the union called self-defense, though the American Legion called it murder. His burial plot, the Wesley Everest Gravesite, has been listed on the National Register of Historic Places since 1991.

== Military service ==
Everest was drafted into the army in November 1917 and was a member of the Spruce Production Division in Vancouver, Washington, which supplied timber for building airplanes, railroad cars, and other vital wartime equipment. Everest spent much of his time in the Vancouver stockade for refusing to salute the American flag. When he was out of the stockade and working he spent most of his time trying to organize his fellow soldiers. Contrary to virtually all published accounts, Everest never served in France and was never sent overseas. After serving during World War I, Everest worked in Centralia, Washington as a lumberjack. He also was a member of the Industrial Workers of the World.

== Centralia Affair ==
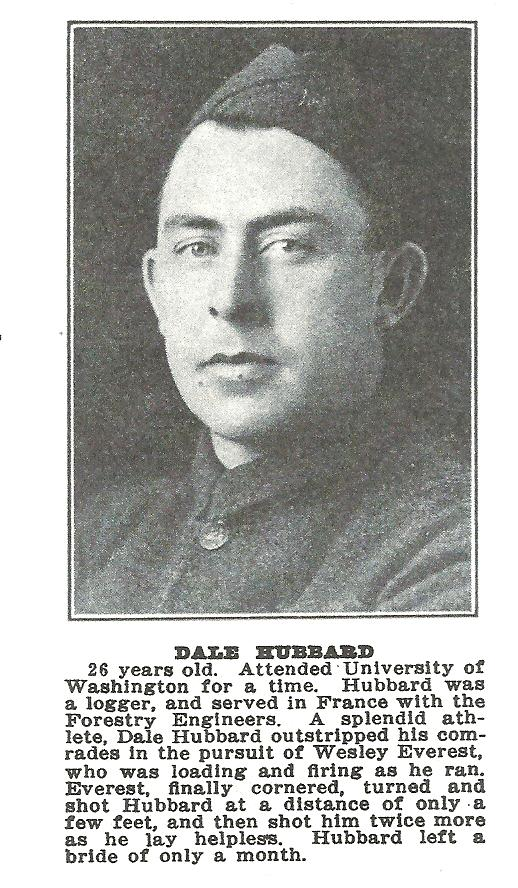
Dale Hubbard

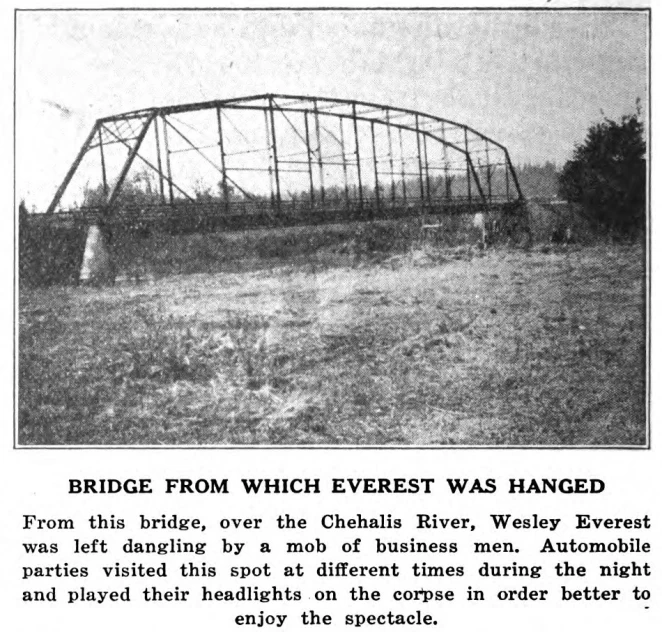
Mellen Street Bridge Centralia Washington

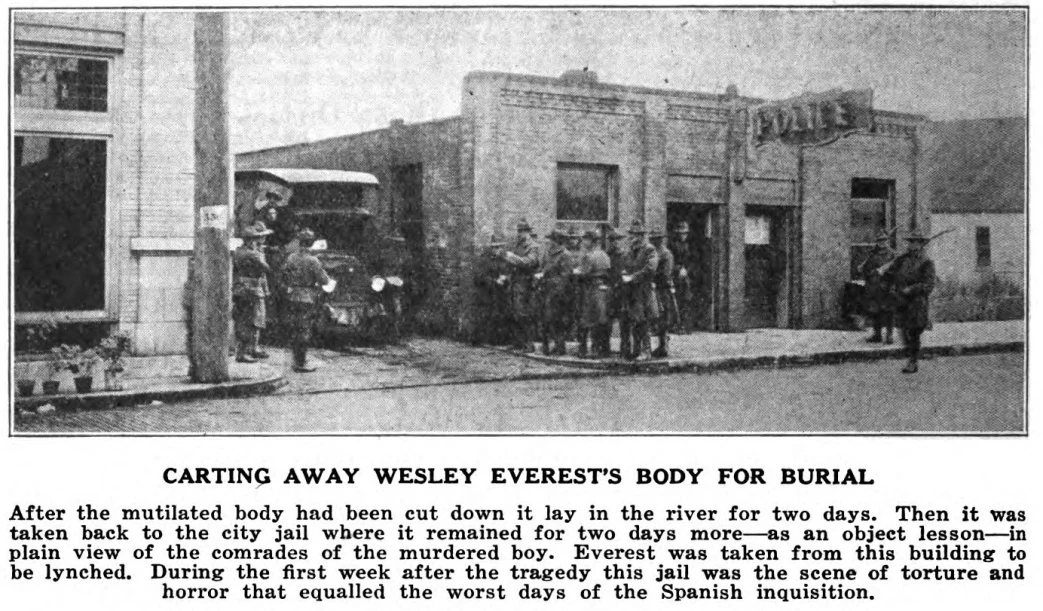
Everest Body taken from the Jail centralia Washington

During the celebration of Armistice Day in 1919, members of the American Legion stormed the IWW Union Hall, although it is debated who initiated the incident. The American Legion claimed that they were fired upon before they attacked the hall. The IWW claimed that the Legion attacked before they fired. The result was a fight that resulted in the deaths of six men, while others were wounded. One participant in the parade, John Earl Watts, was shot and wounded in the side by Everest and fell within a few feet of the mortally wounded Ben Cassagranda. Ironically. Watts was not a member of the American Legion but an IWW member. He had been invited to join the parade because he had served in the U.S. Army Everest escaped out the rear of the Roderick Hotel, firing at his pursuers and reloading as he ran. Legionnaire Alva Coleman grabbed a non-functioning revolver from a captured Wobbly or a nearby house and began to chase Everest. Shot and wounded by Everest, he passed the revolver to Legionnaire Dale Hubbard, a noted athlete, who caught up with Everest as the Wobbly was trying to ford the Skookumchuck River. Pointing the useless revolver at Everest, Hubbard ordered Everest to drop his gun and surrender. It is not known whether Hubbard knew his revolver was useless. Everest most certainly would have assumed it was not. Everest, unable to cross the river, turned and shot Hubbard before he was overpowered, beaten, and dragged to the town's jail. It was said that during the incident, Everest uttered, "I fought for democracy in France and I'm going to fight for it here. The first man that comes in this hall, why, he's going to get it."

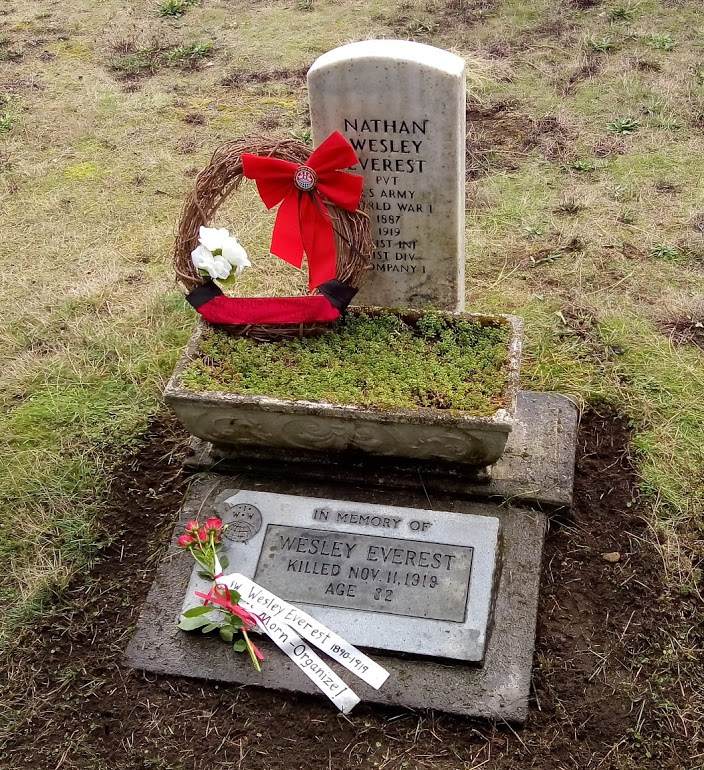
Grave of Wesley Everest, 2017, listed on the National Register of Historic Places.

During the evening of November 11, Everest was turned over to the lynch mob by jail guards, taken to a bridge over the Chehalis River, lynched and then shot. The next day his body was cut down and lay in the river bottom until sunset when his body was returned to the jail. There it lay with the rope still around his neck, in full view of the IWW members rounded up after the shootings. Later his body was buried in a pauper's graveyard in Centralia and the burial plot, the Wesley Everest Gravesite, was officially added to the National Register of Historic Places in 1991.

No one was charged with the crime even if those involved in the lynching were well known to townsfolk in Centralia. As a result of the shootings, seven IWW members were sentenced to prison terms of 25 to 40 years. The last prisoner was released in 1939.

== Castration controversy ==
Many books about the Centralia case state that Everest was castrated while being driven to his lynching. The first published account of castration appeared four months later in Ralph Chaplin's sensational publication, The Centralia Conspiracy. The IWW members who saw Everest's body in the jail after the lynching said nothing about mutilation in interviews with the press at the time. The coroner's jury, who met on November 13 without County Coroner Dr. David Livingstone, was likewise silent. The IWW defense lawyers said nothing about castration during the three-month trial. Those who placed his body in the coffin said nothing about castration at the time. A 1930 account of the Centralia case, published by the Council of Churches, concluded that the castration story "has not been clearly established."

After Everest's body was returned to the jail following his lynching, a man, presumably a police officer, examined his body and filed a police report dated November 12. The report includes a set of fingerprints and a description of the body, including the color of his eyes and hair. It estimates Everest's height and weight. Then, it notes: "No scars that could be located on the body outside where rope cut neck[.] hole that looked like bullet hole[.] Prints taken in the Jail at Centralia, Wash. room very dark to see any thing on the body in line [of] scars: rope was still around the neck of the man." There were no further injuries reported.

John Dos Passos treated the castration as a proven fact in his account of Wesley Everest's life and death included in his U.S.A. trilogy, which reflects the author's sympathy at the time of writing for the IWW and his outrage at its suppression.

== See also ==
- First Red Scare
- Murder of workers in labor disputes in the United States
- Frank Little (unionist)
- Joe Hill (October 7, 1879 – November 19, 1915) was a Swedish-American labor activist, songwriter, and member of the Industrial Workers of the World (IWW, familiarly called the "Wobblies") who was executed on November 19, 1915.

== Archives ==
- American Civil Liberties Union of Washington Records, circa 1942-1996 136.66 cubic feet (including 13 microfilm reels and 1 videocassette) plus 62 cartons and 2 rolled posters.
- American Legion, Department of Washington Records, 1919-1920 .5 linear feet (4 microfilm reels : positive; 4 microfilm reels : negative).
- E. Raymond Attebery Papers, 1913-1979 1.55 cubic ft.
- Rayfield Becker Papers, 1919-1939 .28 cubic foot.
- Industrial Workers of the World, Seattle Joint Branches Records, 1905-1950 3.31 cubic feet.
- Eugene Barnett Oral History Collection 1940-1961. .21 cubic feet (1 box).
