= McConachie =

McConachie may refer to:

- Alexander McConachie (1840–1913), British businessman
- Grant McConachie (1909–1965), Canadian bush pilot and businessman
- Robert McConachie, British footballer
- McConachie, Edmonton, a neighbourhood in Edmonton, Alberta, Canada

== See also ==
- Clark McConachy (1895–1980), New Zealand billiards player
- McConaghy
- McConaughy
