= Winged Victory (Lewis) =

World War I memorial and sculpture in Olympia, Washington, U.S.

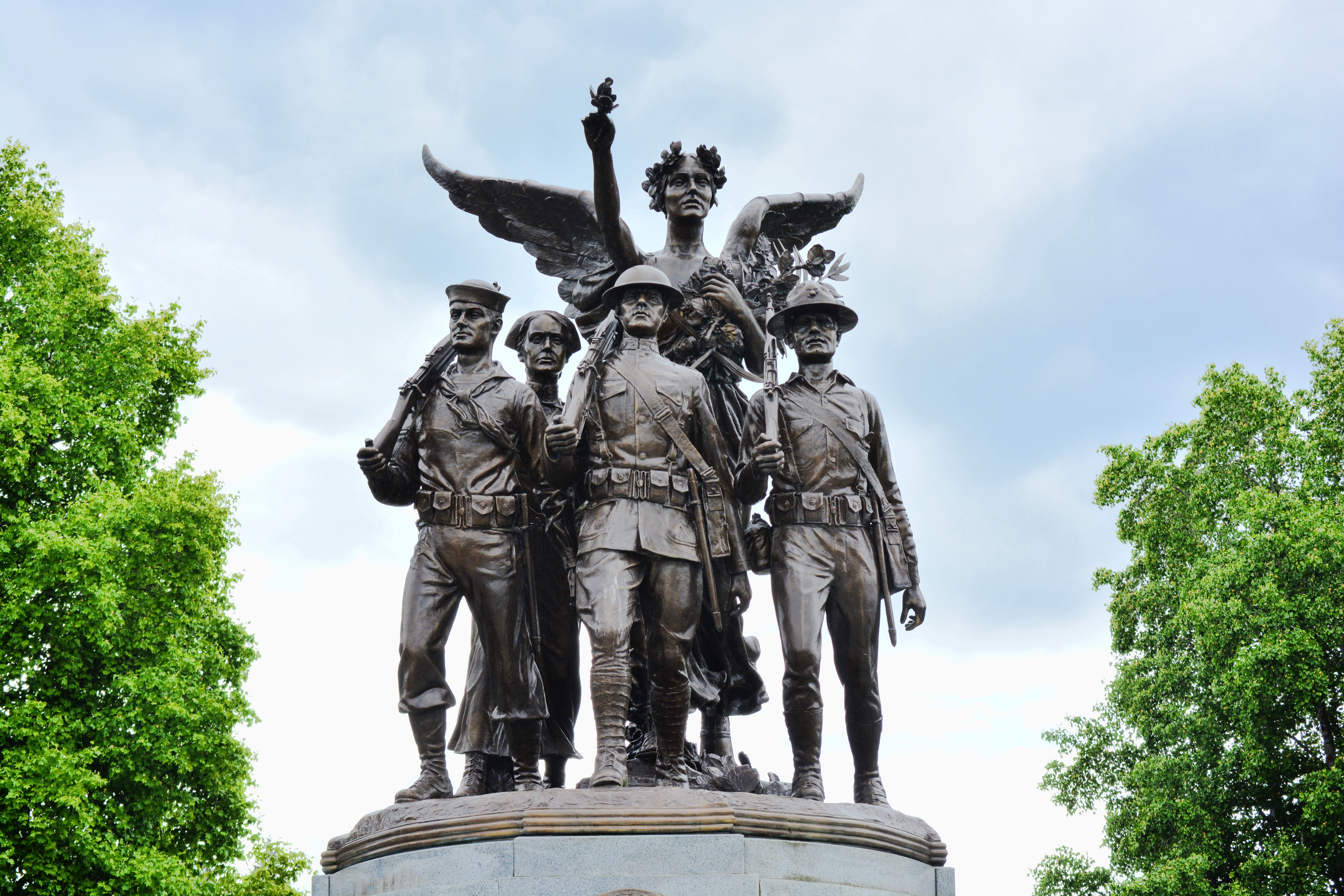
- Winged Victory pictured in 2020
- Interactive map of Memorial location
- Location: Olympia, Washington, U.S.
- Coordinates: 47.036450°N 122.903299°W
- Designer: Alonzo Victor Lewis
- Type: Statue
- Material: Bronze sculptures; granite base
- Height: 22 foot (6.7 m) (from base to tallest figure)
- Completion date: 1938
- Restored date: 2012
- Dedicated to: World War I casualties from Washington state
- Website: Official page at the Washington Department of Enterprise Services

Winged Victory is a World War I memorial in the U.S. state of Washington, which consists of four figures of uniformed persons atop a granite pedestal eclipsed by a fifth figure depicting the Winged Victory of Samothrace.

Winged Victory is located in front of the Insurance Building and adjacent to the Washington State Capitol in Olympia, Washington. Completed in 1938 by Alonzo Victor Lewis, it is dedicated to military personnel from Washington who died in World War I and is notable for its inclusion of a Red Cross nurse in the group of figures depicted.

== History ==
Winged Victory pictured in 1938

=== Background ===
In March 1917, anticipating the United States declaration of war on Germany that would come the following month, Governor of Washington Ernest Lister ordered the mobilization of the Washington National Guard, whose units had only recently returned from service in California during the Mexican border emergency. On August 5 of that year the 2nd Washington Infantry Regiment was pressed into federal service, later joined by the 146th Field Artillery. During the year-and-a-half in which the U.S. was engaged in hostilities, a total of 60,617 Washington men served in deployed National Guard units, or in the United States Army, United States Navy, United States Marine Corps, or United States Coast Guard. During the conflict 1,642 were killed or died of disease.

=== Funding and construction ===
In 1919, following the conclusion of hostilities, Lister called for the erection of a monument to the citizens of Washington who were killed during the war. The Washington State Legislature subsequently appropriated $50,000 for its design and construction, with funds partly raised through the sale of a state forest. The balance of the $100,000 cost of the monument was provided in grants from the United States government.

Seattle artist Alonzo Victor Lewis, who already had a popular reputation in the state, was commissioned for the sculpture. His plans for it were approved in 1927 and the statue was completed in 1938. It was formally dedicated in a ceremony held on May 30, 1938, and it was unveiled by the mothers of two Washington soldiers who had been killed in action. Stephen Chadwick, then chairman of the American Legion's Americanism Committee and later National Commander of the American Legion delivered the ceremonial charge.

=== Later history ===
Following the completion of Winged Victory, which was Alonzo Victor Lewis' third World War I memorial statue, he was named the state's Sculptor Laureate.

The statue was sandblasted in 1979 to remove staining on its surface. In 1988, the sculpture was painted with a coating of brass powder in an acrylic base, giving it a golden hue. This layer was removed in 2012 and the statue was restored to its original bronze color. Centennial observances of the end of World War I were held at the Winged Victory memorial in 2017, which were keynoted by Lorraine McConaghy.

Winged Victory has been called "one of the most recognizable structures" on the campus of the Washington State Capitol.

== Design ==
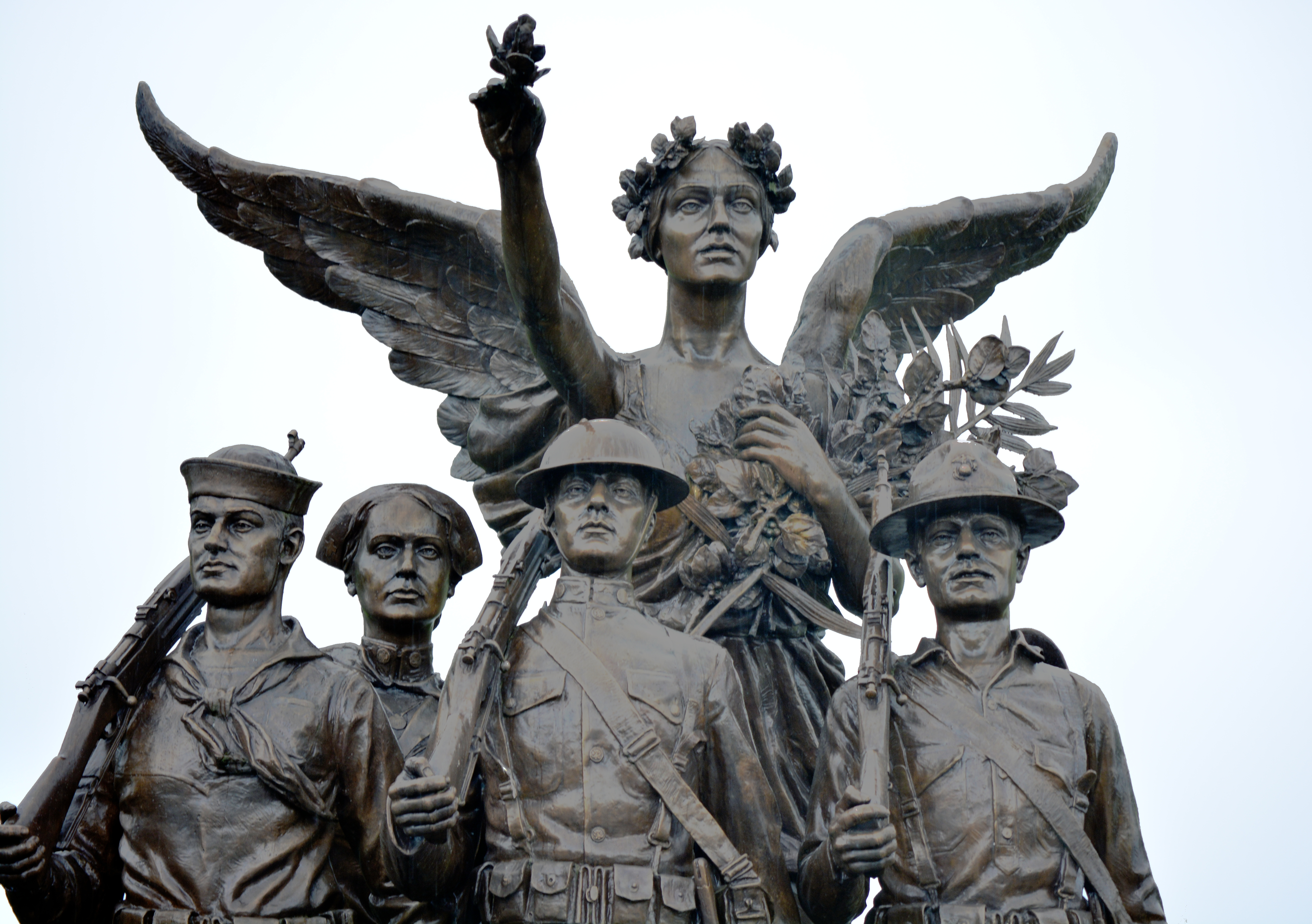
Detail view, 2020

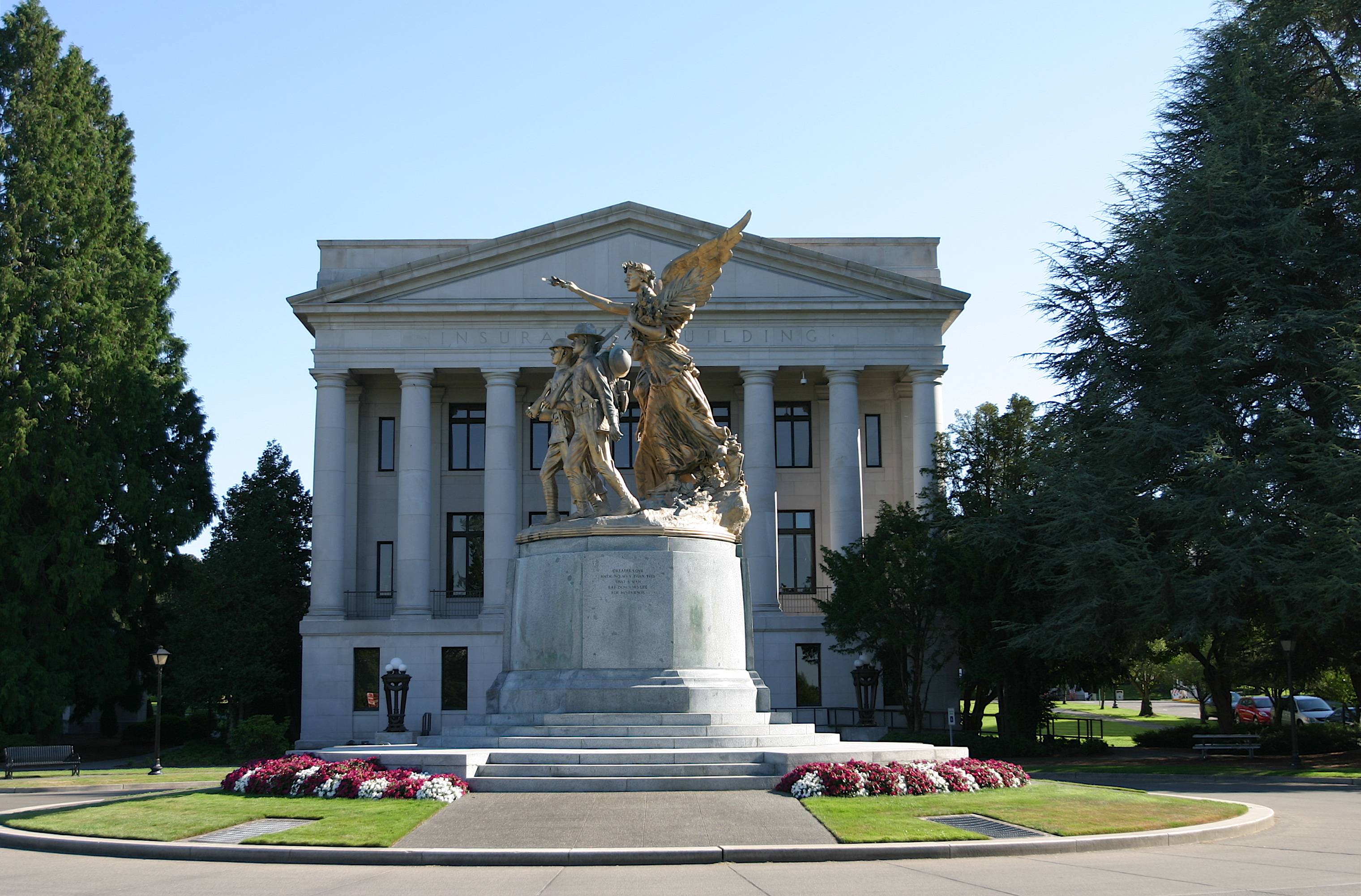
A side view of Winged Victory pictured in 2006, a period during which the statue was painted in a golden hue.

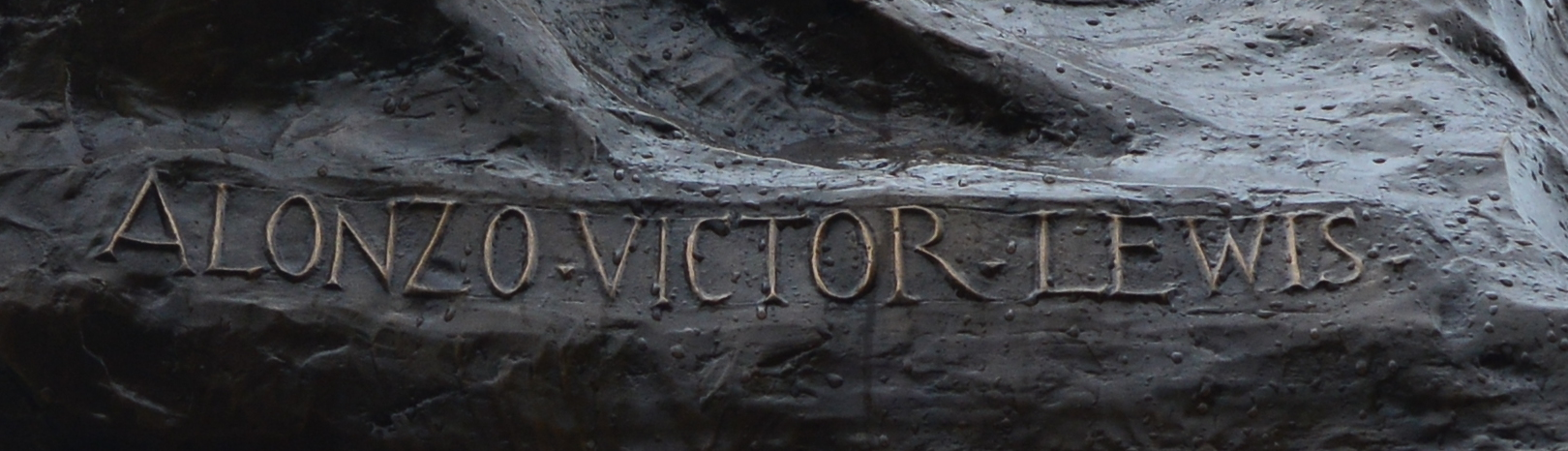
Alonzo Victor Lewis's name is prominently visible at the rear of the statue near its base.

The bronze statue is elevated on a granite base; it features a Winged Victory from Classical mythology standing, with wings displayed, behind a United States soldier, a sailor, a Marine, and an American Red Cross nurse, all of whom appear to be marching towards the east. The Winged Victory motif was a popular theme for World War I monuments of the era, though the inclusion of a Red Cross nurse makes the Olympia statue more complex than most. Each of the four sides of the statue's granite base is inscribed. On the east side, which is inlaid with a bronze representation of the Seal of the State of Washington, the inscription reads:

TO THE MEMORY OF THE CITIZENS OF THE STATE OF WASHINGTON WHO LOST THEIR LIVES IN THE SERVICE OF THE UNITED STATES DURING THE WORLD WAR 1917–1918

On the north side is a Biblical quotation from John 15, verse 13:

GREATER LOVE HATH NO MAN THAN THIS, THAT A MAN LAY DOWN HIS LIFE FOR HIS FRIEND

On the west side:

THEIR SACRIFICE WAS TO VINDICATE THE PRINCIPLES OF PEACE AND JUSTICE IN THE LIFE OF THE WORLD

On the south side:

THEY FOUGHT TO SAFEGUARD AND TRANSMIT TO POSTERITY THE PRINCIPLES OF JUSTICE, FREEDOM, AND DEMOCRACY

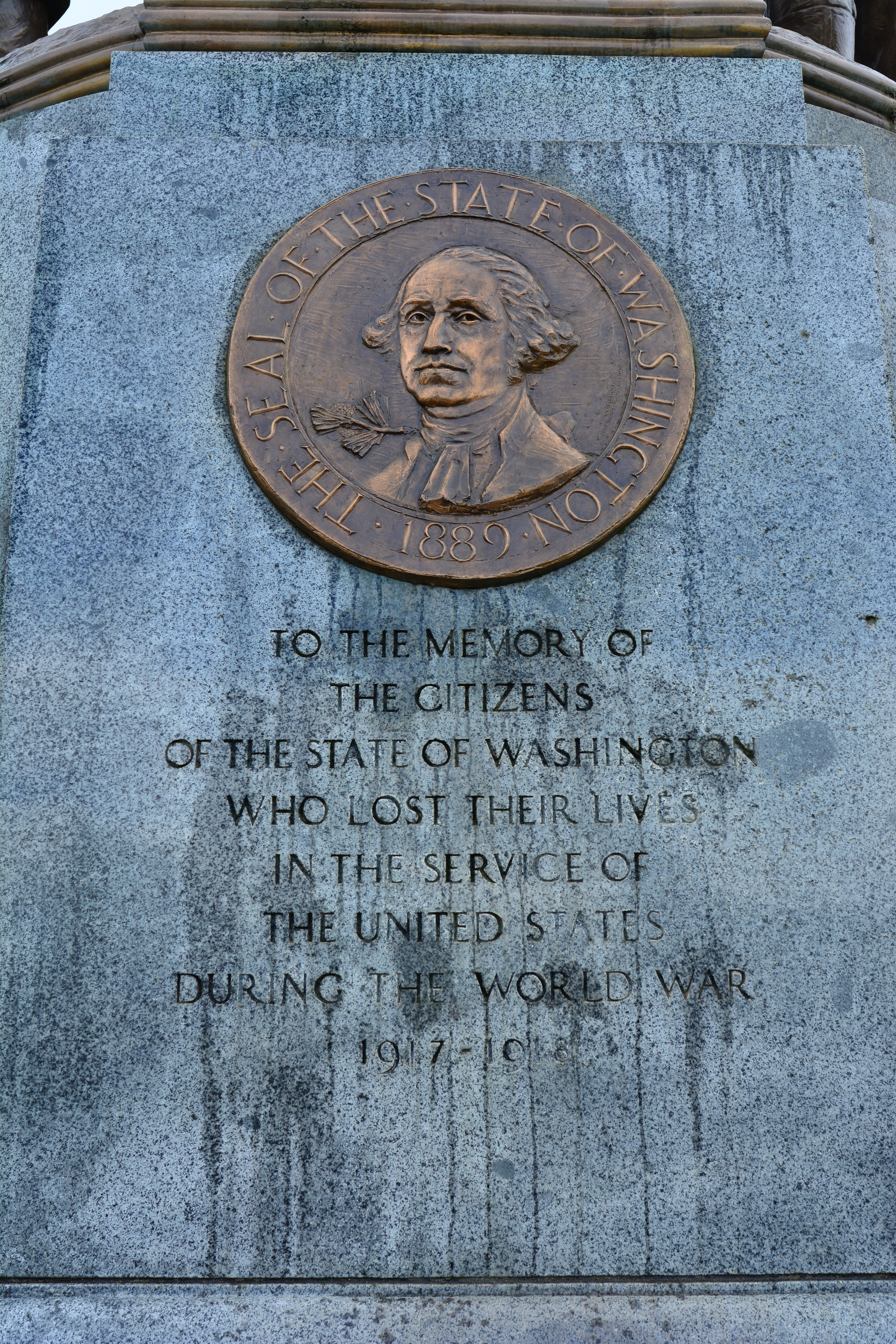
TO THE MEMORY OF THE CITIZENS…

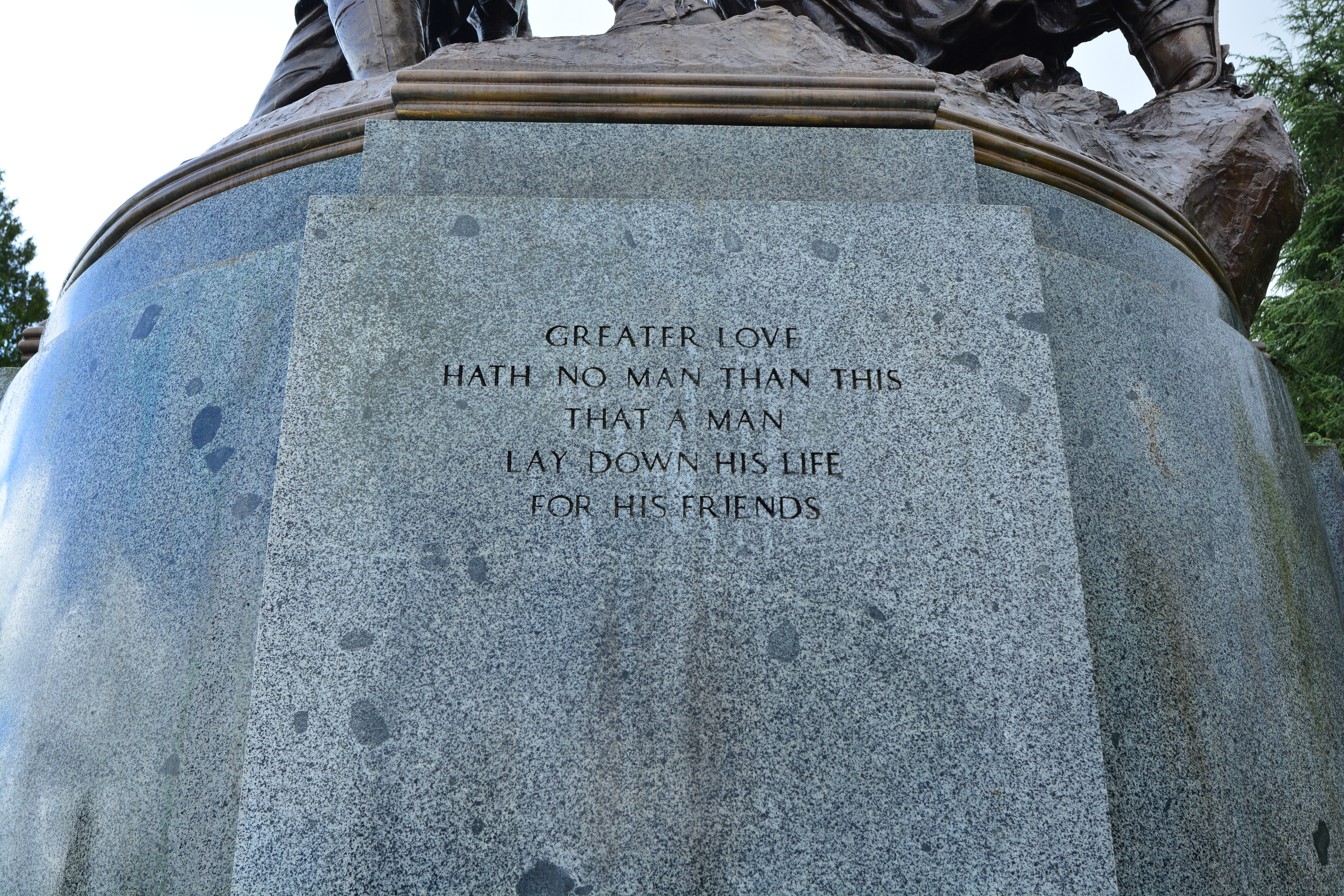
GREATER LOVE HATH NO MAN…

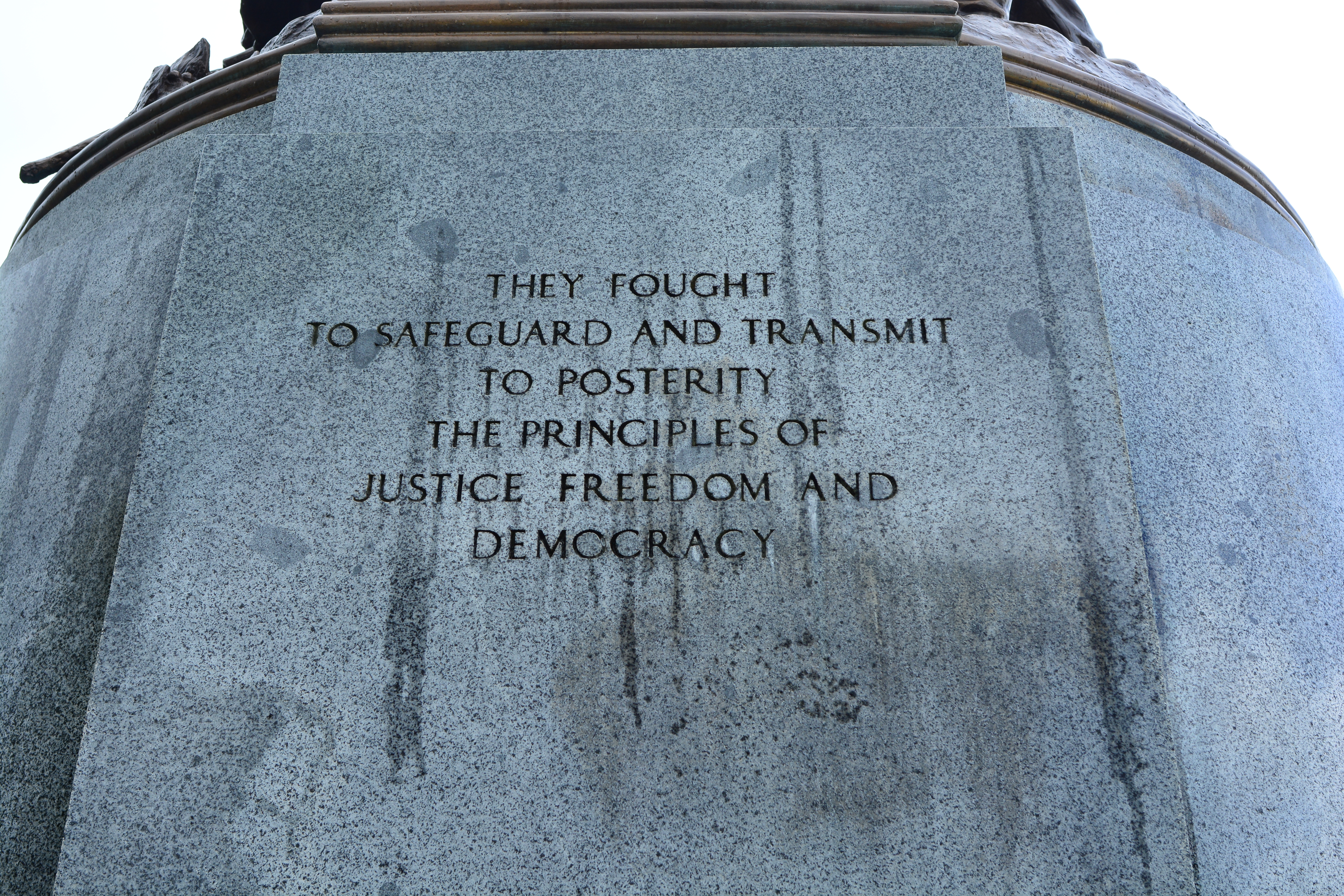
THEIR SACRIFICE WAS TO VINDICATE…

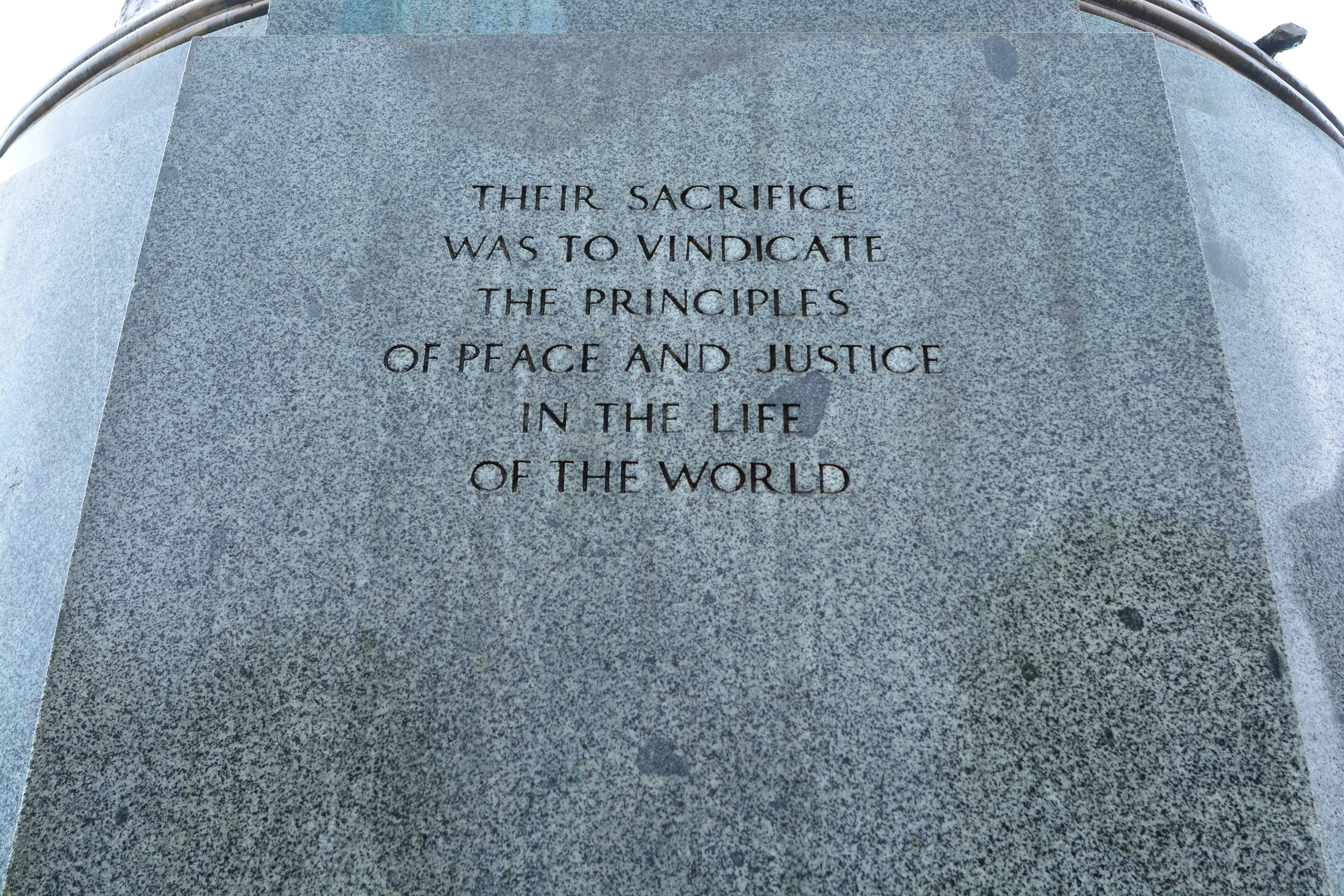
THEY FOUGHT TO SAFEGUARD…

== See also ==
- American Doughboy Bringing Home Victory (1932), another World War I monument by Alonzo Victor Lewis
- National World War I Museum and Memorial (Indianapolis, Indiana)
- National World War I Memorial (Washington, D.C.)
