= Insurance (disambiguation) =

Insurance is a means of protection from financial loss.

Insurance may also refer to:

- Insurance (constituency), a functional constituency in the Legislative Council of Hong Kong
- Insurance (football club), Ethiopian football club
- Insurance, a betting option in Blackjack
- Insurance Building (Olympia, Washington), a government building in Olympia, Washington
