= McConnaughay =

McConnaughay is a surname. Notable people with the surname include:

- Karen McConnaughay (born 1957), American politician
- Philip McConnaughay (born 1953), American academic administrator and jurist

== See also ==
- McConnaughey
- Matthew McConaughey (born 1969), American actor, director, producer and writer
- McConaughy
