= McConnaughey =

McConnaughey is a surname. Notable people with the surname include:

- George McConnaughey (c. 1897–1966), chairman of the Federal Communications Commission
- Ralph McConnaughey (1889–1966), American baseball player

== See also ==
- Matthew McConaughey (born 1969), American actor, director, producer and writer
- McConnaughay
- McConaughy
