= McConaghy =

McConaghy is a surname. Notable people with the surname include:

- Brian McConaghy (born 1950), Canadian forensic scientist
- Charlotte McConaghy, Australian novelist and screenwriter
- Jack McConaghy (1902–1977), American set decorator
- Lorraine McConaghy (21st century), American historian
- Stephen McConaghy (born 1968), Australian sailor
