= American Doughboy Bringing Home Victory =

Sculpture in Seattle, Washington, U.S.

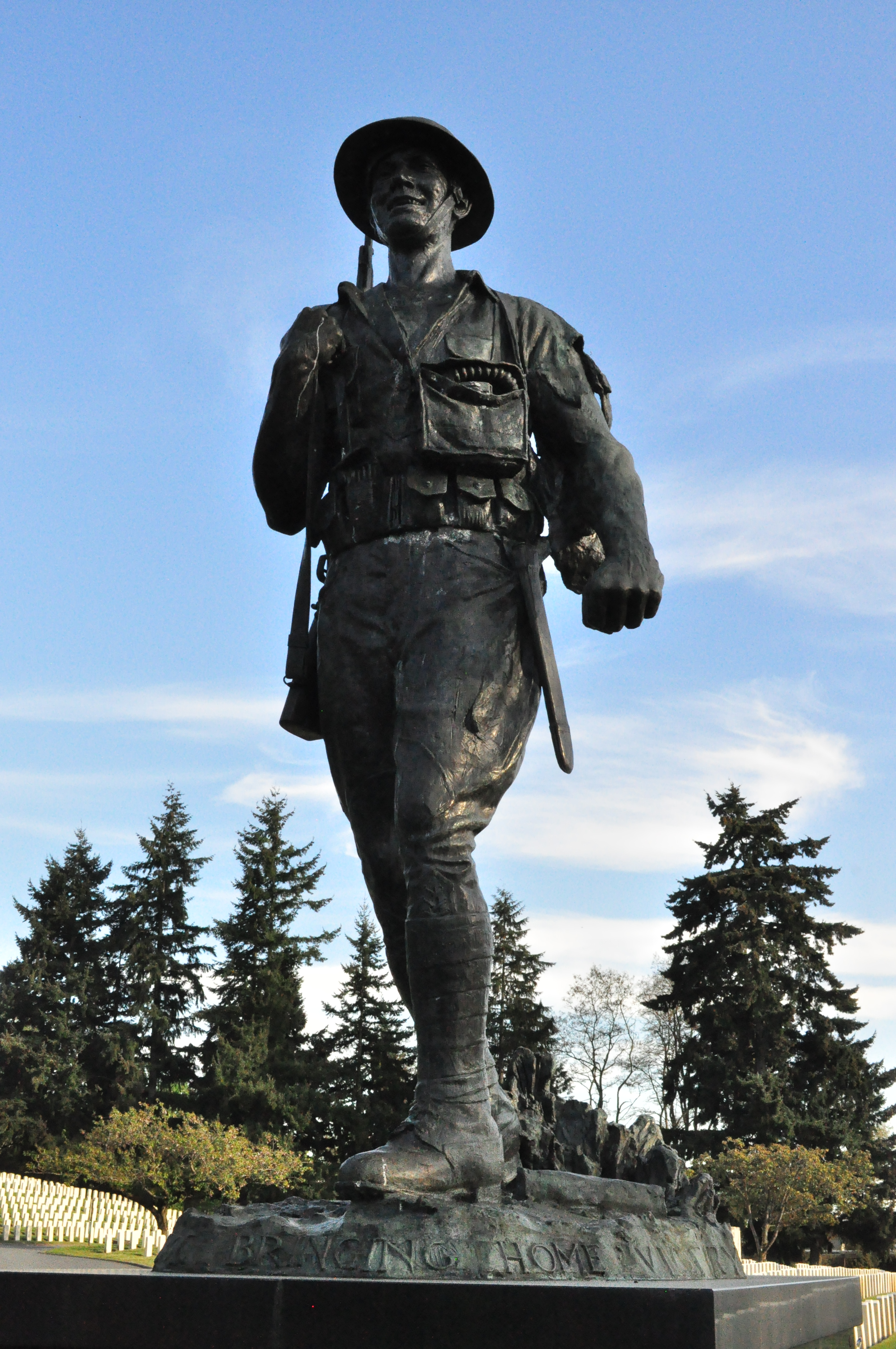
- The memorial at Evergreen Washelli Memorial Park in 2014
- Artist: Alonzo Victor Lewis
- Year: 1932
- Type: Sculpture
- Medium: Bronze
- Dimensions: 12.0 feet (3.7 m)
- Condition: "Treatment urgent" (1994)
- Location: Seattle, Washington, United States; 47.709617°N 122.343001°W

American Doughboy Bringing Home Victory, also known as Armistice and Spirit of the American Doughboy, is an outdoor 1932 bronze sculpture and war memorial by Alonzo Victor Lewis. The statue is 12.0 feet (3.7 m) tall and weighs 4,600 pounds (2,100 kg).

The statue was first installed outside Seattle Center's Veterans Hall, and later relocated to Evergreen Washelli Memorial Park, in the U.S. state of Washington. It was originally commissioned in 1921 in plaster and was called American Doughboy Bringing Home the Bacon. In 1932, funds for a permanent memorial led to the dedication of a bronze cast with "certain changes in appearance from the original".

The sculpture courted local controversy before and after its unveiling, with views held that the facial expression, displayed war souvenirs, and the original name were uncharacteristic of returning soldiers and disrespectful to German-American citizens. By the 1960s, the bayonet on the rifle had been removed and in the preceding years, two German helmets slung over the statue's shoulders had been sawn off. The sculpture was surveyed and deemed "treatment urgent" by the Smithsonian Institution's "Save Outdoor Sculpture!" program in August 1994.

In 1998, the statue was relocated to Evergreen Washelli Memorial Park. One of the missing bronze German helmets was found in approximately 2018 by an operations manager at the cemetery.

== See also ==
- 1932 in art
- The Sentinel (Centralia, Washington statue)
- Winged Victory (Lewis)
