= The Sentinel (Centralia, Washington statue) =

National Register of Historic Places statue in Centralia, Washington

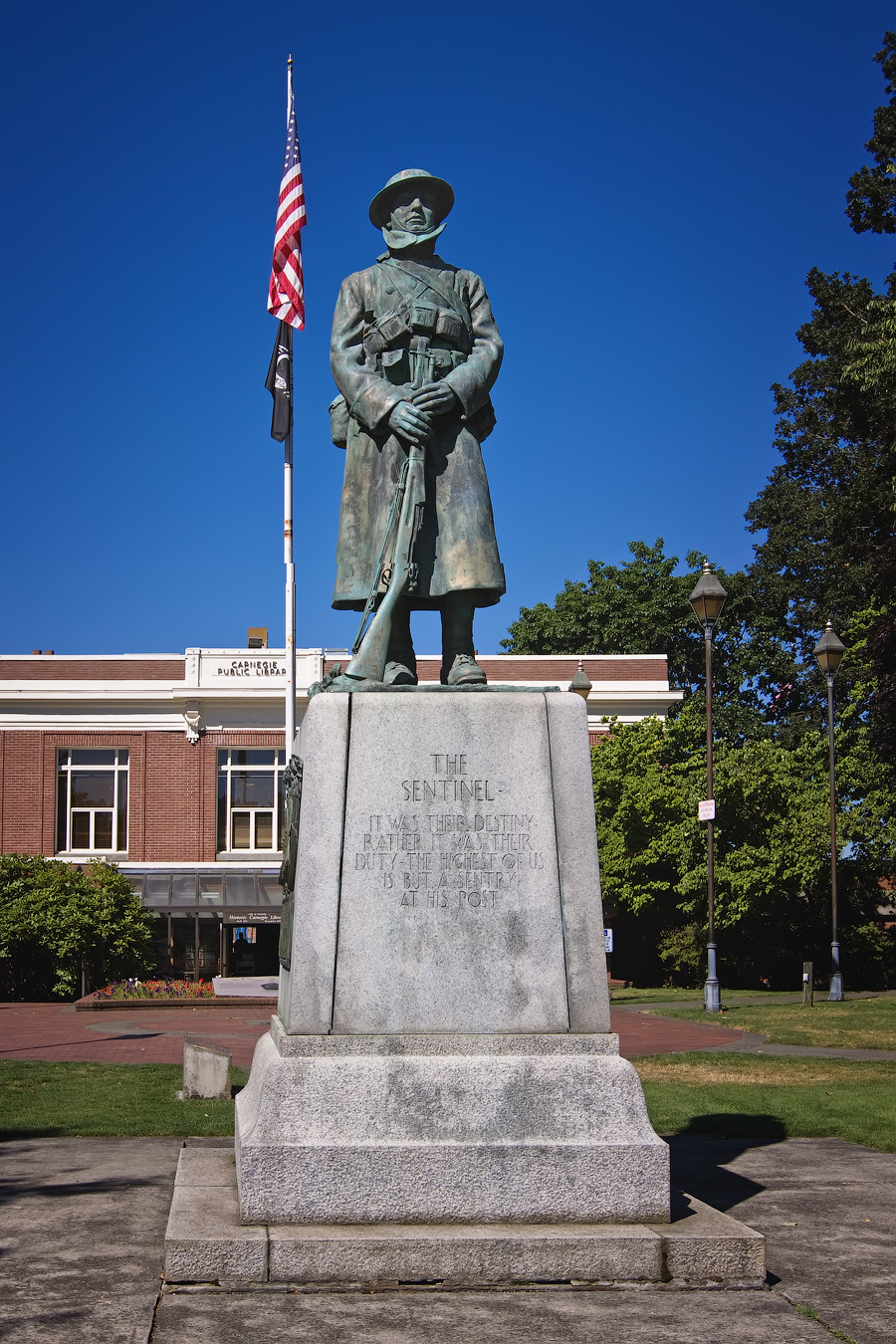
- Artist: Alonzo Victor Lewis
- Year: 1922
- Completion date: 1924
- Type: Sculpture
- Medium: Bronze
- Subject: In honor of American Legion members who lost their lives during the Centralia Tragedy
- Dimensions: 8.0 feet (2.4 m)
- Condition: Good
- Location: Centralia, Washington, United States
- Website
- The Sentinel
- U.S. National Register of Historic Places
- Washington State Heritage Register
- Location within Washington (state)
- Location: George Washington Park, Centralia, Washington
- Coordinates: 46°42′59″N 122°57′19″W
- Area: 25 square feet (2.3 m^{2})
- Built: 1924
- MPS: Properties Associated with Centralia Armistice Day, 1919
- NRHP reference No.: 91001782

Significant dates
- Added to NRHP: December 17, 1991
- Designated WSHR: August 7, 1987

The Sentinel is a bronze sculpture of an American soldier and is centrally located in George Washington Park in Centralia, Washington. The statue was listed on the National Register of Historic Places in 1991. The artwork is a memorial to the four members of the American Legion who lost their lives during the November 11, 1919 Armistice Day Riot, also known as the Centralia Massacre and the Centralia Tragedy.

Created by Seattle-based artist Alonzo Victor Lewis on behest of the local Centralia citizens and the American Legion, the bronze sculpture was completed and dedicated in 1924. The ceremony was attended by several dignitaries and a crowd was estimated as approximately 10,000 people; prominent national and international figures sent messages of appreciation.

Though the artwork is both a sense of pride and divisiveness due to the nature of the violence and differing historical accounts of the Centralia Tragedy, the Sentinel is considered to be in good condition, requiring only one notable restoration effort in 2023. The piece is often graffitied, requiring occasional cleaning to remove the vandalization.

The Sentinel shares space with several other memorials in George Washington Park, including the Freedom Walk War Memorial, honoring Lewis County veterans who were killed in wars and military engagements since World War I. Another monument includes the historical perspective of the Industrial Workers of the World in the tragedy. Additionally, a variety of works noting various historical events or notable people surround the statue, such as plaques for the city's founder, George Washington, a Bill Clinton 1996 presidential campaign stop in the city, and a September 11, 2001 memorial.

== Background ==
The Sentinel was born out of the events of the Armistice Day Riot on November 11, 1919, in Centralia, Washington. The statue is a memorial to four slain members of the American Legion.

Due to the differing versions of events of that day, the Sentinel monument has been both a point of pride and divisiveness since its dedication in 1924.

== History ==
Centralia citizens of prominence began discussing the need of a memorial to honor the American Legion members who were killed during the Armistice Day Riots, also known as the Centralia Massacre or Centralia Tragedy, after the Industrial Workers of the World (IWW) trial in 1920. The American Legion, at a national convention, endorsed the idea and by 1922 a local organization known as the Centralia Memorial Association (CMA) was formed to raise funds for a grand memorial. Despite a goal of $250,000, and being led by the state's lieutenant governor and a Seattle publisher, the state-wide funding campaign raised only a committed $16,000. Legal troubles and resignations plagued further attempts, and most American Legion posts resisted supporting the efforts. Viewpoints among citizens, beginning to side with the Wobblies, (Note: "Wobbly" or "Wobblies" are non-pejorative nicknames for members of the Industrial Workers of the World (IWW). The origin of the moniker remains uncertain.) also hampered the monetary efforts.

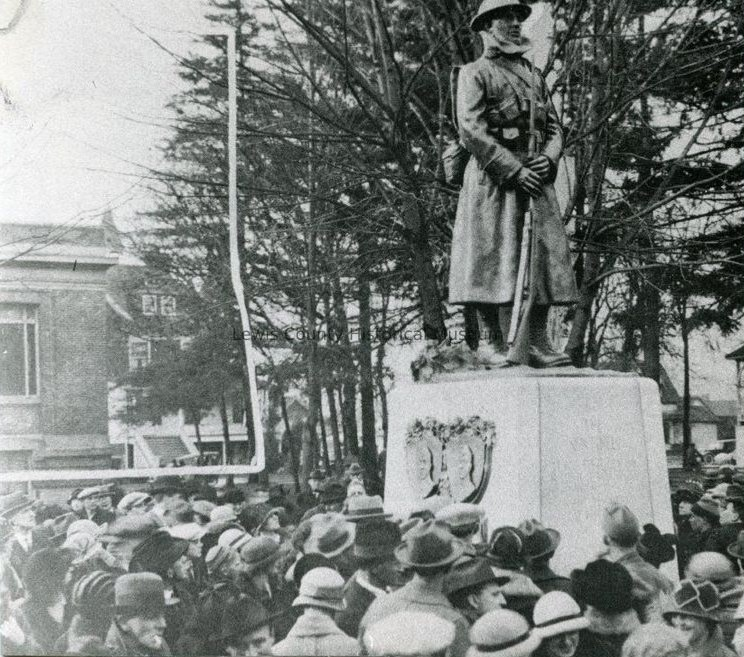
Dedication ceremony, 1924

Due to the limited funds, the CMA reconfigured the memorial plans and in 1922 hired Alonzo Victor Lewis, a Seattle sculptor noted later for his work, American Doughboy Bringing Home Victory. Lewis worked on the statue for two years, originally planning on the statue to be 9.5 feet (2.9 m) tall but most of the elements seen on the completed work remained unchanged from his original drafts. Lewis requested veterans to pose as a model for the statue, mentioning that he wanted a man "who would best typify the fighters sent to Europe from the Pacific Northwest". The original title of the piece was On Guard Duty.

The dedication was held on Armistice Day, November 11, 1924, the day considered to be a deliberate act by the American Legion, and was attended by as many as 10,000 people. Described as full of "pomp and symbolism", further reports mention that the ceremonies went beyond the memorialization of the legionnaires. The American Legion held its national convention in Centralia at the time and a parade, marking the exact same route as during the 1919 events, took place without incident even as the parade traveled past a new IWW hall. Major General Ulysses Grant McAlexander, known as the "Rock of the Marne", delivered the official memorial address. Several dignitaries spoke, including Lewis and state governor Louis F. Hart, and messages were sent from international figures, such as French Marshall Ferdinand Foch. A telegram was sent by President Calvin Coolidge in recognition of the dedication.

When on Armistice Day you unveil in memory of the four veterans of the World War who were murdered on Armistice Day 1919, I wish to be among those who will join the expression of profound sorrow for the loss of those heroic lives and of gratitude that their memory is thus to be perpetuated.

— Calvin Coolidge

=== Post-dedication ===
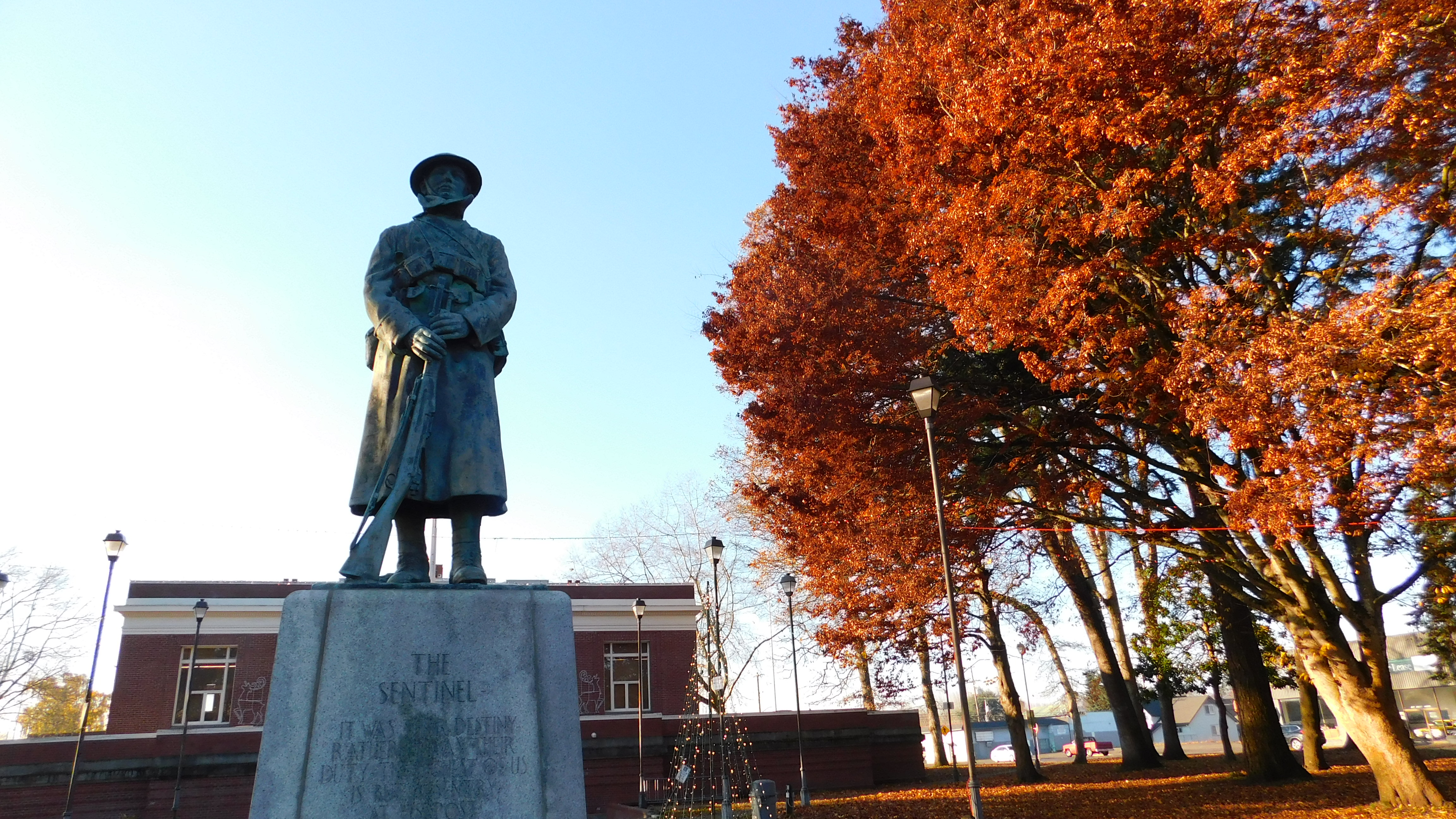
The Sentinel, 2023

After the 1980 Mt. St. Helens eruption, with ash falling on Centralia, an unknown person placed a face mask over the soldier.

A small American Legion ceremony, honoring all members of all branches of the United States military, was held at George Washington Park in front of the Sentinel on Veterans Day, November 11, 2019. The 100th anniversary of the tragedy was acknowledged, with a retired colonel remarking in a speech that it was "important that we not let the Armistice Day Tragedy define our veterans who we honor today".

=== Restorations ===
The statue is often defaced with graffiti but routine maintenance removes any alterations.

A restoration effort on The Sentinel was begun and completed in May 2023. Led by a volunteer effort of a local bricklayers union, the project focused on preserving the statue's base, which had suffered long-term water damage, slowly cracking the granite foundation. New mortar and support pins were added.

== Description ==
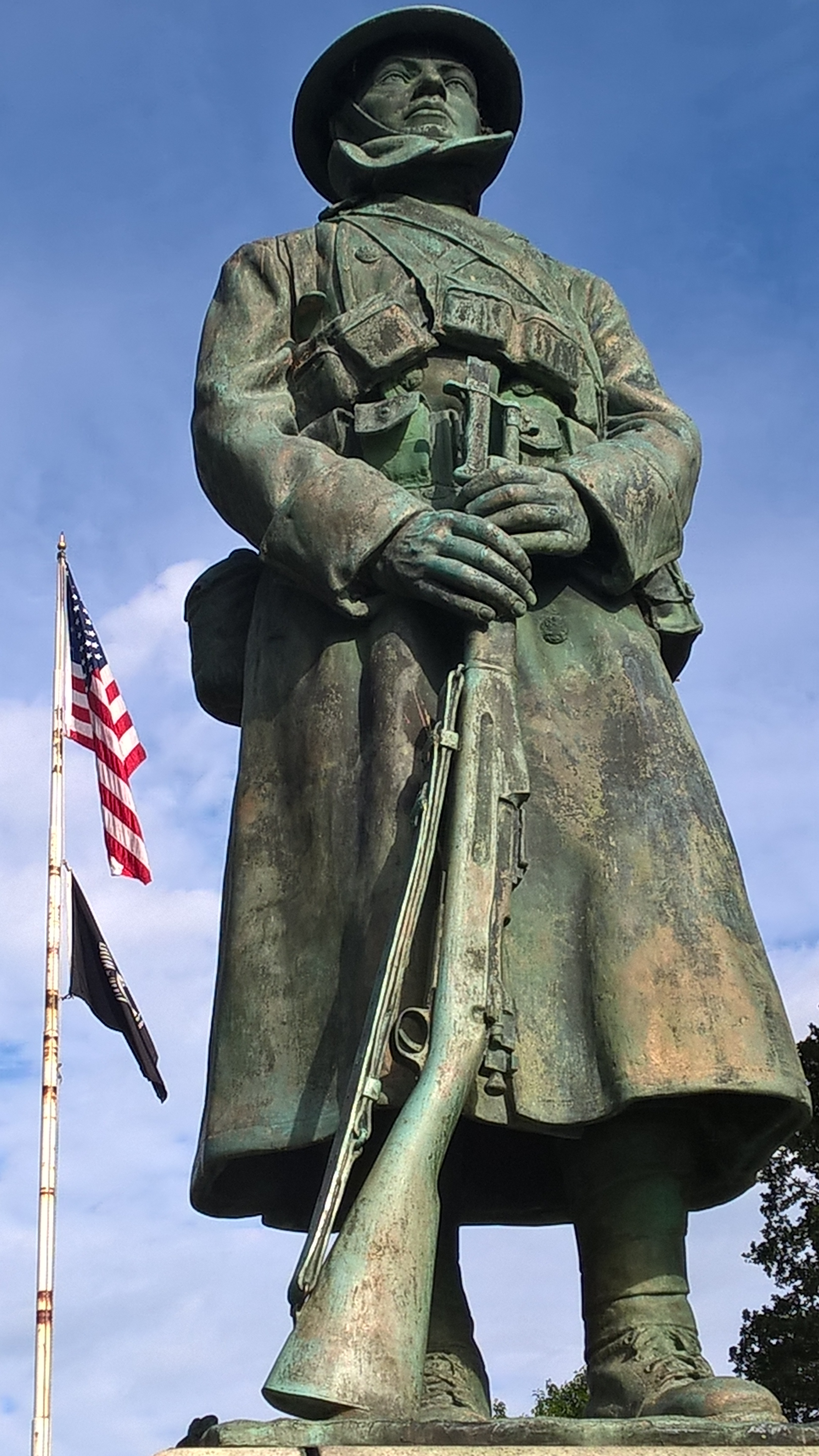
The Sentinel, detail

The Sentinel is an 8 foot (2.4 metres) (Note: The Sentinel statue, according to the NRHP form, is listed as 8 feet (2.4 m) tall, however differing measurements of up to 10 feet (3.0 m) are used in other sources.) tall cast bronze sculpture of a World War I doughboy atop a granite base. Unmodified since its placement in 1924, the artwork faces east. Over time, based on a form of transmutation, the statue has been described as taking on the likeness of Wesley Everest, the lynched Wobbly from the riot, but the NRHP form does not confirm the idea.

The Sentinel is comparable to Lewis's Seattle doughboy sculpture in which both infantrymen are depicted with a helmet, rifle, and bandolier. Differences include the Sentinel's bayonet on the rifle which is folded into the gunstock and the position of the rifle, which on the Sentinel stands in front of the soldier, clasped in his hands. Additionally, the Sentinel soldier is wearing a great coat, with the collar of the trench coat turned upwards as if protecting the infantryman from the weather. The most visible difference is the manner and movement of the two artworks. The Seattle doughboy is a smiling soldier, walking in stride as opposed to the Sentinel likeness, which is devoid of movement or a positive manner. The Sentinel is described as either standing at attention or at a position of guard duty. The engraving at the base of the statue mentions the soldier as a "sentry at his post".

The pedestal is four-sided, 8 feet (2.4 m) in height. A panel on the front of the stone base contains a carved inscription:

THE SENTINEL
It was their destiny -
rather it was their
duty - the highest of us
is but a sentry
at his post.

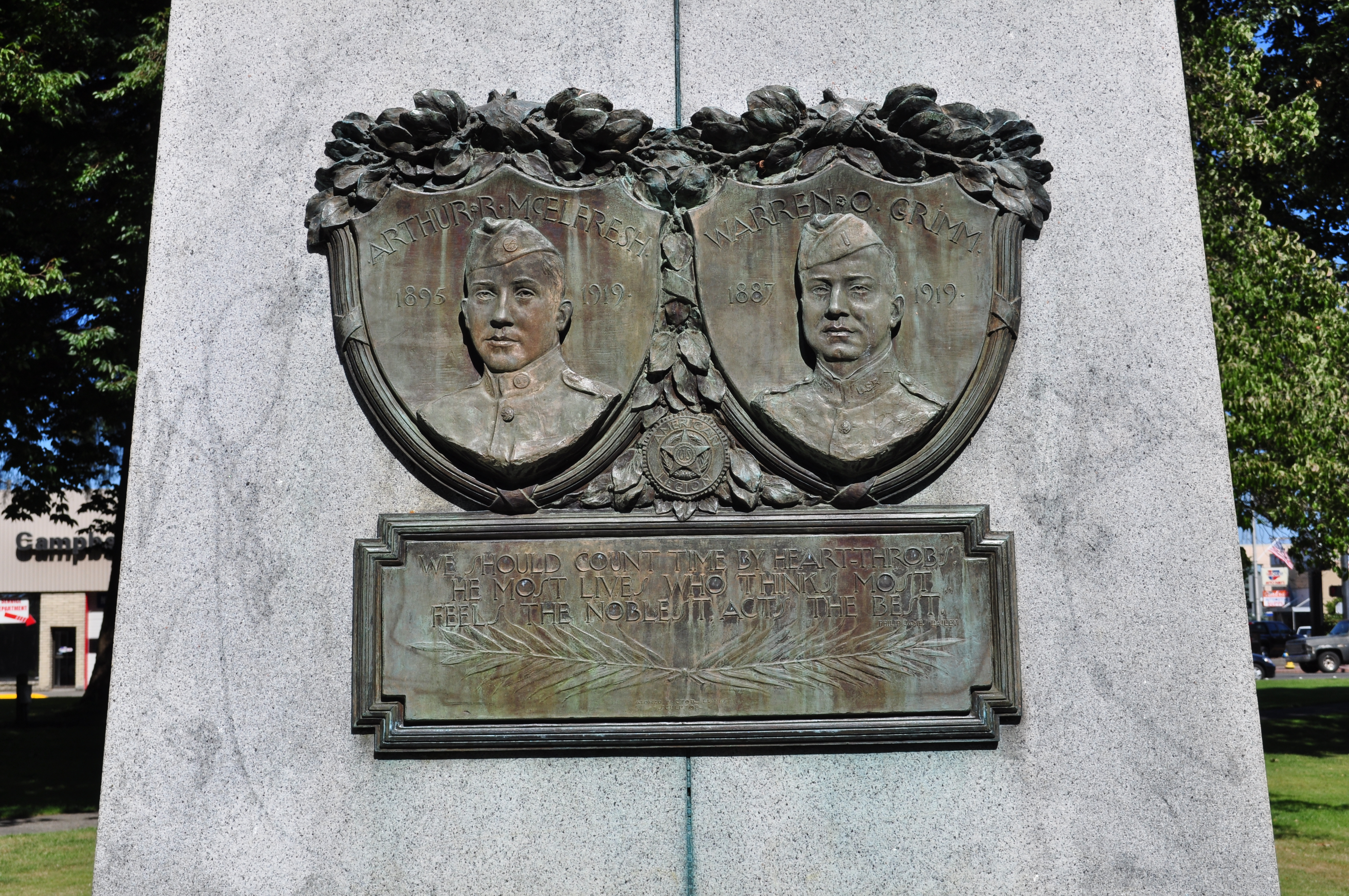
Bas relief, McElfresh and Grimm

On the left flank of the pedestal is a bronze bas relief with an American Legion insignia containing the portraits of Arthur McElfresh and Warren Grimm, two legionnaire members who died during the Armistice Day Riot. A bronze plaque reads:

We should count time by heart-throbs
He most lives who thinks most,
Feels the noblest, acts the best.
- Philip James Bailey

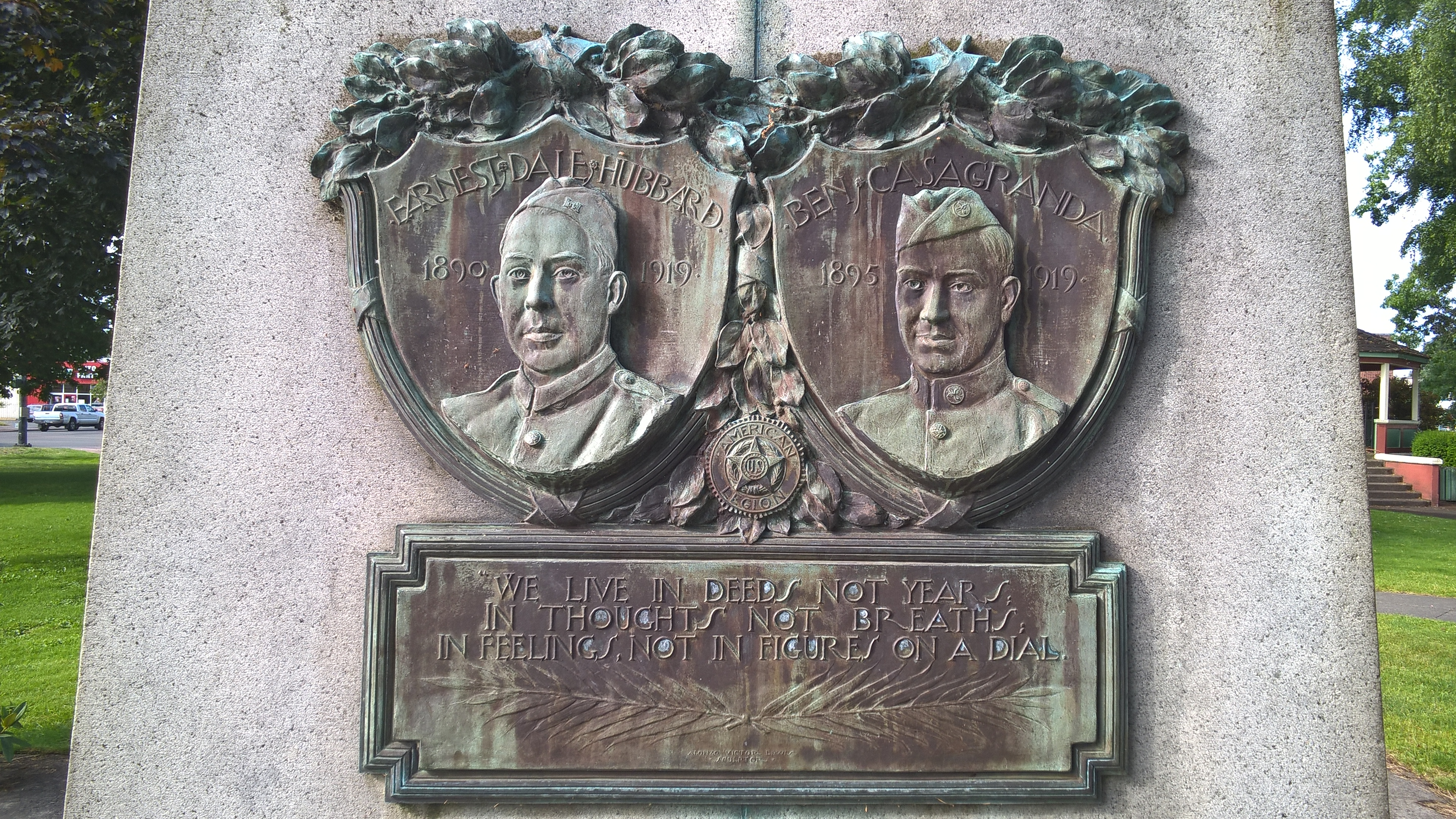
Bas relief, Hubbard and Casagranda

The right side of the pedestal is similar, featuring portraits of fellow legionnaires killed on the day, Earnest Dale Hubbard and Ben Casagranda. A different inscription reads:

We live in deeds not years;
In thoughts not breaths;
In feelings, not in figures on a dial.

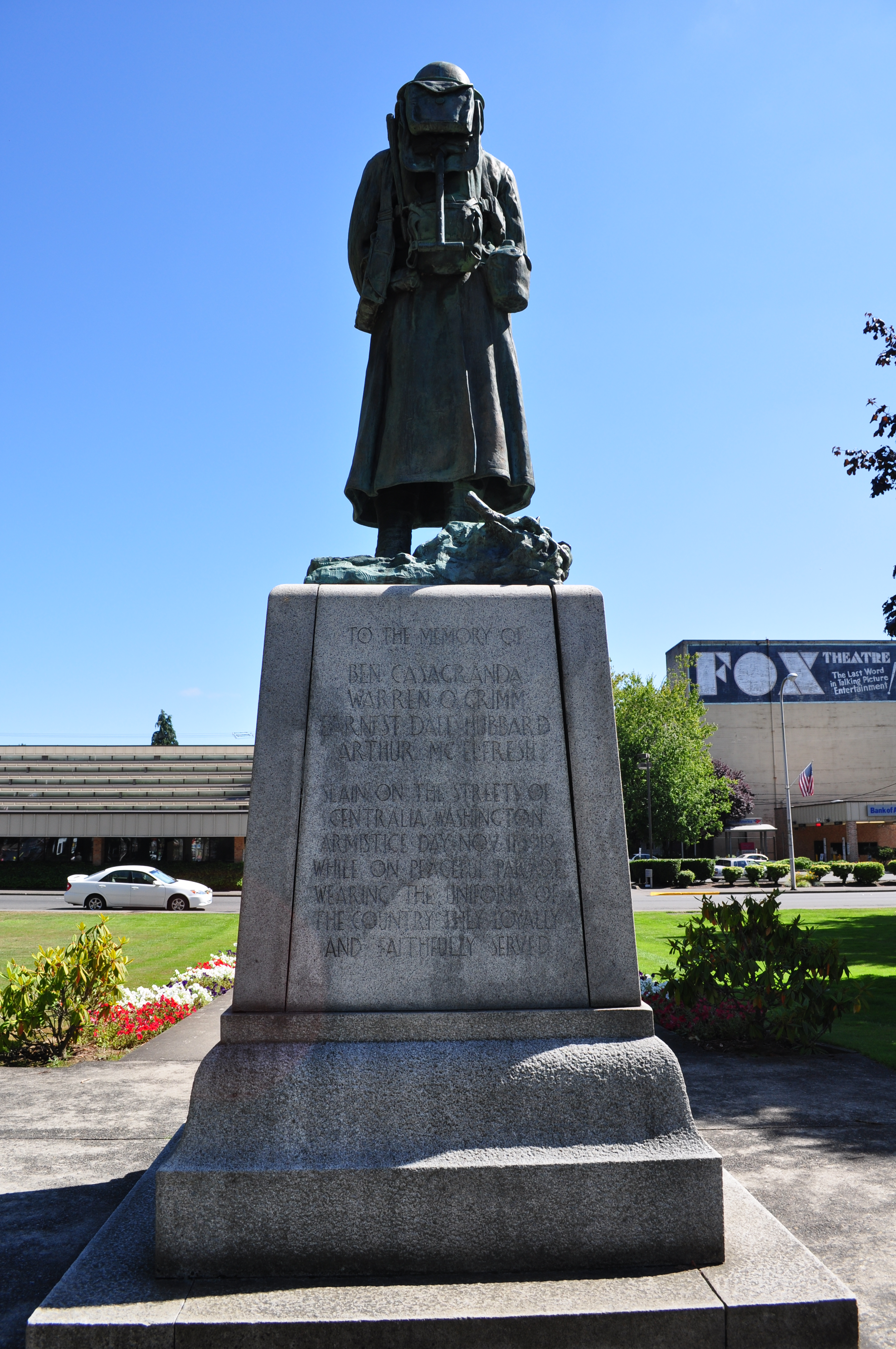
Rear view

At the rear of the statue, the base is carved with an inscription mentioning details of the tragedy and all four legionnaires who died:

To the memory of
Ben Casagranda
Warren O. Grimm
Earnest Dale Hubbard
Arthur McElfresh

Slain on the streets of
Centralia, Washington
Armistice Day Nov. 11, 1919
while on peaceful parade
wearing the uniform of
the country they loyally
and faithfully served.

Despite the memorial depicting a soldier in military uniform of the Great War, the monument does not mention World War I. The NRHP noted that the memorial resembles works seen in post-World War II Eastern Europe and the Soviet Union, seeming to share a "common interest in conscripting the memories of the dead for ideological service in the present." The monument lacks any mention of members of the IWW who were slain during the riot, an intentional omission by the statue's memorial committee due to concerns of future violence directed towards the statue. The inscription "while on peaceful parade" is considered to be contentious due to the differing versions of the tragedy.

== Site and features ==
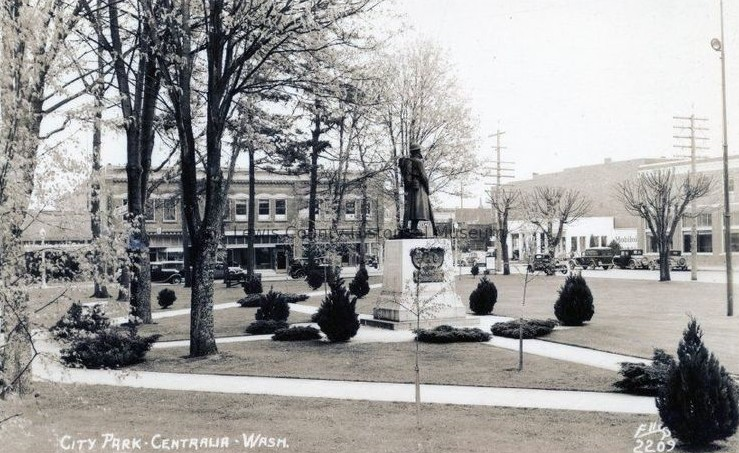
View of the statue's placement in George Washington Park

The Sentinel is located prominently in the middle of George Washington Park, the city's center square named after the city's founder, George Washington, a former slave. The artwork is part of the NRHP-listed Centralia Downtown Historic District. Within the park is the city's Carnegie library and a wooden bandstand, octagonal in shape. The square is surrounded by commercial office buildings and the Centralia Post Office, also an NRHP-listed site.

The NRHP lists the 25-square-foot (2.3 m^{2}) site to include the statue and a small, surrounding lawn but excludes any other memorial within George Washington Park, even those pertaining to the Armistice Day Riot.

=== Freedom Walk ===
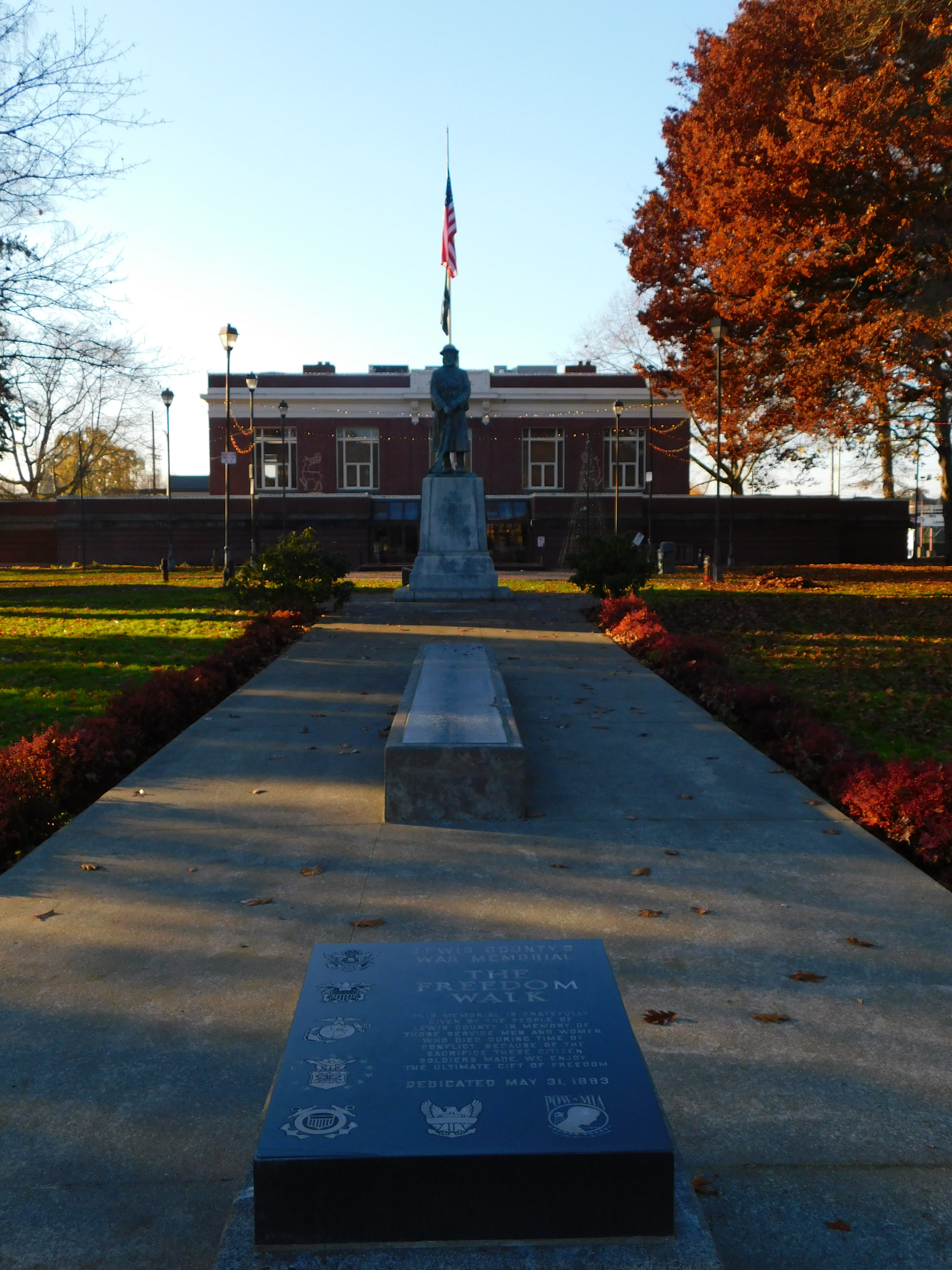
Freedom Walk, 2023

As part of an effort to expand the statue into a larger memorial within the park, the city added the Freedom Walk War Memorial in 1993, marked with an American black granite slab that individually honors all Lewis County veterans who perished during wars or military engagements since World War I. As of 2023, the war memorial is carved to list 355 veterans killed in action. A plaque was added at the end of the walk in honor of lives lost during the September 11, 2001 attacks.

=== IWW memorials ===
Attempts to add a memorial near the Sentinel, honoring the IWW's losses and its version in the tragedy were attempted several times. Controversial wording on the base of the Sentinel had long been a rallying effort to tell the IWW version of the Armistice Day Riot. The first recognition of the IWW's version was a small plaque installed by the Wobblies west of the Sentinel not long after the doughboy sculpture was dedicated.

A mural by Mike Alewitz depicting Wesley Everest was added across from the park on a building that was once an Elks Lodge. Known as The Resurrection of Wesley Everest, it portrays Everest as both a military man and laborer, surrounded by various symbolic scenes connected to IWW causes and beliefs. It also provides a representation of laborers in the logging industry the IWW felt were being exploited. Authorized by the Committee for the Centralia Union Mural Project, the organization hoped the mural would spark a conversation on the event, discharged of animosity. Despite the desire, reactions at the unveiling in December 1997 were mixed, with sides taken, requesting removal of the mural or that the truth of the event be told, favoring one version over the other.

In time after the mural was unveiled, an unknown person placed a plaque at the base of the park's flag pole. In favor of the labor movement, it mentions several key components of union labor, including 8-hour work days, guaranteed compensation, health and retirement benefits, and job security.

A potential memorial in time for the 100th anniversary of the riot was presented in 2018, but the effort was postponed due to disagreements on the location, and most crucially, the proposed text to be added to the marker. A bronze plaque was finally authorized and a formal dedication was held on November 11, 2023. The plaque, with the notation "For defending their Union Hall", lists the ten Wobblies who died during the Centralia Tragedy or were imprisoned in the aftermath. A rededication was held in June 2024 after the plaque was installed on a 7,500 lb (3,400 kg) granite block base that was located to the back of the doughboy sculpture, roughly to the northwest. The color and carved style was an intentional match of the base of the Sentinel statue. The $20,000 funding for the overall project, and the labor involved, was done mostly by union organizations or workers.

=== Other memorials ===
A monument authorized by the city in remembrance of a September 1996 campaign stop in Centralia by Bill Clinton and Al Gore was dedicated in the park in May 2008.

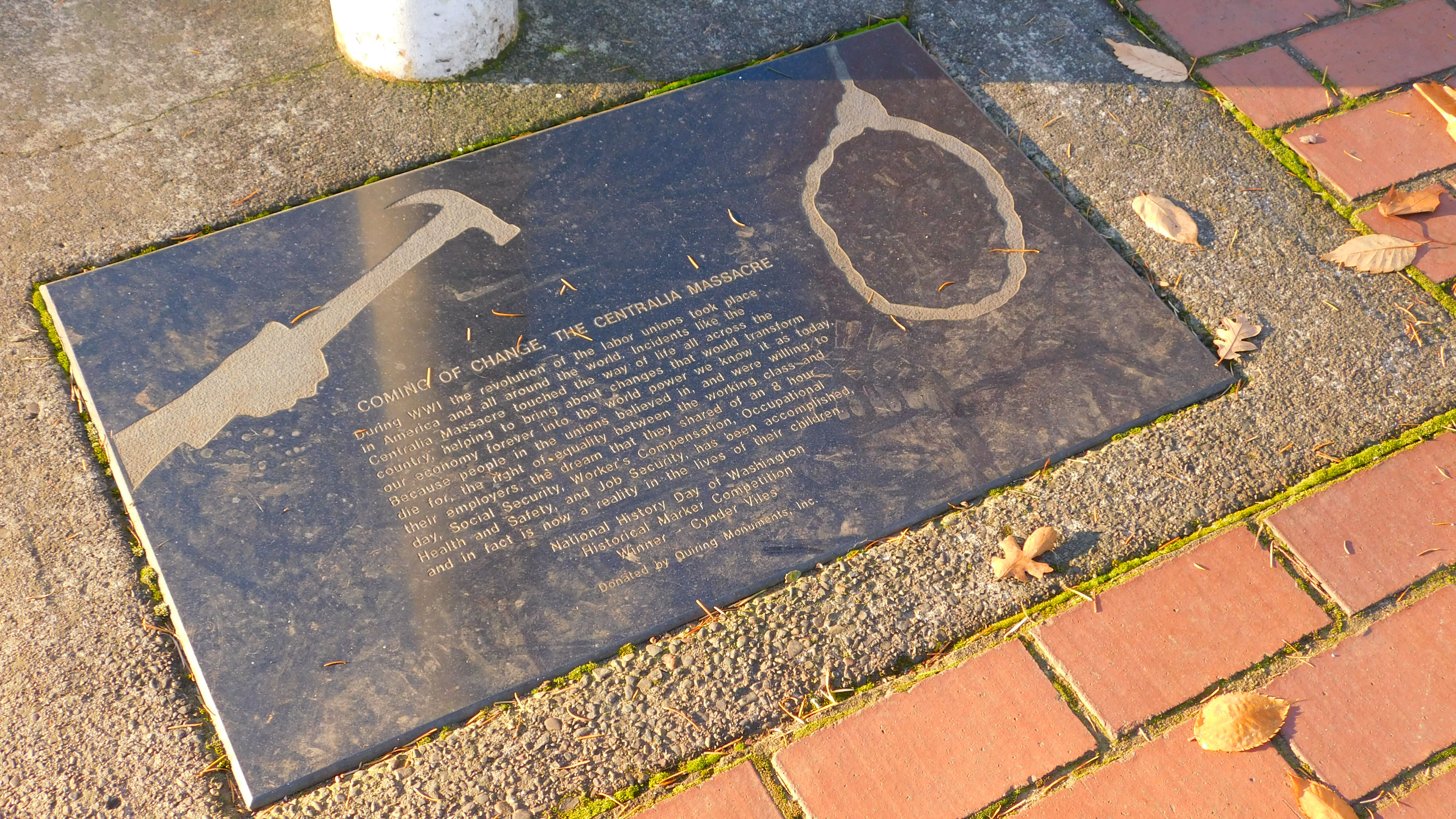
Memorial plaque for the Centralia Tragedy

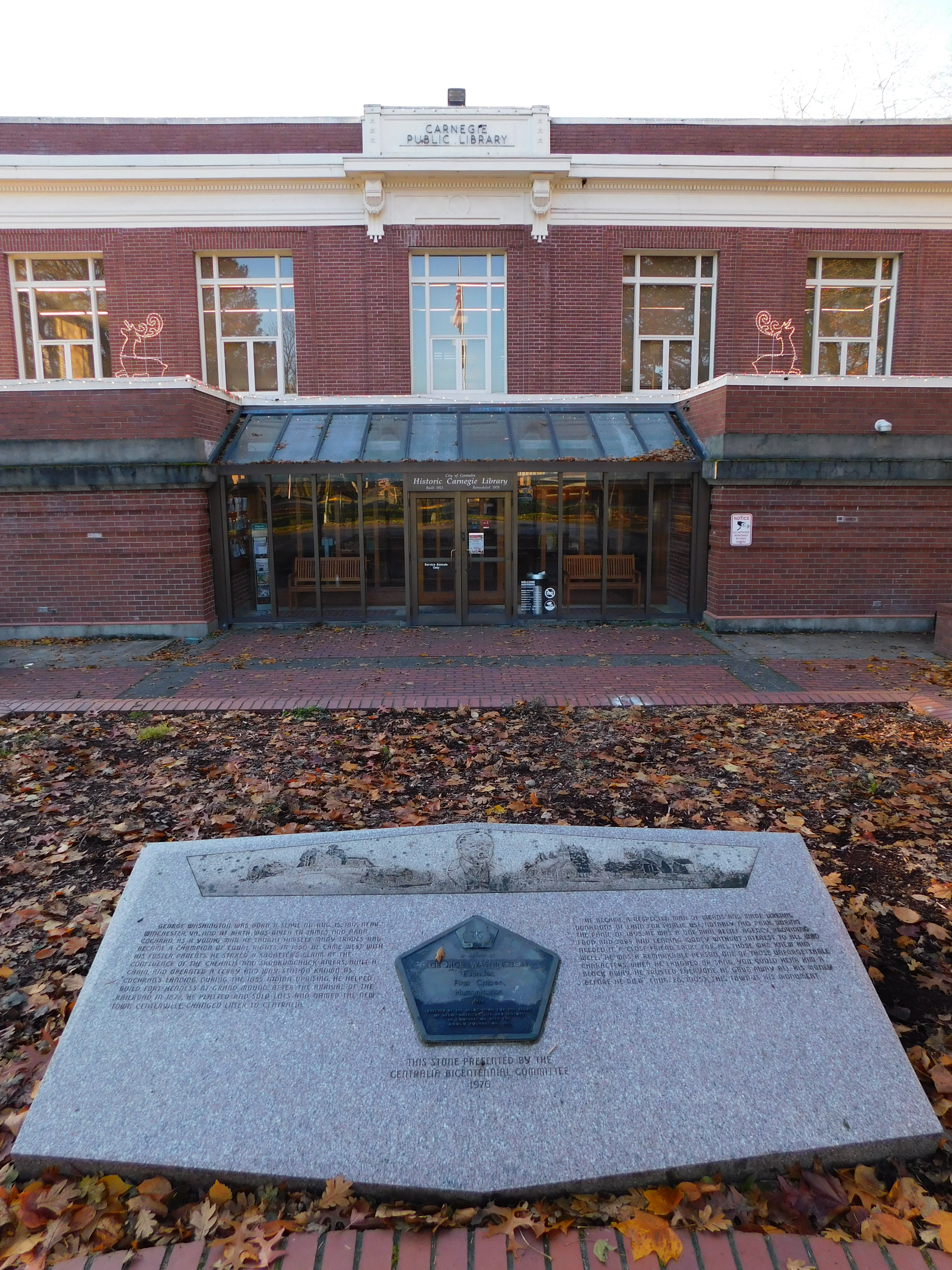
George Washington plaque

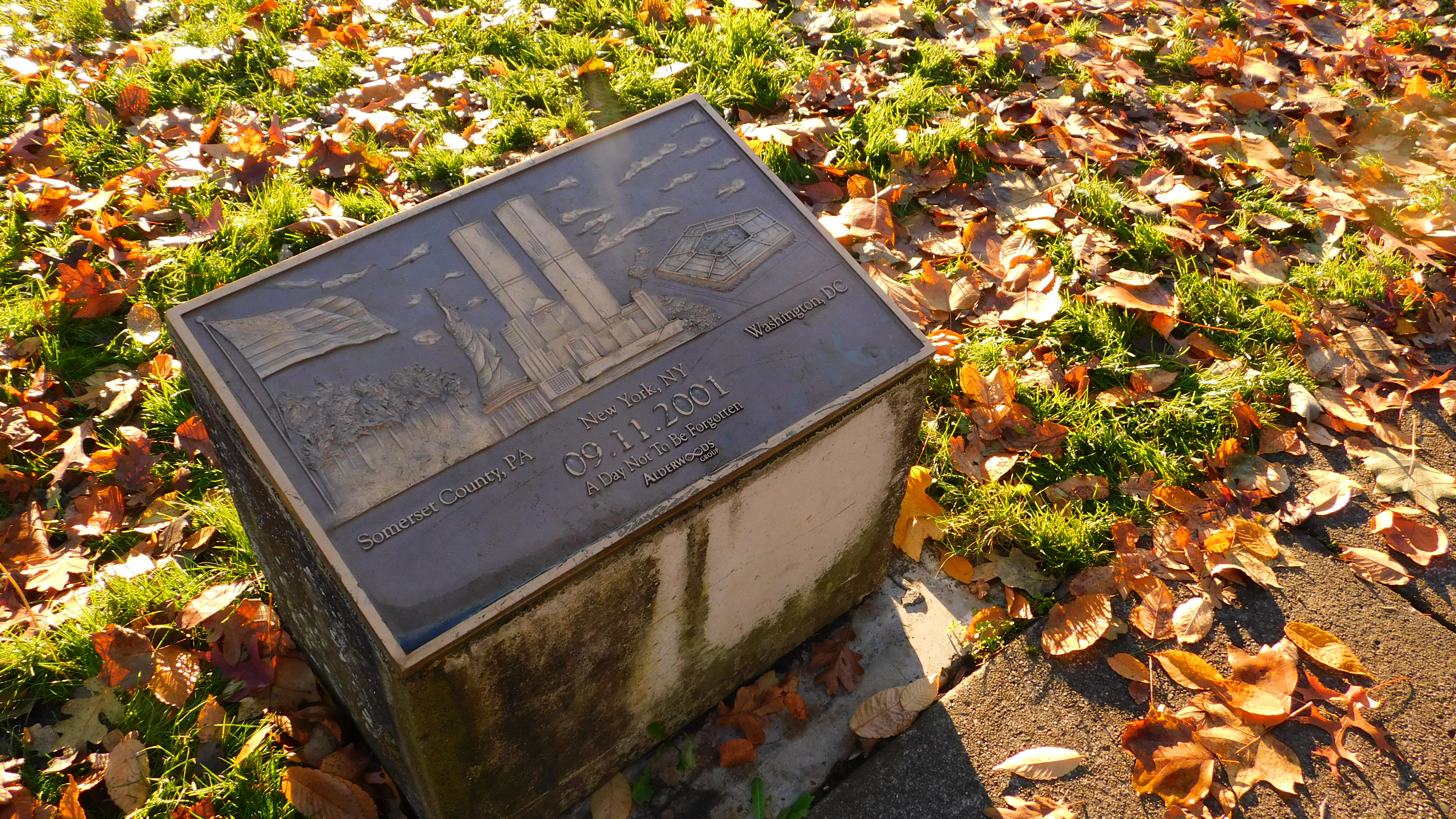
September 11 memorial at the park

== Significance ==
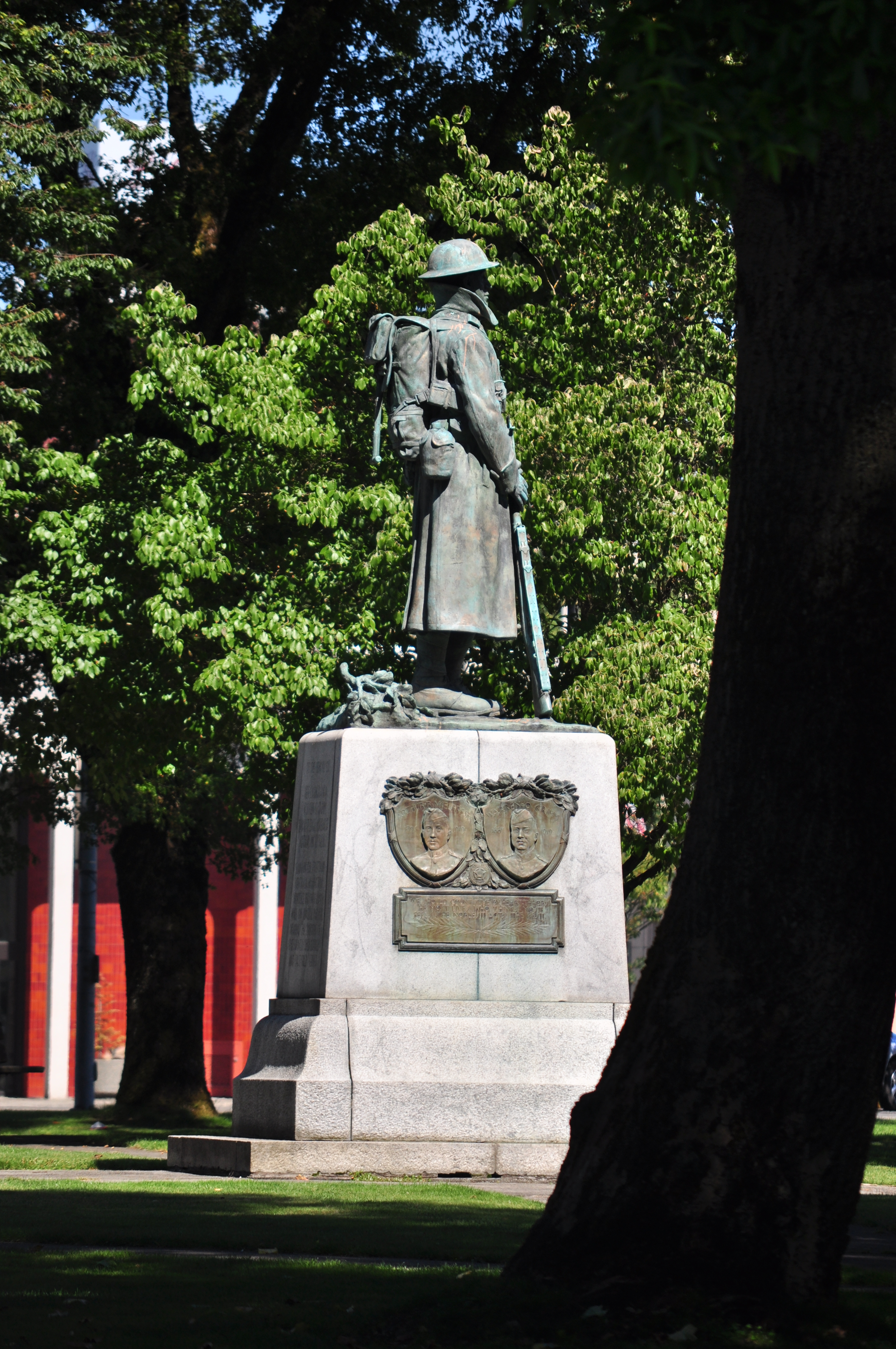
The Sentinel, south view

The NRHP nomination of the statue was considered significant due to its political and historic importance, as the artwork attempts to present an official version of the November 11, 1919 Armistice Day Riot. The Sentinel is described as having significant ideological and symbolic value tied to the American labor union movement of the time, as well as being the work of a master sculptor. The NRHP nomination specially mentions that the listing does not take sides in the Centralia Tragedy debate, that the artwork's political context, the background that led to its creation, the inscriptions on the base, and its location in the heart of Centralia, were the considerable factors of the NRHP listing. The form also mentions that the purpose of the statue, as a political statement beyond a standard war memorial to the slain legion members, is not questioned.

The Sentinel was added to the National Register of Historic Places on December 17, 1991. The artwork, with its associated historical context, was included as part of the NRHP's Multiple Property Documentation Form "Properties Associated with Centralia Armistice Day, 1919", due to meeting certain requirements for the connection of commemorative sites associated with the riot. Prior to the national designation, the statue was listed with the Washington State Heritage Register on August 7, 1987.

== See also ==
- Hubbard Bungalow
- Wesley Everest
- Wesley Everest Gravesite
