= Warship Under Sail =

2009 book by Lorraine McConaghy

Warship Under Sail: The USS Decatur in the Pacific West
- Author: Lorraine McConaghy
- Language: English
- Genre: Non-fiction
- Publisher: University of Washington Press
- Publication date: October 2009
- Publication place: United States
- ISBN: 978-0-295-98955-6

Warship Under Sail: The USS Decatur in the Pacific West is a historical nonfiction work by Seattle author Lorraine McConaghy. Based on archives of the United States Navy, it documents USS Decatur's 1854–1859 Pacific Ocean cruises. During this time Decatur played a part in the 1856 Battle of Seattle and William Walker's Nicaraguan filibuster.

== Bibliography ==
- McConaghy, Lorraine (October 2009). Warship Under Sail: The USS Decatur in the Pacific West. University of Washington Press. ISBN 978-0-295-98955-6.
