= Alonzo Victor Lewis =

American painter

Alonzo Lewis
- Born: 1886; Utah, United States
- Died: 1946 (aged 59–60)
- Notable work: The Sentinel; American Doughboy Bringing Home Victory; Winged Victory

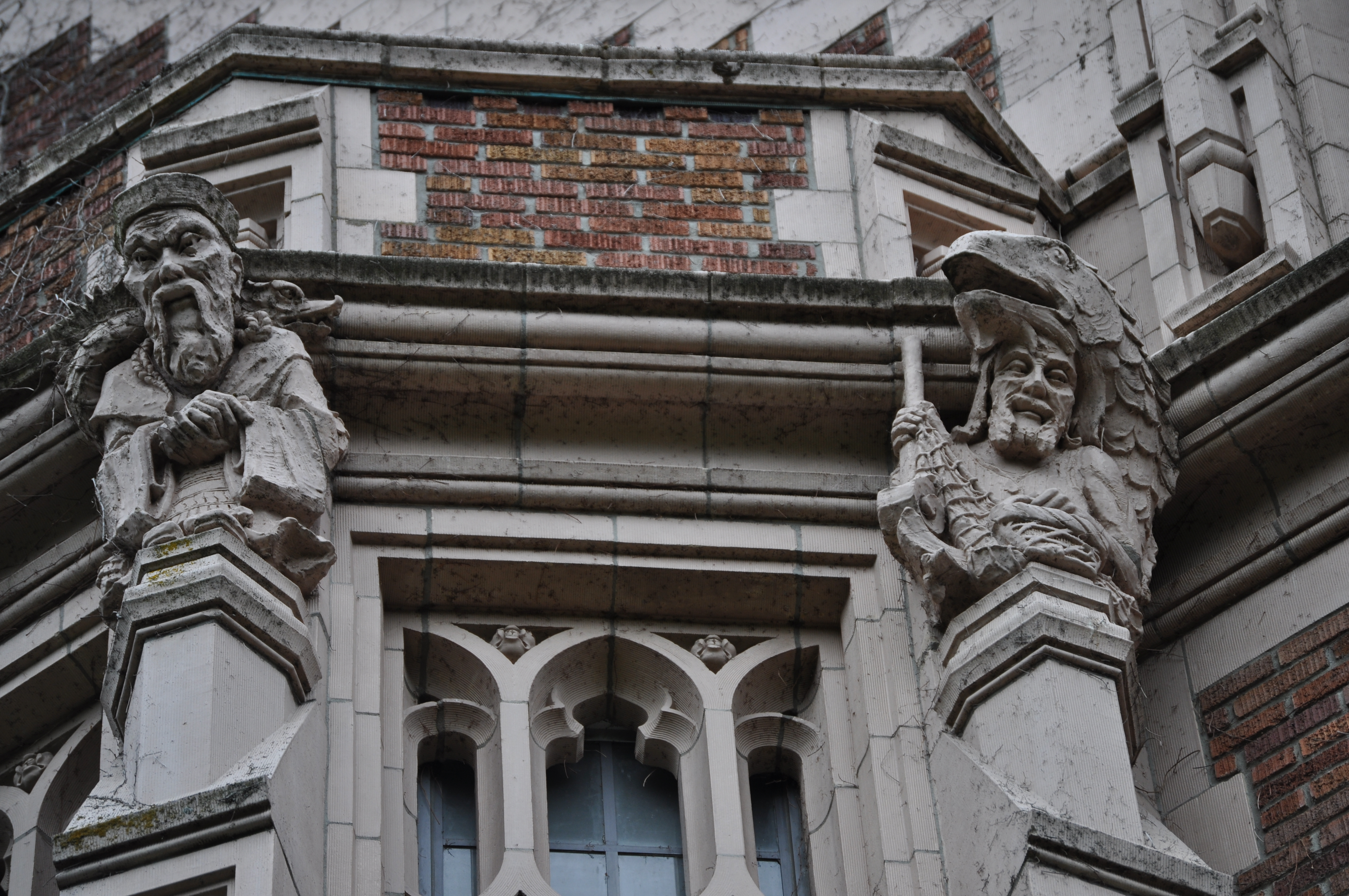
Chinese teacher (Confucius) and Fish teacher, two of the 44 works by Lewis adorning the University of Washington's Miller Hall, originally Education Hall (1922)

Alonzo Victor Lewis (1886–1946) was an American artist. He is primarily known for public sculptures in the State of Washington; he also painted in the Impressionist style.

Born in Utah, Lewis studied at the Art Institute of Chicago, then moved for a time to Spokane, Washington before settling in Seattle in 1912.

== Partial list of works ==
- 44 sculptures for Education Hall (now Miller Hall), University of Washington, Seattle. 1922.
- The First World Flight monument, Sand Point Air Field (now Magnuson Park), Seattle. 1924
- American Doughboy Bringing Home Victory, Seattle Center, Seattle, now located at Evergreen Washelli Memorial Park.
- Winged Victory, Washington State Capitol, Olympia, Washington. Dedicated 1938.
- Abraham Lincoln memorial sculpture, Spokane, Washington.
- Dr. Mark A. Matthews, 1942 sculpture of Mark A. Matthews, Denny Park, Seattle.
- The Prospector, Sitka, Alaska. Modeled in clay no later than 1942. Posthumously cast in bronze, dedicated 1949.
- The Sentinel, bronze memorial sculpture about the Centralia Tragedy, dedicated in 1924 in Centralia, Washington
