= McConaughy =

McConaughy is a surname. Notable people with the surname include:

- David McConaughy (1823–1902), attorney, cemetery president, and civic leader in Gettysburg, Pennsylvania, USA
- David McConaughy (college president) (1775–1852), the fourth president of Washington College from 1831 to 1852
- James L. McConaughy (1887–1948), American politician and a former Governor of Connecticut, USA
- Julia E. McConaughy (1834–1885), American litterateur and author
- Walter P. McConaughy (1908–2000), career American diplomat

== See also ==
- Lake McConaughy, reservoir, 9 miles north of Ogallala, Nebraska, United States
- Matthew McConaughey (born 1969), American actor, director, producer and writer
- McConnaughay
- McConnaughey
