= Robert McConachie =

English footballer

Personal information
- Full name: Robert J. McConachie
- Place of birth: England
- Position: Winger

Senior career*
Years	Team	Apps	(Gls)
1892–1893	The Wednesday	1	(0)
Total		1	(0)
- * Club domestic league appearances and goals

Robert J. McConachie was an English footballer who played in the Football League for The Wednesday. McConachie's only appearance for Wednesday came in a 1–0 defeat at Stoke on 1 April 1893.
