= Insurance Building (Olympia, Washington) =

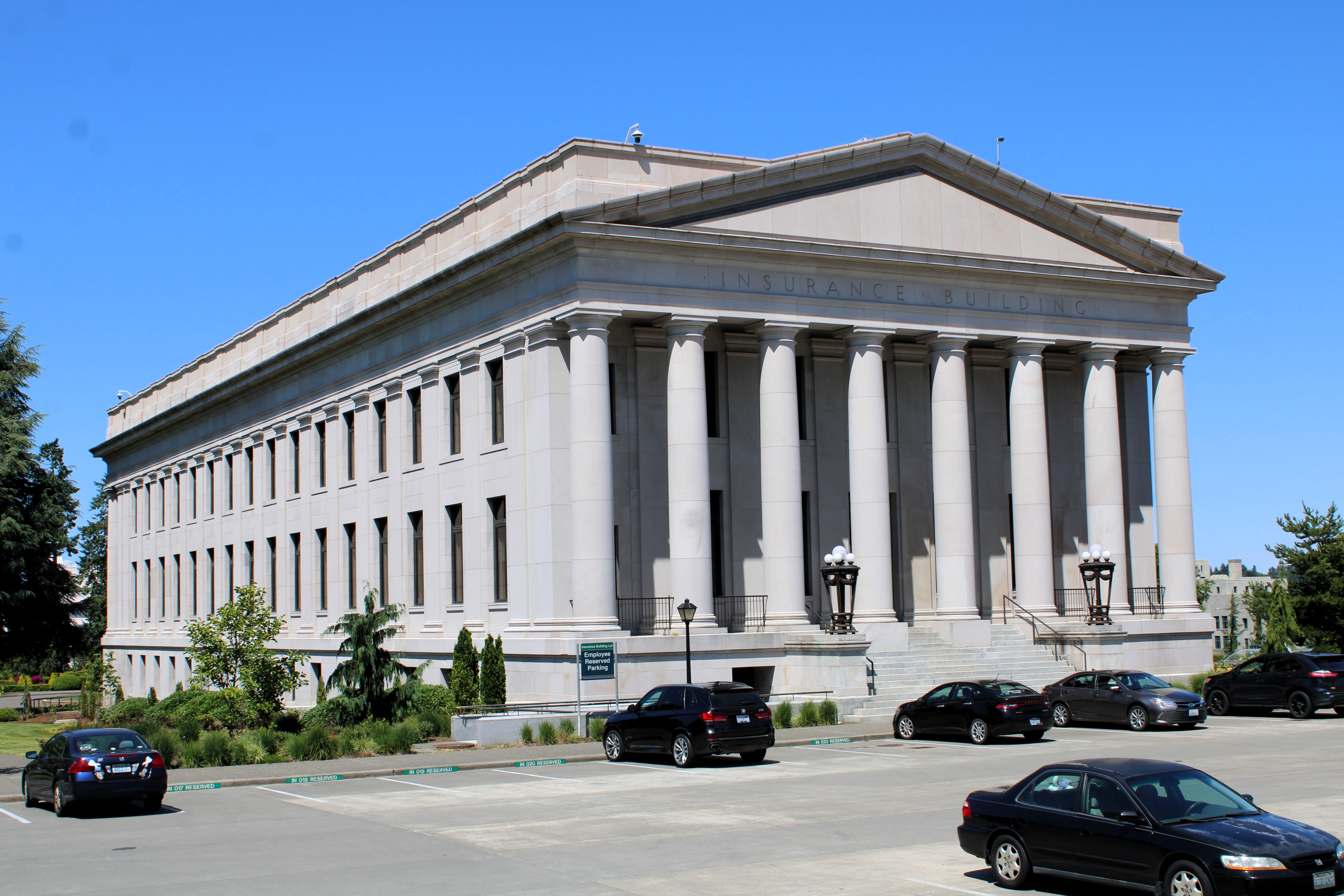
- Insurance Building in June 2023
- Interactive map of the Insurance Building area

General information
- Architectural style: American Neoclassicism
- Location: Olympia, Washington, United States of America
- Coordinates: 47.035905°N 122.903329°W
- Construction started: 1920
- Completed: 1921

Technical details
- Floor count: 4

Design and construction
- Architects: Walter R. Wilder and Harry K. White

The Insurance Building is a government building in Olympia, Washington that houses the offices of the Insurance Commissioner and State Auditor.

== History ==
The Insurance Building, along with other government buildings on the Washington State Capitol campus, was designed by the New York architectural team of Walter Wilder and Harry White.

The cornerstone of the Insurance Building was laid in 1920.

It was the second facility built on the new capital campus, following completion of the Temple of Justice, and was constructed from Wilkeson stone, a durable sandstone mined from quarries in Pierce County, Washington.

The cornerstone of the building was laid on April 30, 1920 in a Masonic ceremony overseen by Thomas Skaggs, a Masonic grand master and chairman of the state's Board of Control, and was preceded by a ceremonial processional formed by the Knights Templar of Tacoma and accompanied by the band of the Affifi Temple of the Nobles of the Mystic Shrine.

A dedication address was delivered by Governor Louis Hart. It was completed the following year with a final reported cost, including furnishings, of $1,087,498 (equivalent to $19.63 million in 2025).

During the 1949 Olympia earthquake, the Insurance Building was one of the two most heavily damaged structures in Olympia. Some of parts of gingerbread architecture elements fell off. Fifty years later, after the adjacent Legislative Building was damaged during the Nisqually earthquake, the office of the Governor of Washington was temporarily relocated to the Insurance Building.

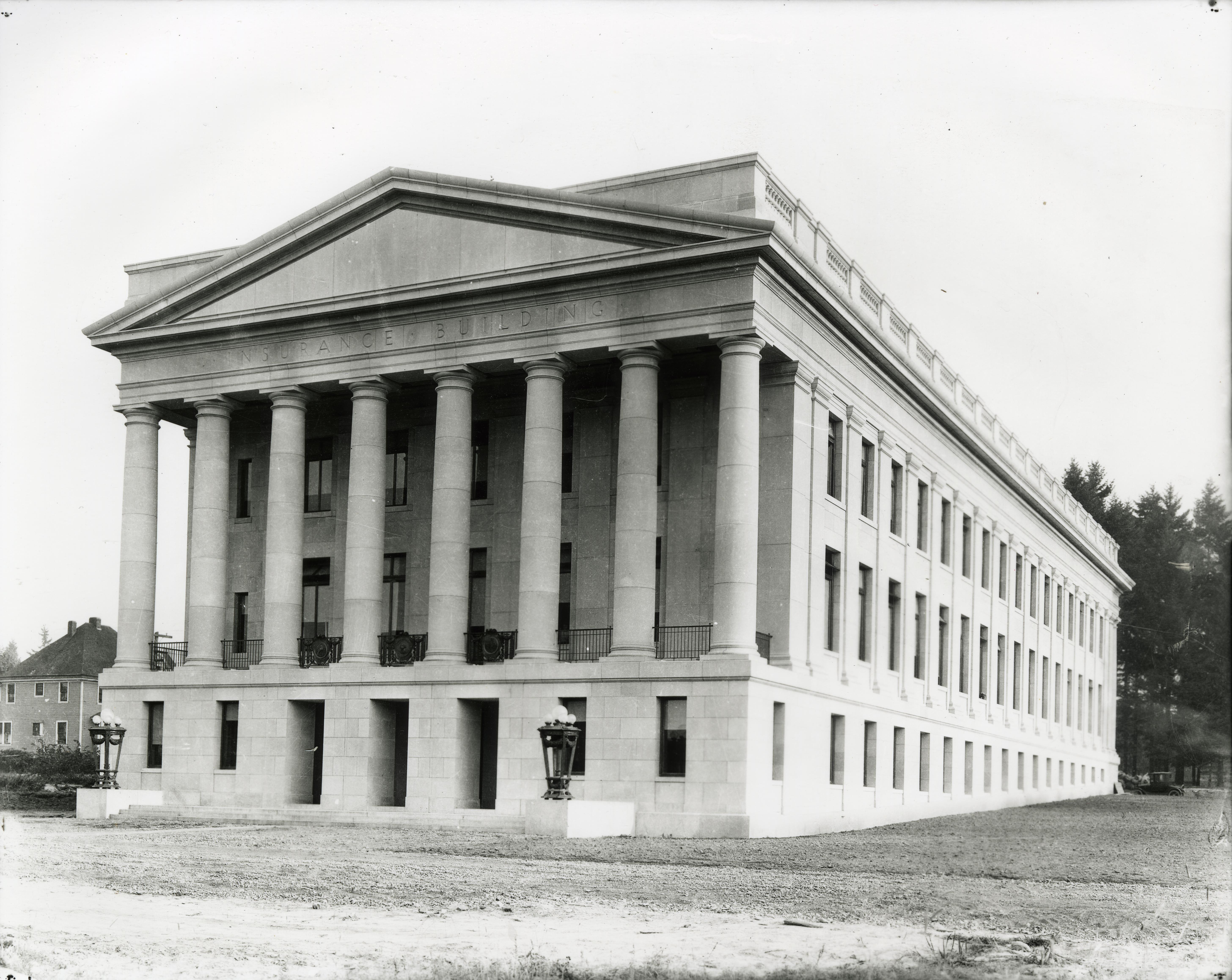
Photographic print, circa 1921.

== Design ==
The facility is a rectangular structure oriented with the longer axis running north and south. To the north of the building is the "Winged Victory Monument," the state's memorial to World War I veterans, designed by Alanzo Victor Lewis and installed in 1938.

The north and south ends of the building have colonnades supporting an unembellished frieze and pediment, while the east and west sides of the structure consist of rows of windows.

== See also ==
Media related to Insurance Building (Washington State Capitol) at Wikimedia Commons

- Washington State Capitol
- History of Olympia, Washington
