= Lorraine McConaghy =

Lorraine McConaghy is a historian working at Museum of History and Industry in Seattle, Washington, USA.

McConaghy completed her Ph.D. in United States urban history at the University of Washington in 1993.

She was the recipient of the Washington State Historical Society's Robert Gray Medal in 2010. The medal is the society's highest prize, awarded for distinguished contributions to Pacific Northwest history.

== Bibliography ==
- McConaghy, Lorraine; Sherry A. Boswell (August 1996). Raise Hell and Sell Newspapers: Alden J. Blethen & the Seattle Times. Washington State University Press. ISBN 0-87422-127-7.
- McConaghy, Lorraine (October 2009). Warship Under Sail: The USS Decatur in the Pacific West. University of Washington Press. ISBN 978-0-295-98955-6.
- McConaghy, Lorraine (November 2011). New Land North of the Columbia: Historic Documents that Tell the Story of Washington State from Territory to Today. Sasquatch Books. ISBN 978-1-57061-693-8.
