= Annunciation of San Giovanni Valdarno =

Panel painting by Fra Angelico

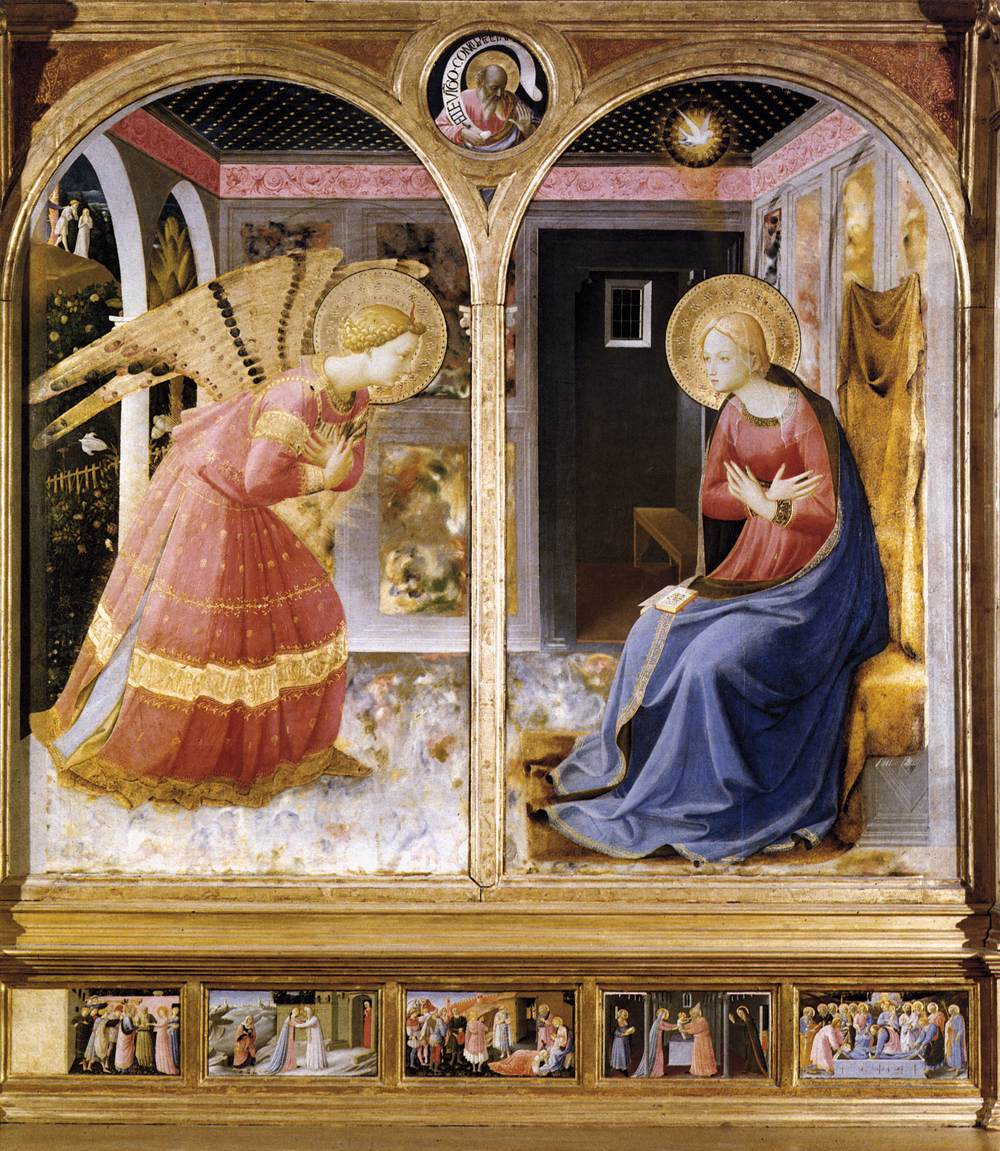
- Artist: Fra Angelico
- Year: c. 1430–1432
- Medium: tempera on panel
- Dimensions: 195 cm × 158 cm (77 in × 62 in)
- Location: Museo della Basilica di Santa Maria delle Grazie, San Giovanni Valdarno

The Annunciation of San Giovanni Valdarno is a painting by the Italian Early Renaissance master Fra Angelico, painted c. 1430 to 1432 in tempera on panel. It is part of a series of Annunciation panels painted by Fra Angelico in the 1430s. The other two are the Annunciation of Cortona and the Annunciation.

The Annunciation of San Giovanni Valdarno was looted from Italy during the Second World War by the Germans and returned to the country via the work of Rodolfo Siviero. It is now held at the Museo della Basilica di Santa Maria delle Grazie in San Giovanni Valdarno.

== History ==
The Annunciation of San Giovanni Valdarno is one of three panel paintings of the subject by Fra Angelico. The two others are the Annunciation in the Prado in Madrid and the Annunciation of Cortona in the Museo Diocesano of Cortona.

In 1432, Fra Angelico was working on an Annunciation painting for the church of Sant'Alessandro in Brescia, of which no trace remains. Several years later, the same church commissioned another Annunciation panel, this time from the Venetian artist Jacopo Bellini (who was paid in 1443). That commission suggests that Angelico's work never arrived in Brescia and was taken to another location, for unknown reasons. Some art historians believe that the Annunciation of Cortona was originally intended for Sant'Alessandro, others the Annunciation of San Giovanni Valdarno.

The Annunciation of San Giovanni Valdarno arrived at the Convento di San Francesco a Montecarlo in San Giovanni Valdarno, c. 1438. It remained there until the 20th century. During World War II, the painting was looted from Italy by the Germans and returned to the country by Rodolfo Siviero.

== Description ==
The scene is composed in a similar manner to the first panel in the series, the Annunciation of Cortona, with some differences. First of all, the composition is divided into two sections rather than three, with the garden reduced to a glimpse through the arches on the left side. Mary and the angel are placed and clothed like the Annunciation of Cortona, with a greater use of light. The illumination arrives consistently from the left, from the garden, to light drapery and the architecture.

Fra Angelico used a vanishing point placed inside the house, rather than outside, which concentrates attention on the spectacle of the Annuciation. Like Masolino da Panicale's Annunciation, the scene's space is divided in two by arches on the first floor. The building has a transitional architecture somewhere between traditional pointed, polyptych medieval design and the squared architecture of the Renaissance. At the center of the arches, there is a medallion with a figure of a prophet, who is looking at Mary and holds in his hand a paper that certifies the truth of his prophecy.

Unlike many works of the time from Arezzo, the painting depicts a range of rich colors. The colors vary from the green of the garden, to the rose and gold of the angel's clothes, to the blue and red of Mary, ending with the starry ceiling of the portico and the delicate marble decorations of the walls and floor.

At left, as in the preceding works, the enclosed garden alludes to the virginity of Mary and is depicted with a verdant multitude of plants. Among the species shown, the palm in particular recalls the future martyrdom of Christ. On a hill at the upper left corner of the painting, there is an tiny episode of Adam and Eve being evicted from Paradise.

== Predella ==
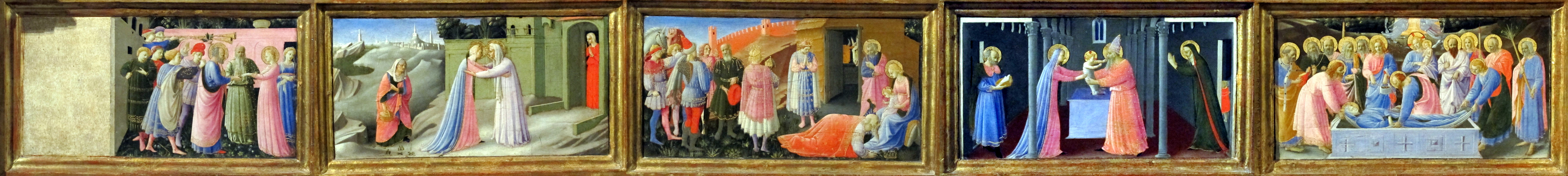

In its predella, the Annunciation of San Giovanni Valdarno is displayed with five scenes from the life of Mary, attributed to an assistant of Angelico, Zanobi Strozzi.
