= Perugia Altarpiece =

Painting by Fra Angelico

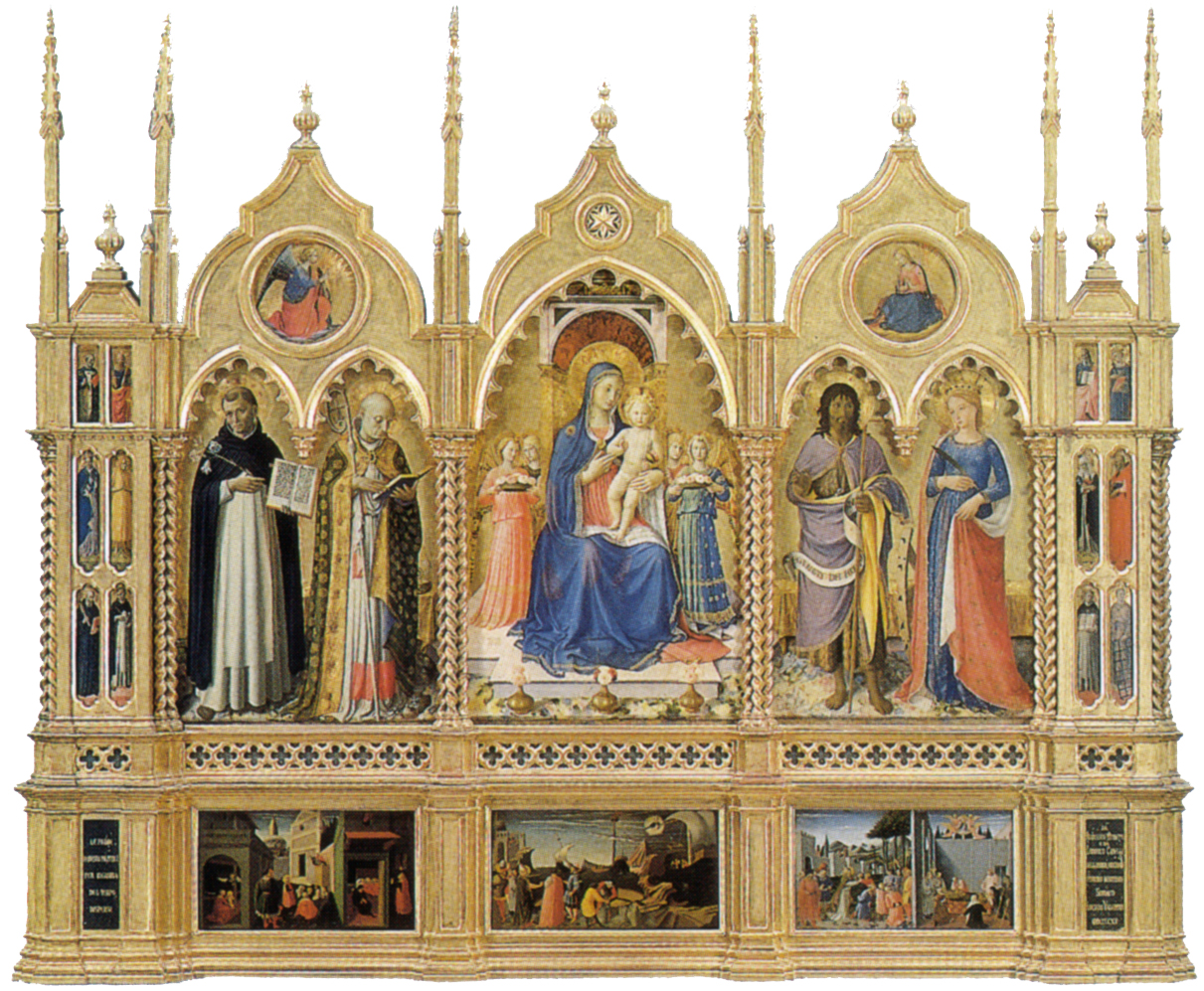
- Artist: Fra Angelico
- Year: 1437 or 1438
- Medium: Tempera on wood
- Location: Galleria Nazionale dell'Umbria, Perugia

The Perugia Altarpiece (Italian: Pala di Perugia) is a painting by the Italian early Renaissance painter Fra Angelico, housed in the Galleria Nazionale dell'Umbria of Perugia, Italy.

== History ==
The painting was executed for the St. Nicholas Chapel in the Basilica of San Domenico, Perugia. In the early 19th century, it was split and partially dispersed, and some of the predella panels were acquired by the Pinacoteca Vaticana. In Perugia were executed copies of these panels, enclosed into a neo-Gothic frame. The polyptych also included some small depictions of saints, on the side piers, and two tondos with the Annunciation Angel and the Annunciation, in the cusps.

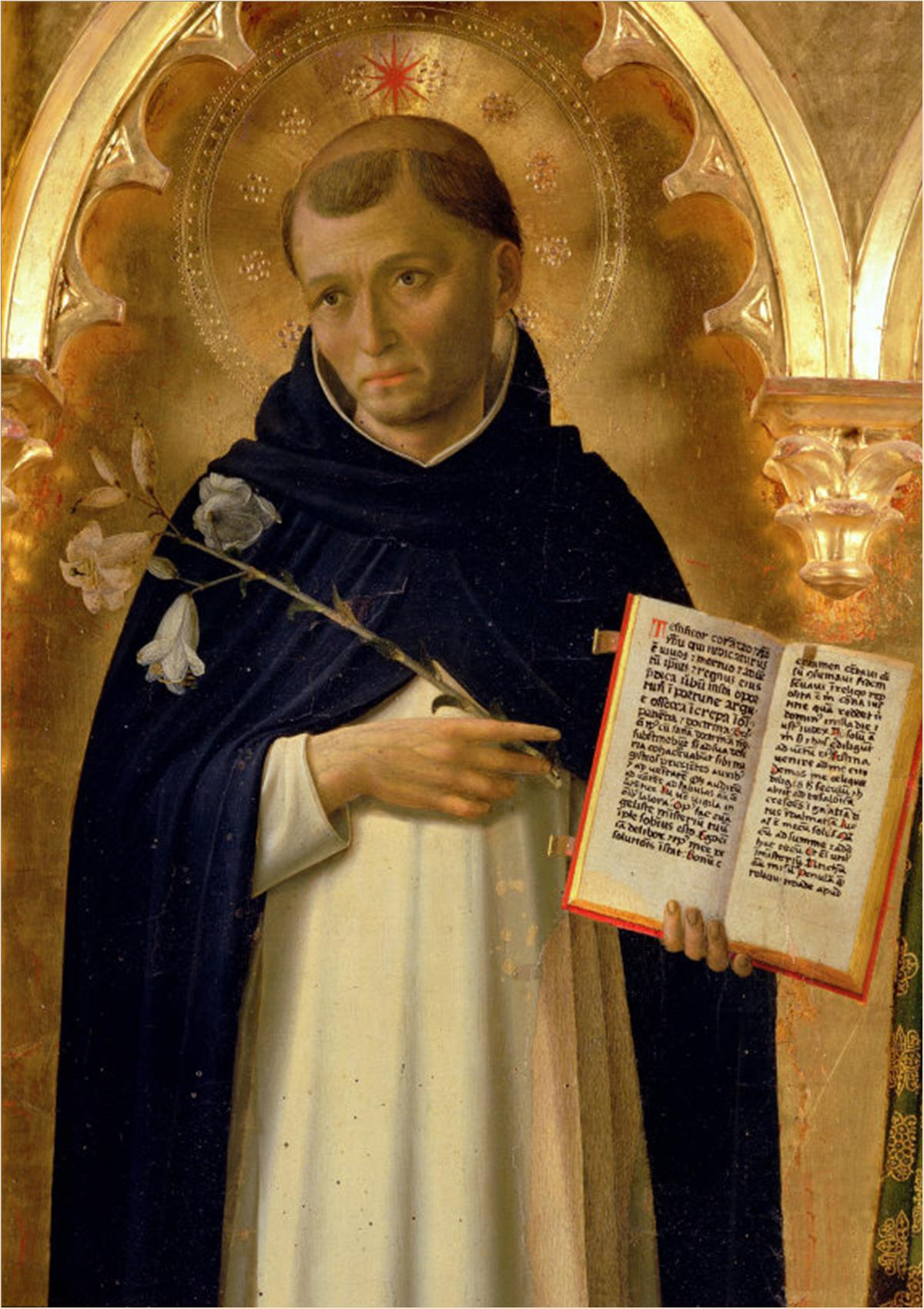
Side panel depicting St. Dominic, by Fra Angelico

== Description ==
The work includes a large central panel, depicting the Madonna Enthroned with Child and Angels, which was fully painted by Fra Angelico. The two side panels, each forming two arched sub-panels and including a figure of saint. On the left are St. Dominic and St. Nicholas, attributed to Angelico, while on the right are St. John the Baptist and St. Catherine of Alexandria, considered to be mostly by his workshop.

The central Madonna is a Maestà depiction, and sits on a large throne painted using geometric perspective. In front of her is a step with vases housing three white and red roses (symbolic of the Virgin's purity and a forecast of Christ's Passion, respectively). The panel resembles that in the Cortona Triptych, especially for the Madonna, the throne's arch and the placement of the angels. The pavement is decorated with marble tarsia, already used by Fra Angelico in earlier works such as the San Pietro Martire Triptych (1428–1429).

The saints' figures are less monumental than in the later Tabernacle of the Lanaioli (1433–1435). Behind them is a table, covered by a brocade drape decorated in gold, over which is St. Nicholas' mitre.

The predella panels portray scenes of the Life of St. Nicholas.

== Sources ==
- Cornini, Guido (2000). Beato Angelico. Florence: Giunti. ISBN 88-09-01602-5.
