= Rodolfo Siviero =

Italian secret agent (1911–1983)

- Born: 24 December 1911; Guardistallo, Italy
- Died: 1983 (aged 71–72); Florence, Italy
- Other name: "The 007 of art"
- Citizenship: Italian
- Education: University of Florence
- Occupations: Secret agent, art historian, intellectual
- Known for: Recovering artworks stolen by Nazis
- Parent(s): Giovanni Siviero (father), Caterina Bulgarini (mother)
- Espionage activity
- Country: Italy
- Allegiance: Italy
- Service branch: Servizio Informazioni Militare (SIM)
- Service years: 1930s – 1983
- Rank: Minister Plenipotentiary (after the war)
- Operations: Recovery of stolen artworks
- Other work: President of the Accademia delle Arti del Disegno (1970s)

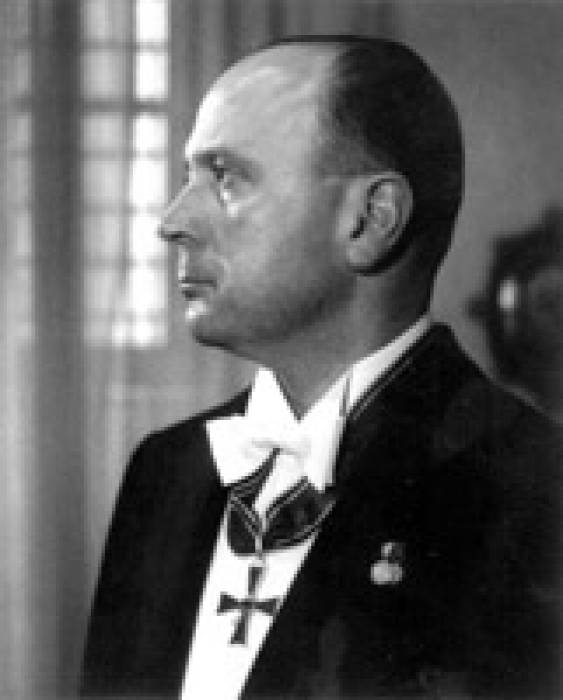
Rodolfo Siviero.

Rodolfo Siviero (24 December 1911 – 1983) was an Italian secret agent, art historian and intellectual, most notable for his important work in recovering artworks stolen from Italy during the Second World War as part of the 'Nazi plunder'.

== Life ==
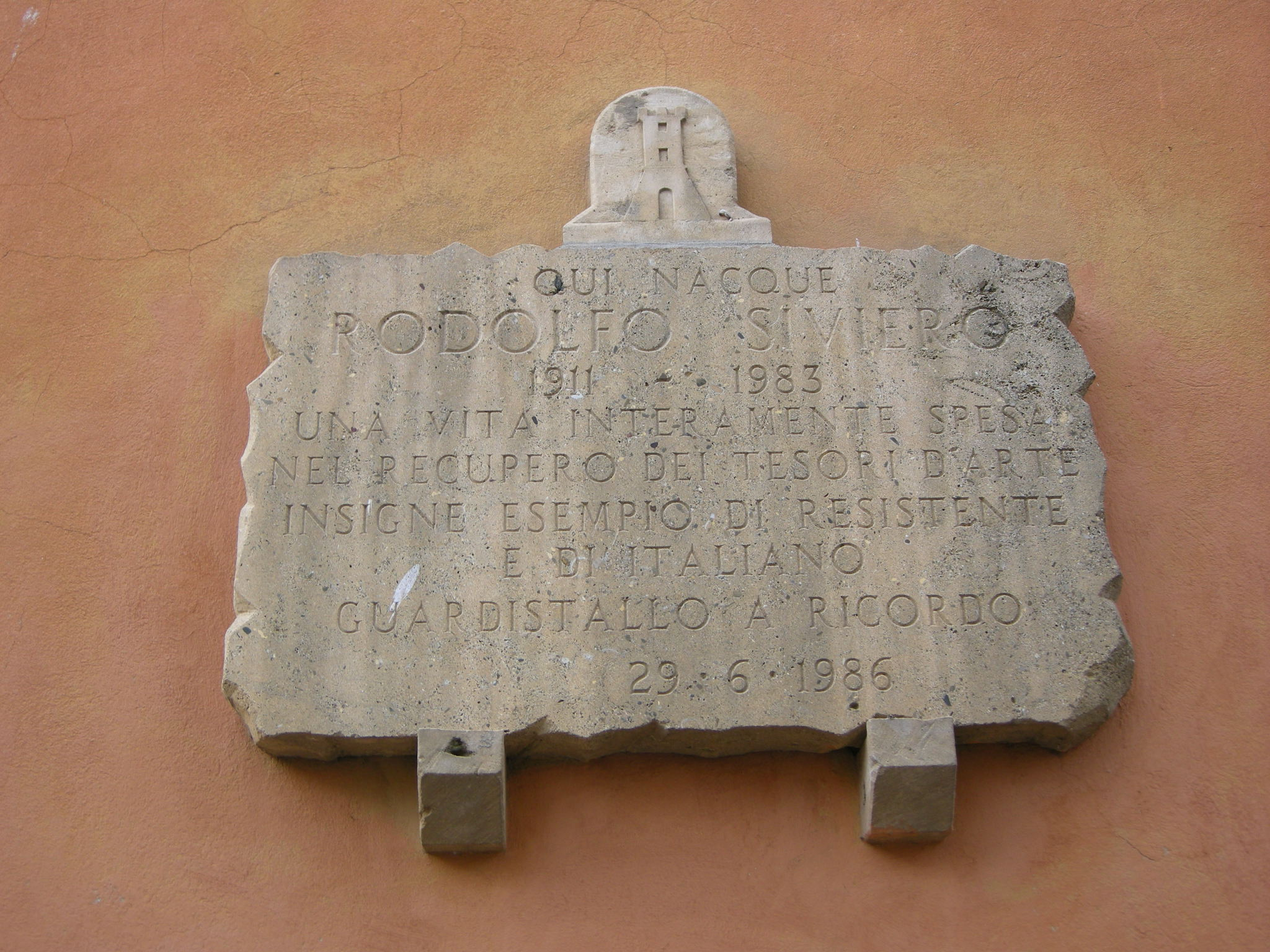
Plaque at Siviero's birthplace in Guardistallo (PI)

Rodolfo Siviero was born at Guardistallo, Italy, the son of Giovanni Siviero, a Venetian non-commissioned officer in the Carabinieri and commander of its local station, and his Sienese wife Caterina Bulgarini. He moved from the province of Pisa to Florence in 1924 and continued his studies in arts and letters at the University of Florence, with the aim of becoming an art critic. In the 1930s, he joined the Servizio Informazioni Militare, Italy's secret service, and became a Fascist in the conviction that only a totalitarian regime could revolutionise and improve the country. In 1937, under the guise of a scholarship in art history, he set out for Berlin to collect information on the Nazi regime there.

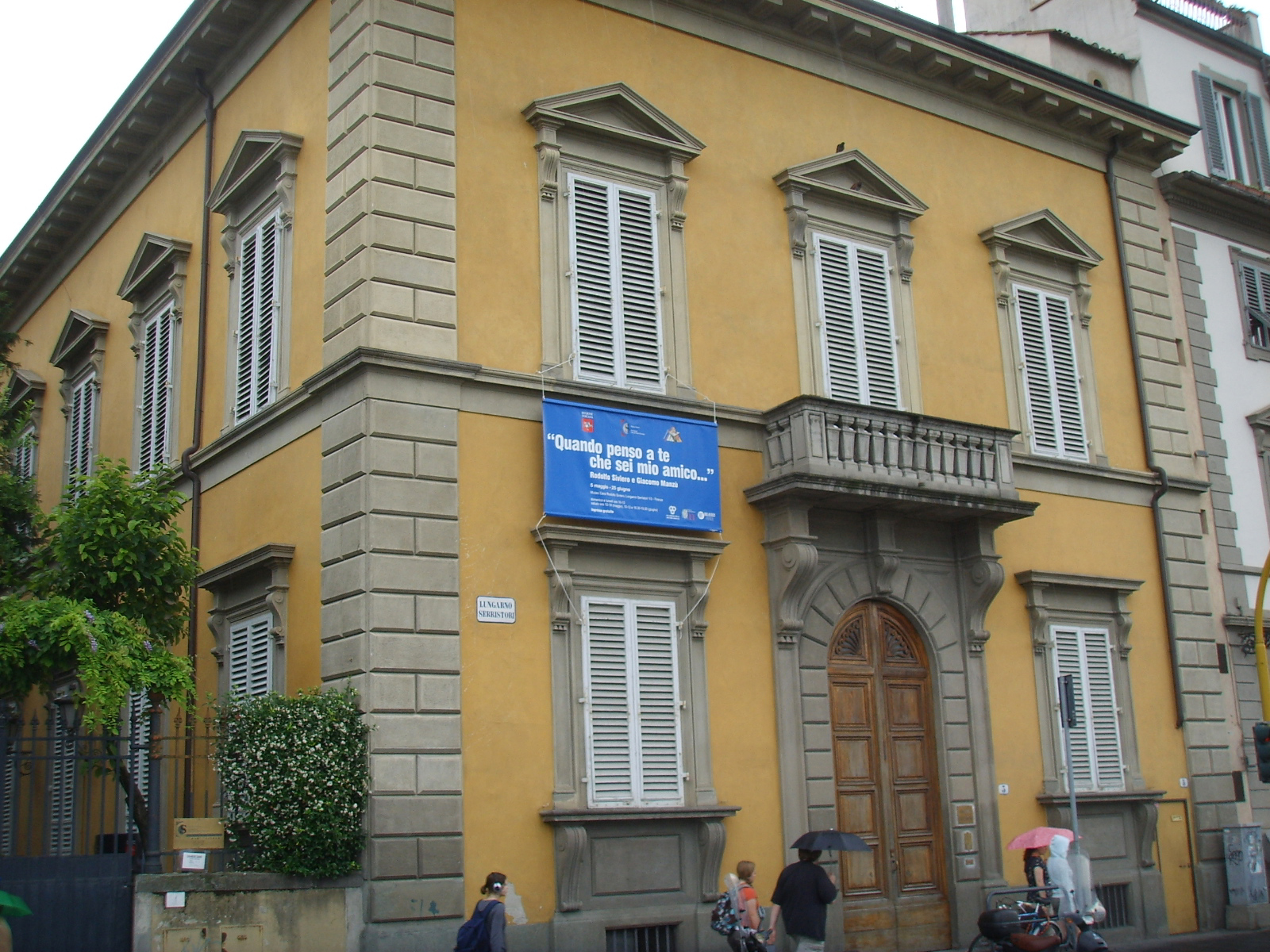
Casa Siviero

After the Badoglio Proclamation on 8 September 1943 announcing the Allied-Italian armistice, Siviero sided with the anti-fascist front. His main work from then on would be monitoring the Nazi military body known as the Kunstschutz, which had originally been set up to protect cultural heritage during the war years but had under Nazi directives shifted to shipping a large number of artworks from Italy to Germany. From the Jewish art historian Giorgio Castelfranco's house on the Lungarno Serristori in Florence (now the Casa Siviero museum), Siviero also coordinated the Italian partisans' intelligence activities. In April to June 1944, he was imprisoned and tortured in Villa Triste on Florence's via Bolognese by the Fascist militias led by Mario Carità and known as the Banda Carità. Having resisted their interrogation, he was released thanks to the efforts of some Republican officials who were working undercover for the Allies.

Thanks to his reputation for resistance work, in 1946 Siviero was made "minister plenipotentiary" by Alcide De Gasperi, President of the Council of Ministers. Siviero was appointed to that role to direct a diplomatic mission to the Allied military government of Germany to establish the principle of returning Italian artworks looted by the Germans. Siviero managed to get most of those looted works back to Italy and from the 1950s onwards worked for the Italian government systematically researching all artworks stolen and exported from Italy. This intensive activity gained him the nickname of "the 007 of art" and lasted until his death in 1983. During that period Siviero often denounced the lack of attention given by government institutions to recovering artworks. In the 1970s he also became president of the Accademia delle Arti del Disegno.

Rodolfo Siviero died in Florence. In his will, he left his house and all its contents to the Regione Toscana, which turned it into a museum dedicated to him eight years after his death. Since 1998, that museum has been managed by the Regione Toscana in collaboration with the "Amici dei Musei e dei Monumenti Fiorentini". Its first floor is open to the public, though the second floor (given in usufruct by Siviero to his sister) is not yet ready.

== List of works recovered or conserved ==
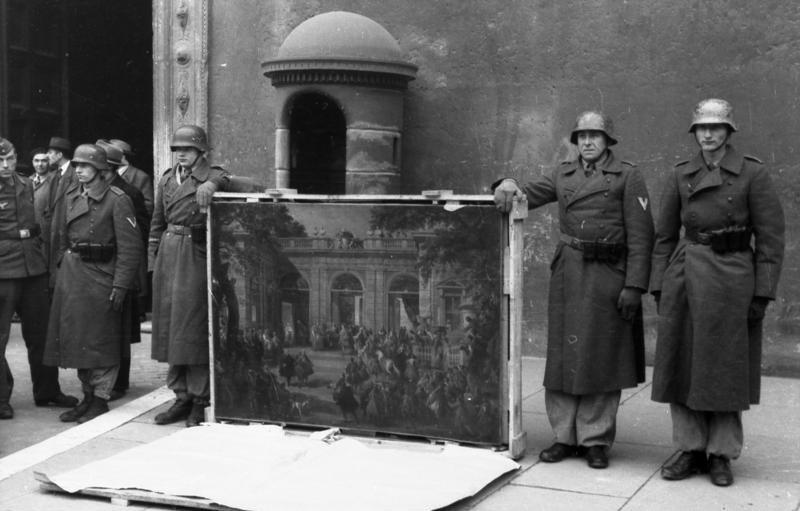
German soldiers of the Hermann Göring Division posing in front of the Palazzo Venezia in Rome in 1944 with a picture taken from the Biblioteca del Museo Nazionale di Napoli before the Allied forces' arrival in the city, during the restitution ceremony of the works at the RSI

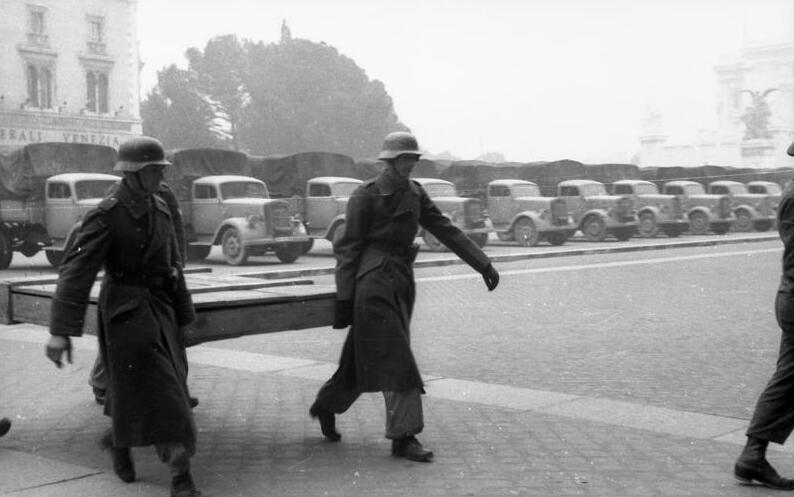
German soldiers carrying flat wooden crates containing artworks being looted in Rome in 1943

- The saving of the Annunciation of San Giovanni Valdarno by Beato Angelico (now in the Basilica of Santa Maria delle Grazie in San Giovanni Valdarno) was the most important act of restitution brought about by Siviero during the German occupation. In 1944, Siviero became aware that Hermann Göring had gained possession of some artworks and, with the aid of two monks in the convent of piazza Savonarola in Florence, managed to hide the Annunciazione of San Giovanni Valdarno from the German troops charged with removing it.
- During the German occupation, Siviero also saved paintings owned by De Chirico taken under false pretences from his villa in Fiesole, after De Chirico and his wife were forced to flee by German repression. All these paintings were hidden in a warehouse of the Soprintendenza.
- On 3 July 1944, German soldiers brought over 200 paintings from the Uffizi to South Tyrol. From 25 July to 11 August that year they evacuated sculptures from the Uffizi, the Museo dell'Opera del Duomo and other museums in Florence to South Tyrol, in the castle at Taufers Castle. The information service under Siviero controlled these works' movements and were able to pass on this information to the Allies, leading to all these works' return to Florence in 1945.
- In 1947, Siviero won the return of works taken from the art and archaeological museums in Naples by the Germans in 1943 and hidden in the Abbey of Monte Cassino, including the Danae by Titian (taken from the Museo di Capodimonte and given to Goering as a birthday present in January 1944) and sculptures such as the Apollo from Pompeii and the Hermes by Lysippus.
- On 16 November 1948, Siviero organised the return to Italy of the Lancellotti Discobolus (copy of an ancient Greek original by Myron and property of prince Lancellotti), the Leda by Tintoretto and the Equestrian Portrait of Giovanni Carlo Doria by Rubens and 36 other works, all illegally exported to Germany from 1937 to 1943 with the complicity of the Italian fascist regime.
- The Madonna con Bambino by Masaccio was recovered by Siviero for the first time in 1947, then again on 9 April 1973 and March 1971.
- On 16 December 1953, in Bonn, Siviero concluded an accord with Friedrich Jantz allowing Siviero to bring back to Italy all works looted by Germany during the Second World War.
- In 1963, Siviero recovered the two paintings of The Labours of Hercules by Antonio del Pollaiuolo from Los Angeles. These had not been recovered among the cache hidden at South Tyrol, since German soldiers had hidden them, then smuggled them to the USA.
- Siviero also recovered works whose disappearances were not linked to the Second World War, including the mosaics of the basilica of Junius Bassus and the Selinunte Ephebe (the Ephebe having been stolen from the town council of Castelvetrano by a gang of robbers and after many travels ending up being found in Foligno).

== Selected works ==
=== Poetry ===
- (in Italian) Siviero, R. (1936), La selva oscura, Firenze, Le Monnier

=== Monographs ===
- (in Italian) Siviero, R. (1948), Sulle opere d'arte italiane recuperate in Germania, Roma, Accademia nazionale dei Lincei
- (in Italian) Siviero, R. (editor) (1954), Gli ori e le ambre del museo nazionale di Napoli, Firenze, Sansoni
- (in Italian) Siviero, R. (1960), Viaggio nella Russia di Krusciov, Firenze, Sansoni
- (in Italian) Siviero, R. (1976), La difesa delle opere d'arte: testimonianza su Bruno Becchi, Firenze, Accademia delle Arti del Disegno (s.d.)
- (in Italian) Siviero, R. (1984), L'arte e il nazismo: esodo e ritrovo delle opere d'arte italiane, 1938-1963, Firenze, Cantini

=== Curatorial catalogues ===
- (in Italian) Siviero, R. (editor) (1950), Seconda Mostra Nazionale delle opere d'arte recuperate in Germania, Firenze, Sansoni
- (in Italian) Siviero, R. (editor) (1950), Second national exhibition of the works of art recovered in Germany, Firenze, Sansoni
- (in Italian) Siviero, R. (1964), Le statue dell'Universita inaugurate nel secondo centenario della restaurazione dell'Ateneo, 1764–1964, Sansoni, Firenze

== Notes ==
Mentioned as a significant player in "Double Dealer" by Peter Watson, a factual exposé of art fraud.

Double Dealer Peter Watson, London: Hutchinson & Co., 1983

== Bibliography ==
- Collotti, E.; Mariani, R., eds. (1984). The water colours of Hitler: recovered art works: homage to Rodolfo Siviero. Florence: Alinari I.D.E.A. ISBN 978-88-7292-368-9.
- Paolucci, F. (2003). Catalogo del Museo Casa Rodolfo Siviero di Firenze. La raccolta archeologica (in Italian). Florence: Olschki. ISBN 978-88-222-5237-1.
- Martinelli, Maurizio (2005). "L'eredità di Rodolfo Siviero: Una Casa-Museo e Un Messaggio Iconico Sulla Fruizione Dell'arte". Lares. 71 (2): 287–94. JSTOR 26233883.
- Sanna, A. (2006). Catalogo del Museo Casa Rodolfo Siviero di Firenze. Pitture e sculture dal Medioevo al Settecento (in Italian). Florence: Olschki. ISBN 978-88-222-5498-6.
- Martinelli, M. (2007). L'immagine del guerriero attraverso Europa, Africa, Asia (in Italian). Florence: Centro stampa Giunta Regione Toscana.
- Sanna, A. (2007). Quando penso a te che sei mio amico. Rodolfo Siviero e Giacomo Manzù (in Italian). Florence: Centro stampa Giunta Regione Toscana.
