= Diocesan Museum (Cortona) =

Coordinates: 43°16′34″N 11°59′03″E

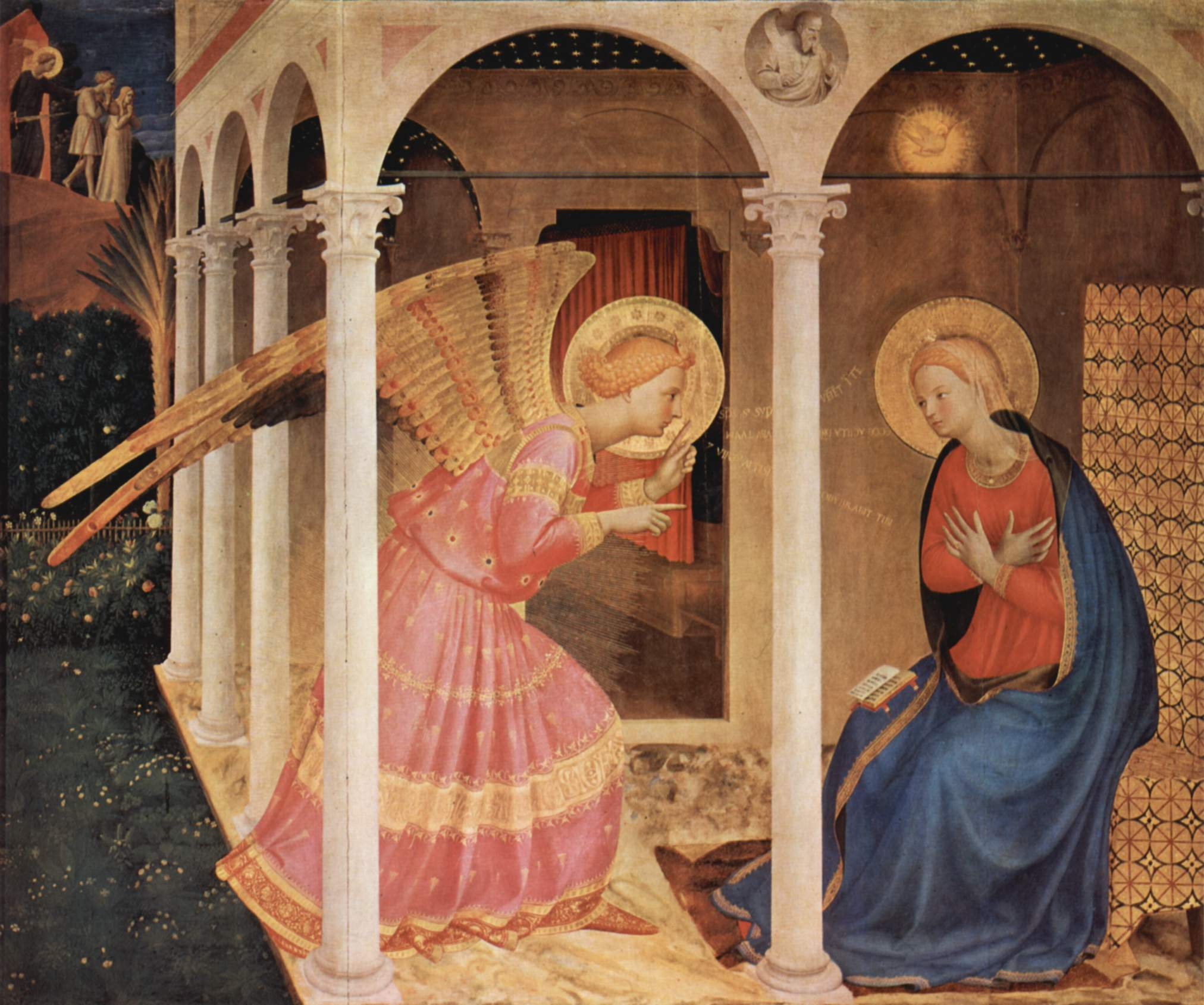
The Fra Angelico Annunciation (1433-34) at the museum.

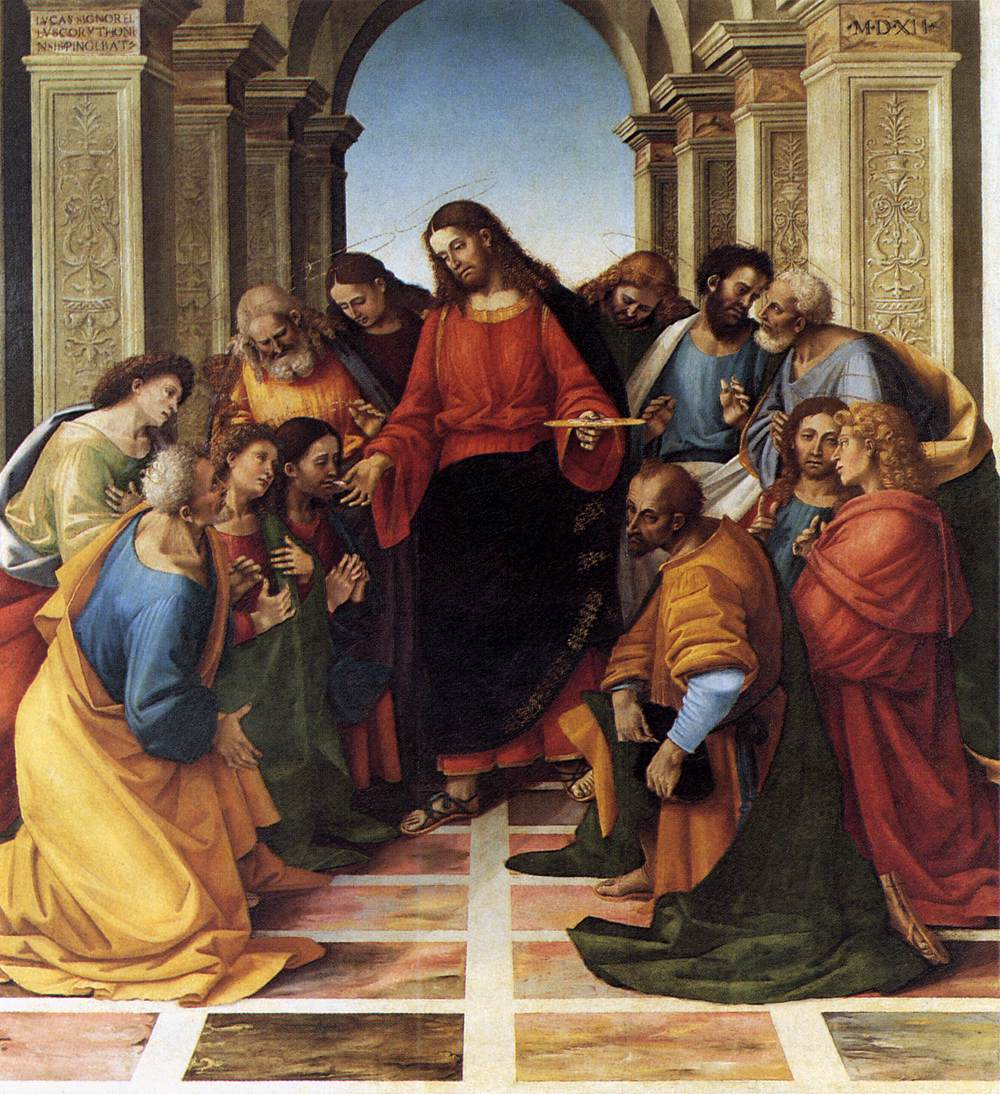
The Communion of the Apostles, by Luca Signorelli, 1512.

The Diocesan Museum in Cortona is an art museum in Cortona, Tuscany, Italy. Located on the former site of the local Church of Gesù, it houses works of art by artists such as Fra Angelico, Pietro Lorenzetti, Bartolomeo della Gatta, Luca Signorelli and Sassetta. The oldest item in the museum is a marble Roman sarcophagus (2nd century AD), depicting depicts the battle of Dionysus.

A room in the museum is specifically dedicated to the works of Luca Signorelli and his workshop, and emphasizes the bond between Signorelli and his hometown, and correspond to the artist's last years of work, from 1512 to 1523, the year of his death. Ten of the works bear the personal signature of Signorelli, the others are assumed to be from his workshop.

The large tempera on panel depiction of the Lamentation of Christ, which used to be in the church of S. Margaret of Cortona, was called "a rare form of art" by Giorgio Vasari. The predella, on which Girolamo Genga may have also worked displays scenes of the Passion such as of the Last Supper, Agony in the Garden, and the Flagellation of Christ. The Communion of the Apostles, by Signorelli, was painted for the high altar of the Church of Gesù, and has an unusual iconography in which the apostles are gathered around a table at the Last Supper, in a semicircle, standing or kneeling and around the figure of Christ. Only Judas, concealing his 30 pieces of silver faces the viewer, his glance revealing the inner struggle of betrayal. Another work attributed to Signorelli, or his workshop, is the 1519–1520 Assumption of the Virgin from the Cathedral of Cortona.

Other major art in the museum include:

- The Cortona Triptych by Fra Angelico
- Madonna and Child by Niccolò di Segna (c. 1336)
- A large cross painted by Pietro Lorenzetti (1315–1320, from the church of San Marco)
- Maestà by Pietro Lorenzetti
- Triptych of the Madonna of Humility with Saints by Sassetta (c. 1434)
- Assumption by Bartolomeo della Gatta (1470–1475)
- Ecstasy of St. Margaret of Cortona by Giuseppe Maria Crespi (1701)
