= Tabernacle of the Linaioli =

Painting by Fra Angelico in an aedicule by Lorenzo Ghiberti

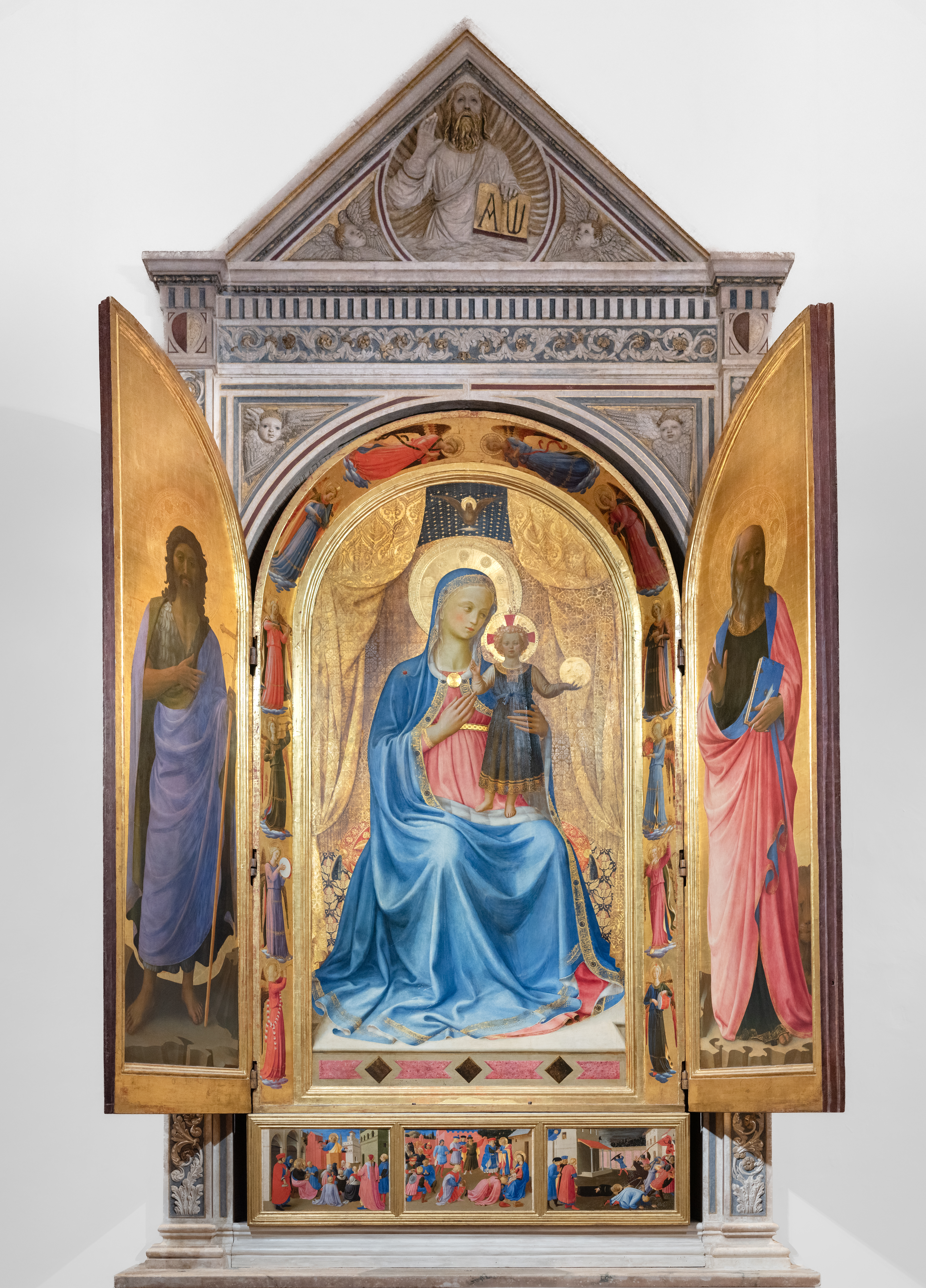
- Artist: Fra Angelico and Lorenzo Ghiberti
- Year: 1432–1435
- Medium: Tempera on panel
- Dimensions: 260 cm × 330 cm (100 in × 130 in)
- Location: National Museum of San Marco, Florence

The Tabernacle of the Linaioli (Italian: Tabernacolo dei Linaioli, literally "Tabernacle of the Linen manufacturers") is a marble aedicula designed by Lorenzo Ghiberti, with paintings by Fra Angelico, dating to 1432–1433. It is housed in the National Museum of San Marco, Florence, Italy.

== History ==
The tabernacle was commissioned for the exterior of the seat of the Linaioli (the guild of linen workers in Florence), in the former Old Market, in the October 1432. The marble parts were executed by Simone di Nanni da Fiesole, under design by Lorenzo Ghiberti. The contract for the internal paintings was signed by Angelico on 2 July 1433, for a total of 190 golden florins. The predella is generally dated to 1433–1435.

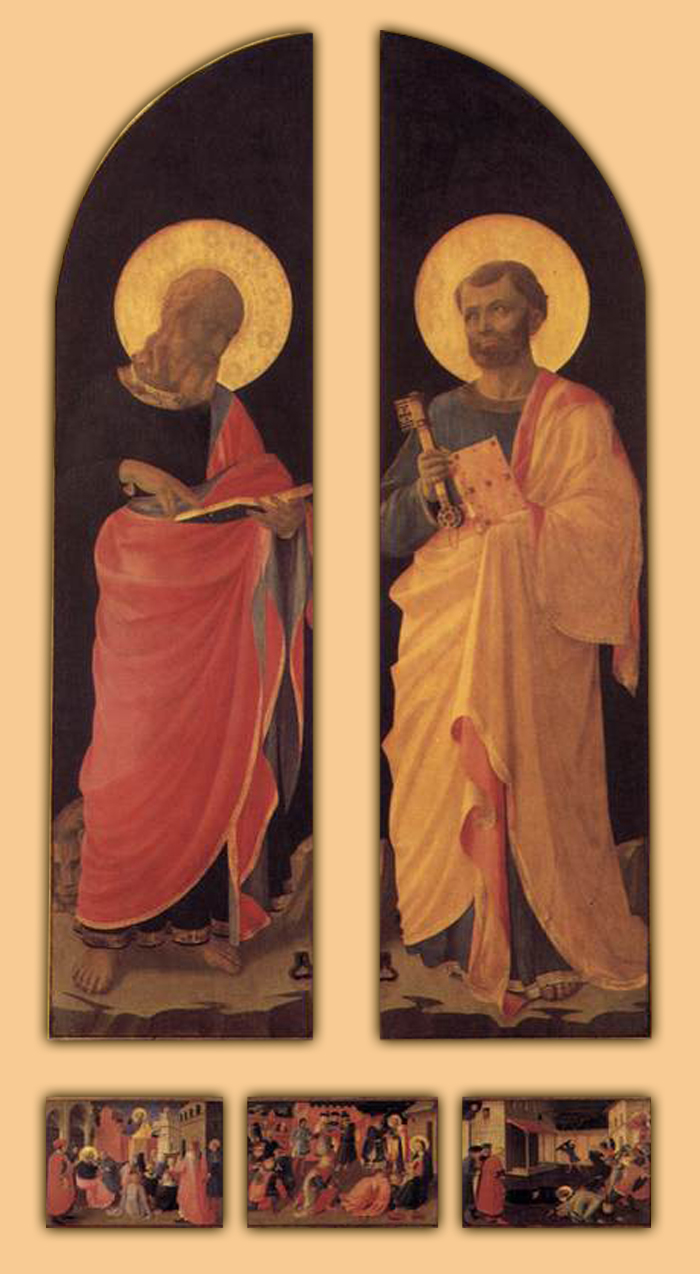
The closed tabernacle

The work was a large one, comparable only to Cimabue's Santa Trinita Maestà or Duccio di Buoninsegna's Rucellai Madonna. It has been speculated that the marble frame was sized according to a pre-existing painting, which was later replaced by Fra Angelico's, or that the size was inspired by that of the statues in Orsanmichele niches.

Work had been moved to the Palazzo della Borsa as early as 1777, together with other works commissioned by the city's guilds. In that year it was transferred to the Uffizi, whence it was transferred to the current location in 1924.

The tabernacle was restored in 2010.

== Description ==
The tabernacle is composed of a rectangular marble frame, with a triangular top with a sculpted almond depicting the "Blessing Christ and Cherubim". In the center, within an arched opening, are Fra Angelico's panel of the Maestà with twelve musician angels.

At the front are two shutter panels with further paintings of saints. These are, internally, John the Baptist (left) and John the Evangelist (right); and externally Mark the Evangelist (left) and Saint Peter (right). The panels are completed by a predella, placed below, with three scenes of St. Mark records the sermons of St. Peter, Adoration of the Magi and Martyrdom of St. Mark. The figure of Mark is recurrent due to his status as the patron of the corporation which commissioned the work.

The central panel, although damaged, has a style similar to Angelico's early works, with a marble step over which is the throne. Behind two draperies (perhaps a hint to the guild's textile activities) is a ceiling painted in blue with stars and the Holy Spirit dove, which is similar to Masolino's Annunciation in Washington, DC.

== Predella ==
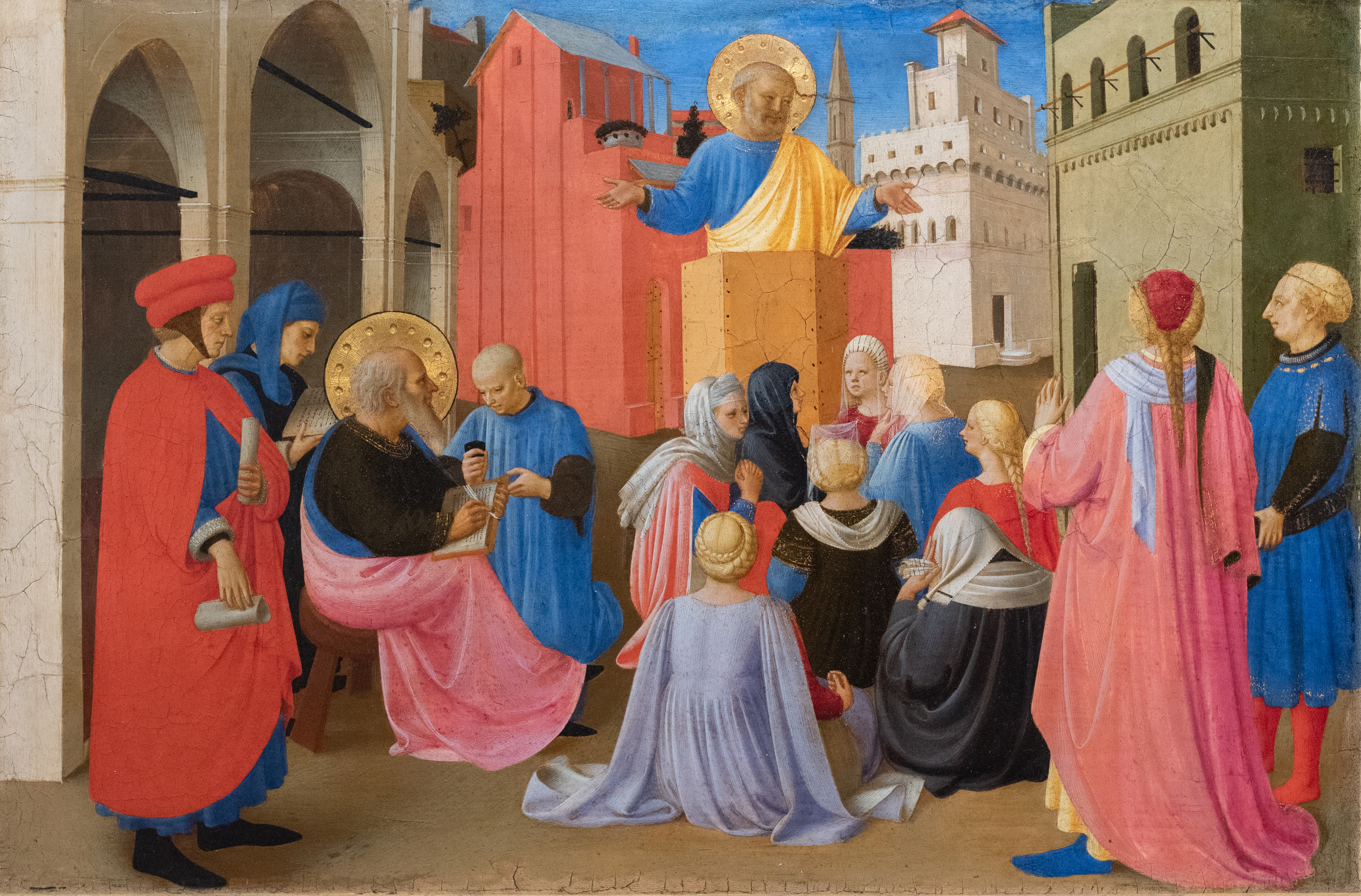
St Peter Preaching in the Presence of St Mark

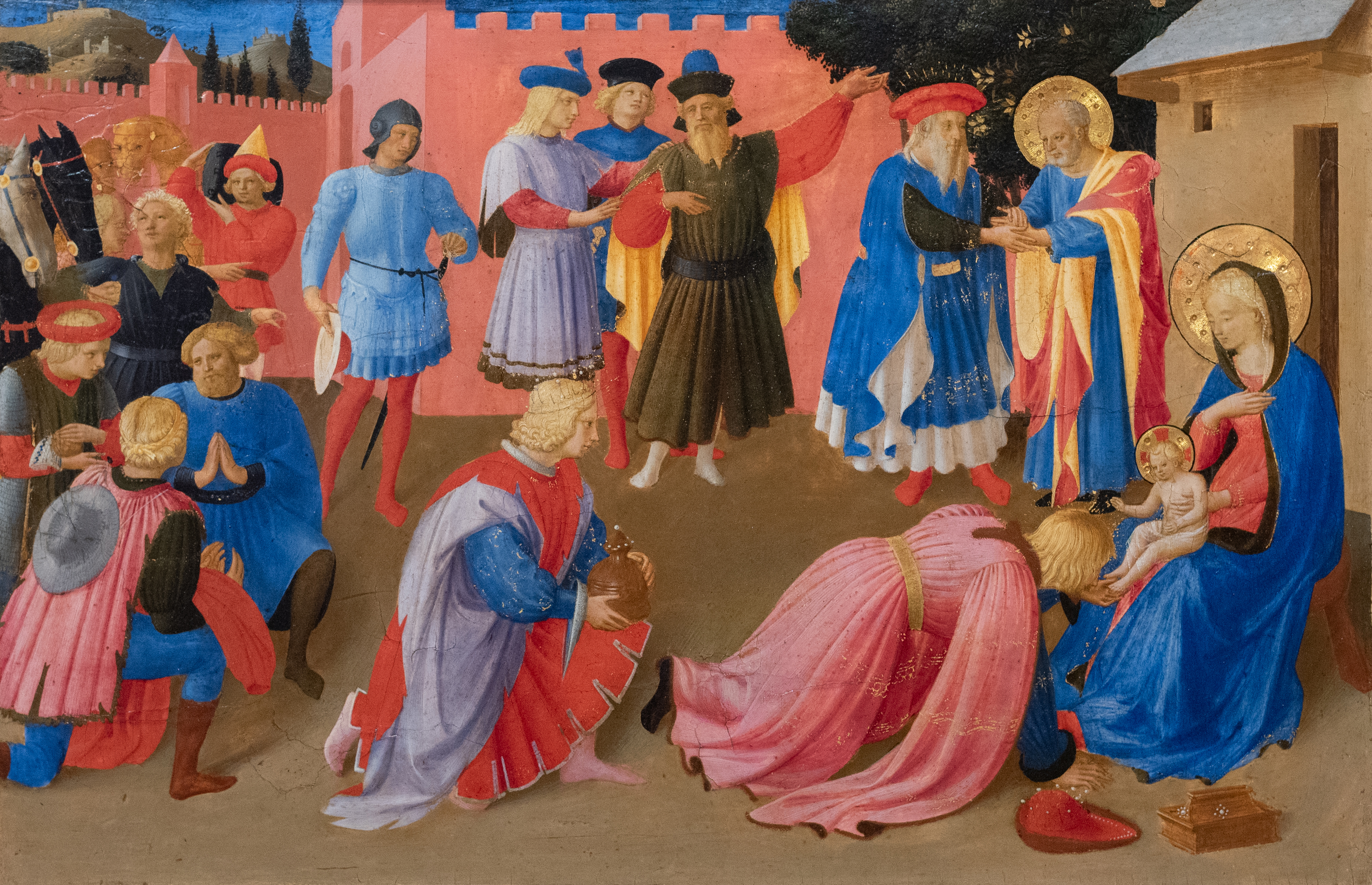
Adoration of the Magi

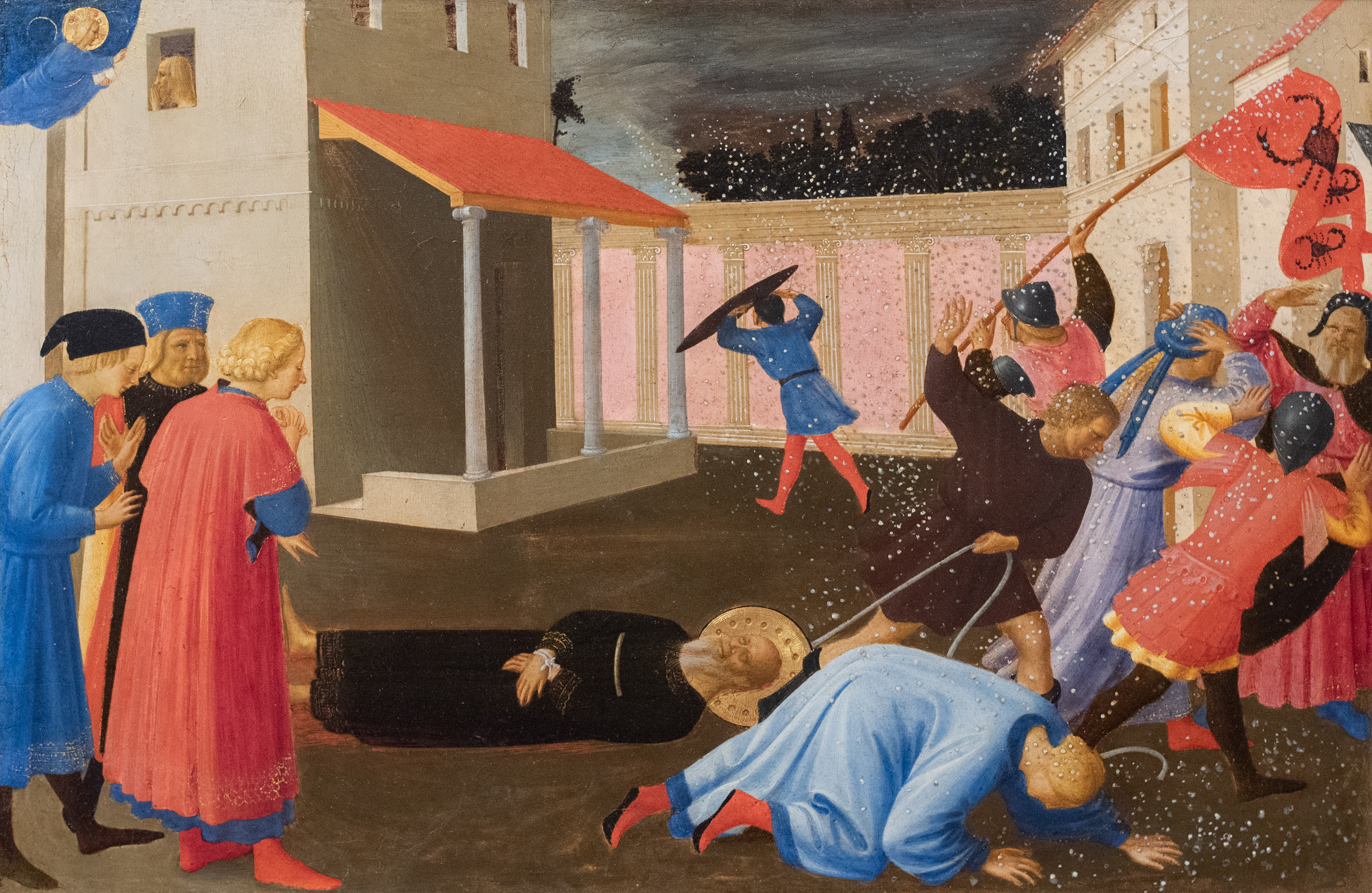
The Martyrdom of Saint Mark

== Sources ==
- Pope-Hennessy, John (1981). Beato Angelico. Florence: Scala.
