= Communion of the Apostles (Signorelli) =

Painting by Luca Signorelli

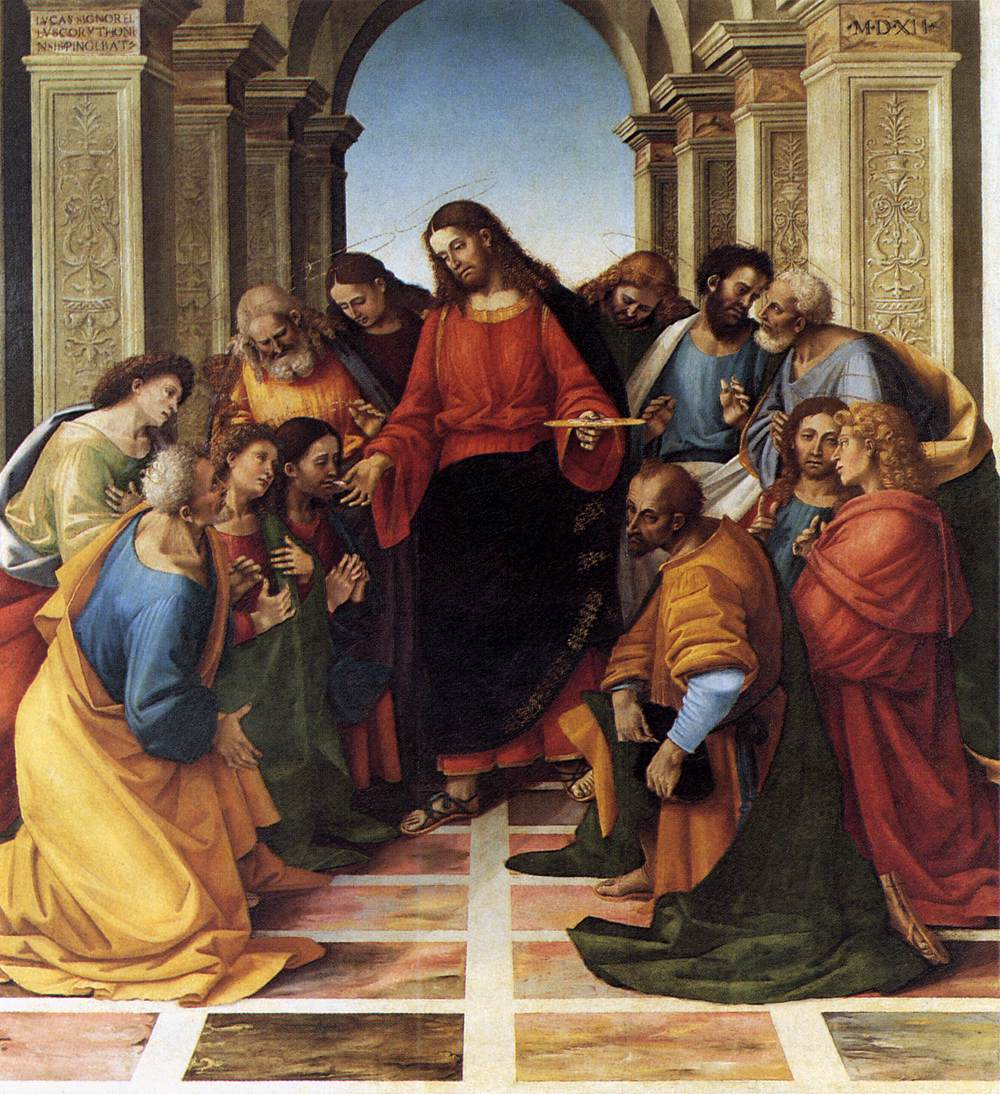
- Artist: Luca Signorelli
- Year: c. 1512
- Medium: Oil on panel
- Dimensions: 232 cm × 220 cm (91 in × 87 in)
- Location: Diocesan Museum, Cortona

The Communion of the Apostles is a painting by Italian Renaissance artist Luca Signorelli, dating from around 1512. It is now in the Diocesan Museum of Cortona, Tuscany, Italy.

== Description ==
The iconography of the painting was rather unusual for Italy, and had been indeed inspired by Justus van Gent's Corpus Domini Altarpiece (1472–1474), that Signorelli had seen during his stay at Urbino.

Above an ancient style background, similar to Perugino's works, Signorelli painted Christ in the center of the scene, surrounded by brightly dressed apostles in a pyramidal composition. Christ holds a dish with the hosts he is delivering them. Among the apostles, Judas Iscariot is portrayed while turning towards the seer: at the same time, he is hiding into his purse the coin of his betrayal.

The altarpiece was most likely accompanied by a predella. Three of its panels have been identified with the Meeting of the Pilgrims on the Road to Emmaus and Supper in Emmaus in the Julius Weitznel collection, and with the St. Catherine of Alexandria now at the Museo Horne in Florence.

== Sources ==
- Paolucci, Antonio (2004). "Luca Signorelli". Pittori del Rinascimento, Scala. Florence. ISBN 888117099X.
