= Cortona Triptych =

Triptych painted by Fra Angelico

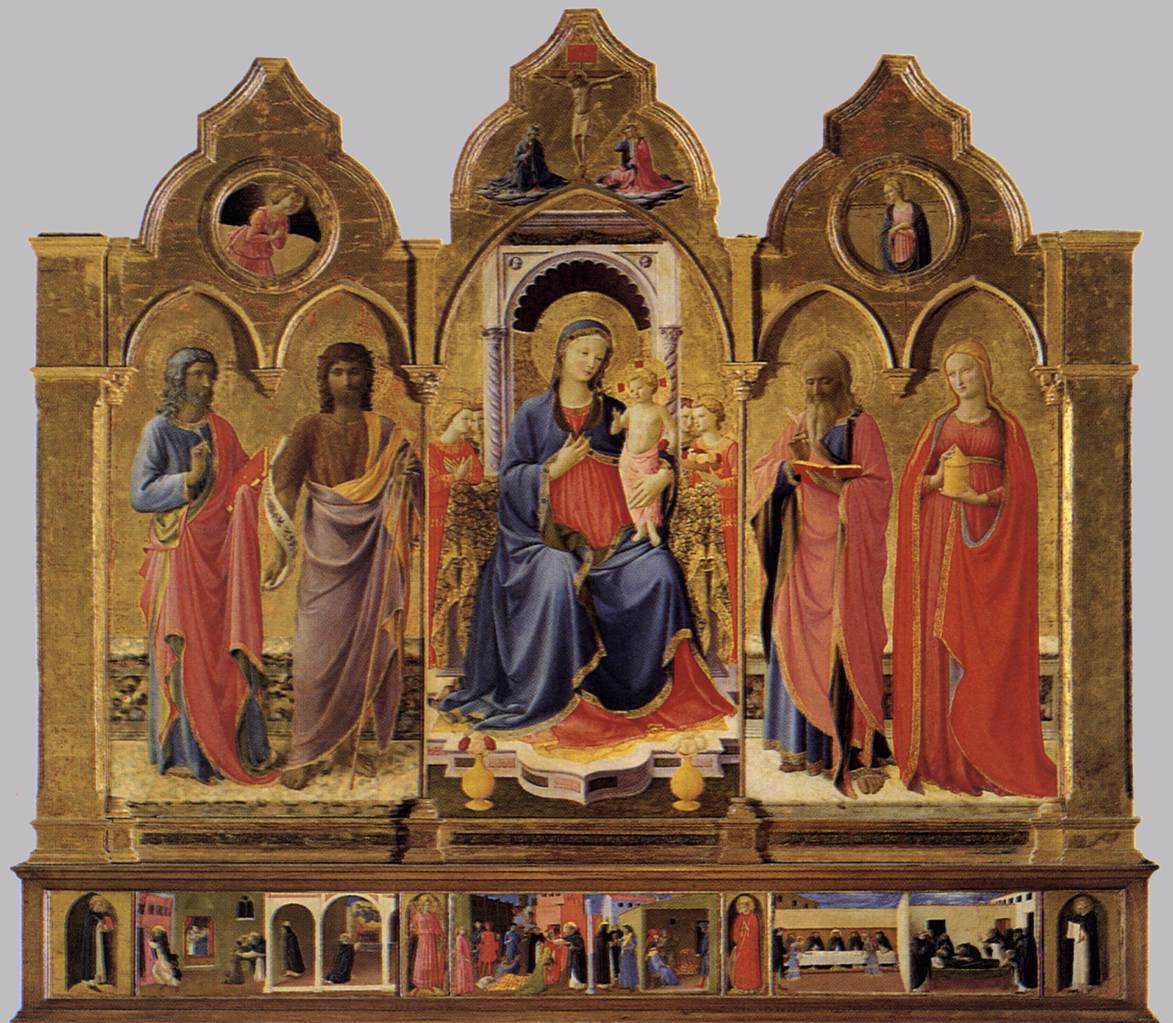
Cortona Triptych by Fra Angelico

The Cortona Triptych is a triptych altarpiece of the Madonna and Child with saints, painted by Fra Angelico. It is now in the Diocesan Museum in Cortona, Italy. The painting dates from 1436–1437.

The triptych was originally painted for the church of San Domenico in Cortona, which belonged to the Order of Saint Dominic. It was painted in Fiesole, and then shipped to Cortona, probably just before Fra Angelico painted the Perugia Altarpiece in 1437, with which this work shares many common elements.

== Predella ==
The predella depicts the story of Saint Dominic along with other saints:

- Saint Peter Martyr
- The dream of Innocent III,
- Saint Michael the Archangel
- Resurrection of Napoleone Orsini
- Saint Vincent, Martyr
- Saint Dominic with the Friars, being served by the Angels and Death of St. Dominic
- Saint Thomas Aquinas
The Predella of the triptych

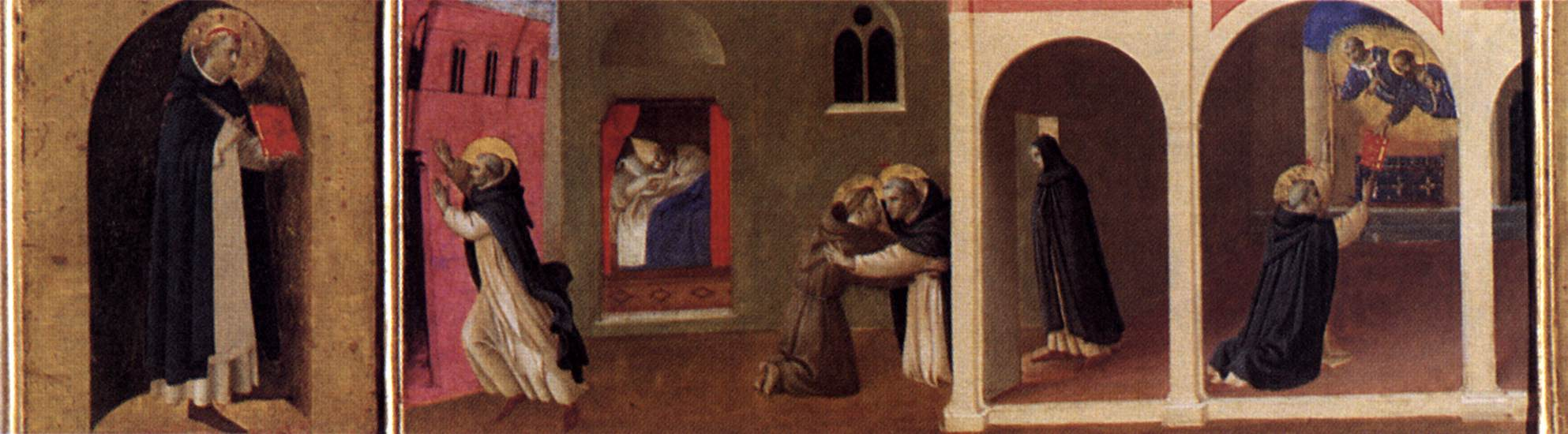

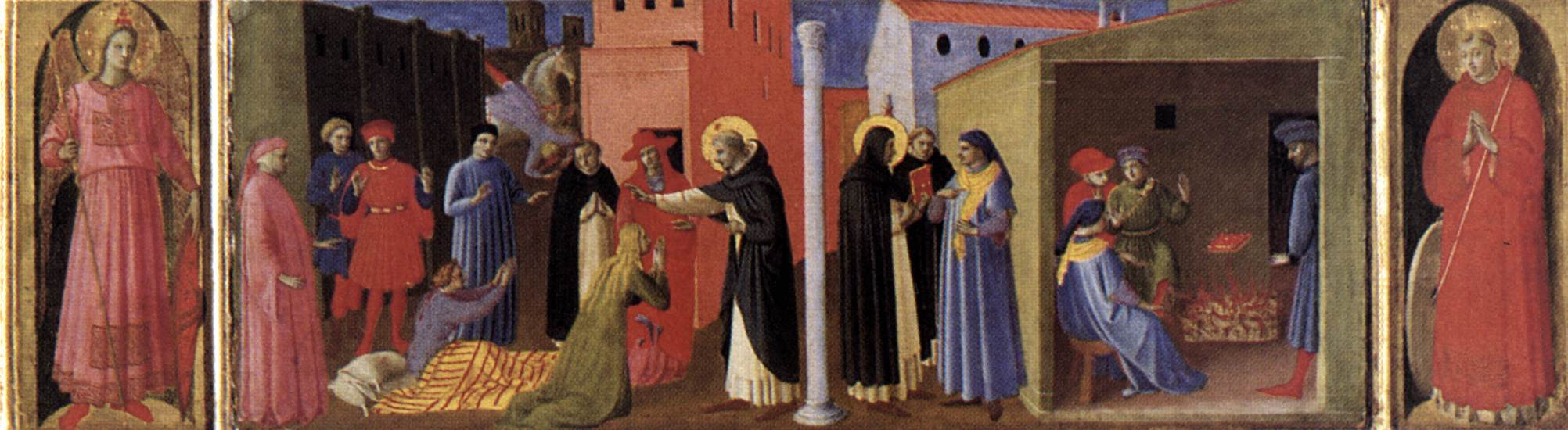

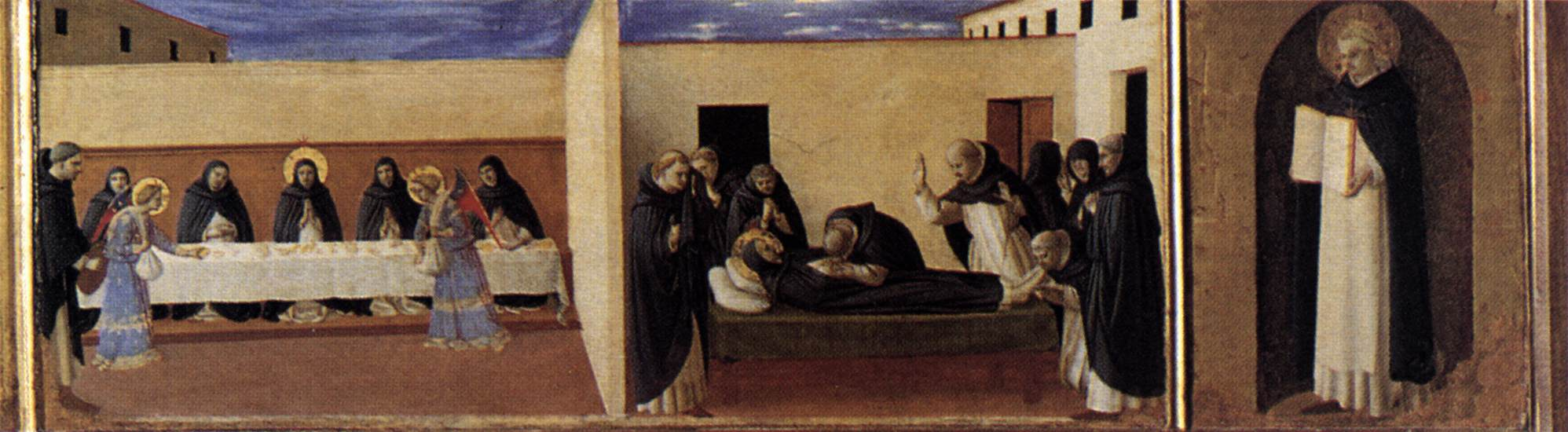
