= Annunciation (Fra Angelico, Madrid) =

Altarpiece by Fra Angelico

- Annunciazione (Italian)
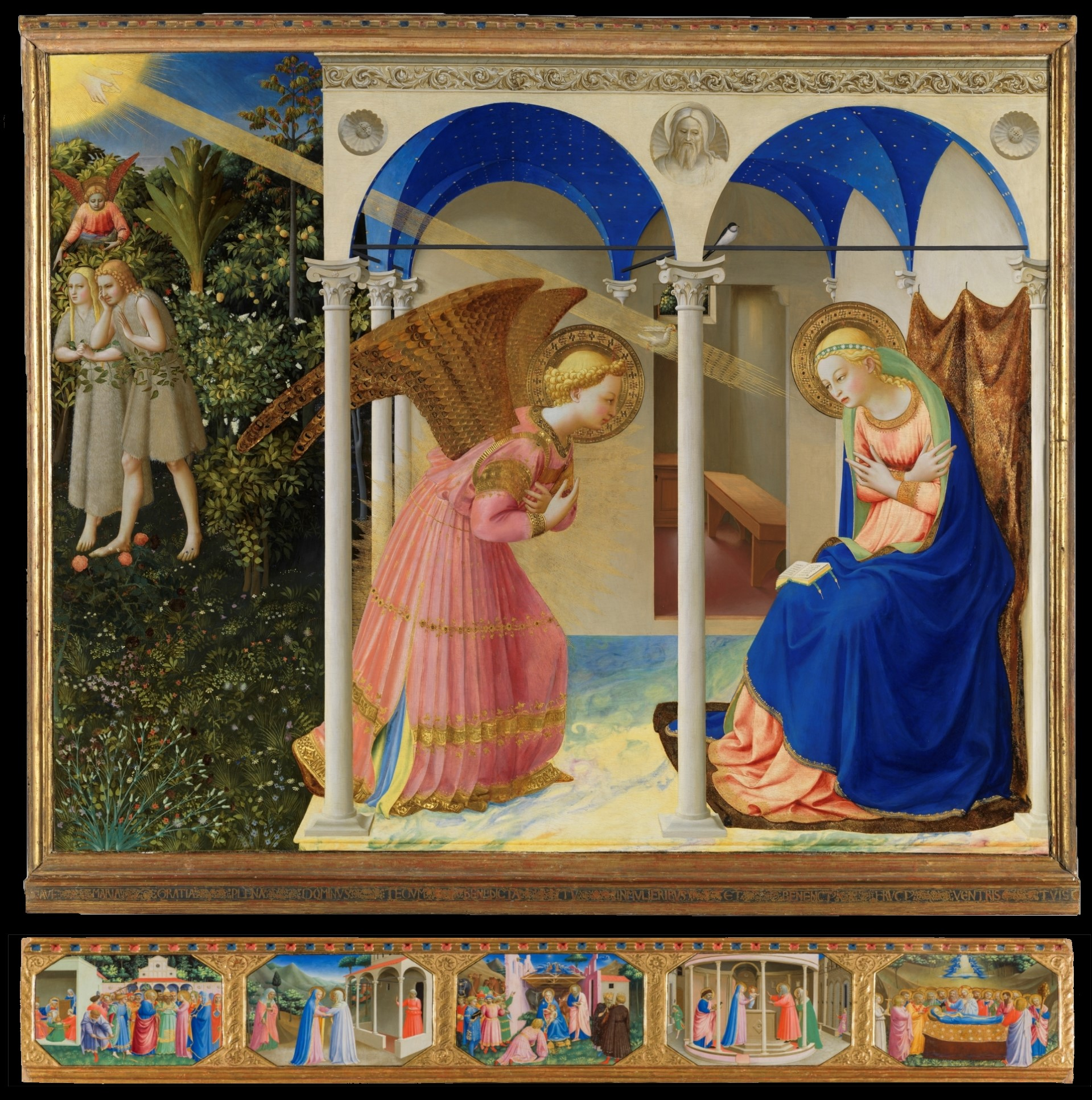
- Artist: Fra Angelico
- Year: c. 1426
- Medium: Tempera on panel
- Dimensions: 391 cm × 493 cm (154 in × 194 in)
- Location: Museo del Prado, Madrid

The Prado Annunciation is an altarpiece painted by the Italian Renaissance painter Giovanni da Fiesole, known as Fra Angelico, in the 1420s. It is one of his best-known works. Originally destined for the convent of the observant Dominicans of Fiesole, the painting is currently in the collection of the Museo del Prado in Madrid. It is one of three altarpieces by Fra Angelico representing the Annunciation; the other two being the Cortona Annunciation and the Annunciation of San Giovanni Valdarno. The sequence in which the three works were painted is not certain, but the general art historical consensus places the Prado version first.

== History ==
The work was painted for a side altar in the Convent of San Domenico, Fiesole, where Fra Angelico was a friar. For the same church he also contributed the main altarpiece, showing the Virgin and Child Enthroned with Dominican saints (c. 1425) and the Coronation of the Virgin, now in the Louvre (c. 1424–1435) .

The Annunciation remained at San Domenico until 1611 when it was sold to the King of Spain and taken to Madrid, where it became part of the royal collections of the Spanish monarchy before moving to Prado.

== Description ==
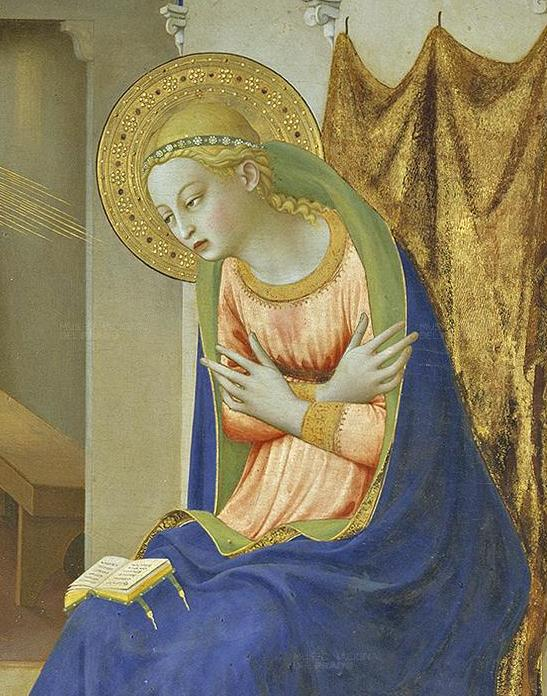
The Virgin (detail)

The scenes have a structure similar to the other two Annunciations but with some differences. As in the Annunciation of Cortona, the pictured surface is divided in three parts (the garden, the Angel's arch and the Virgin's arch), but the vanishing point is inside the home, as in the Annunciation of San Giovanni, focusing the viewer's attention on the Annunciation. This scheme draws attention away from the figures of Adam and Eve expelled from Eden, which in the Cortonese Annunciation are smaller but are near the vanishing point.

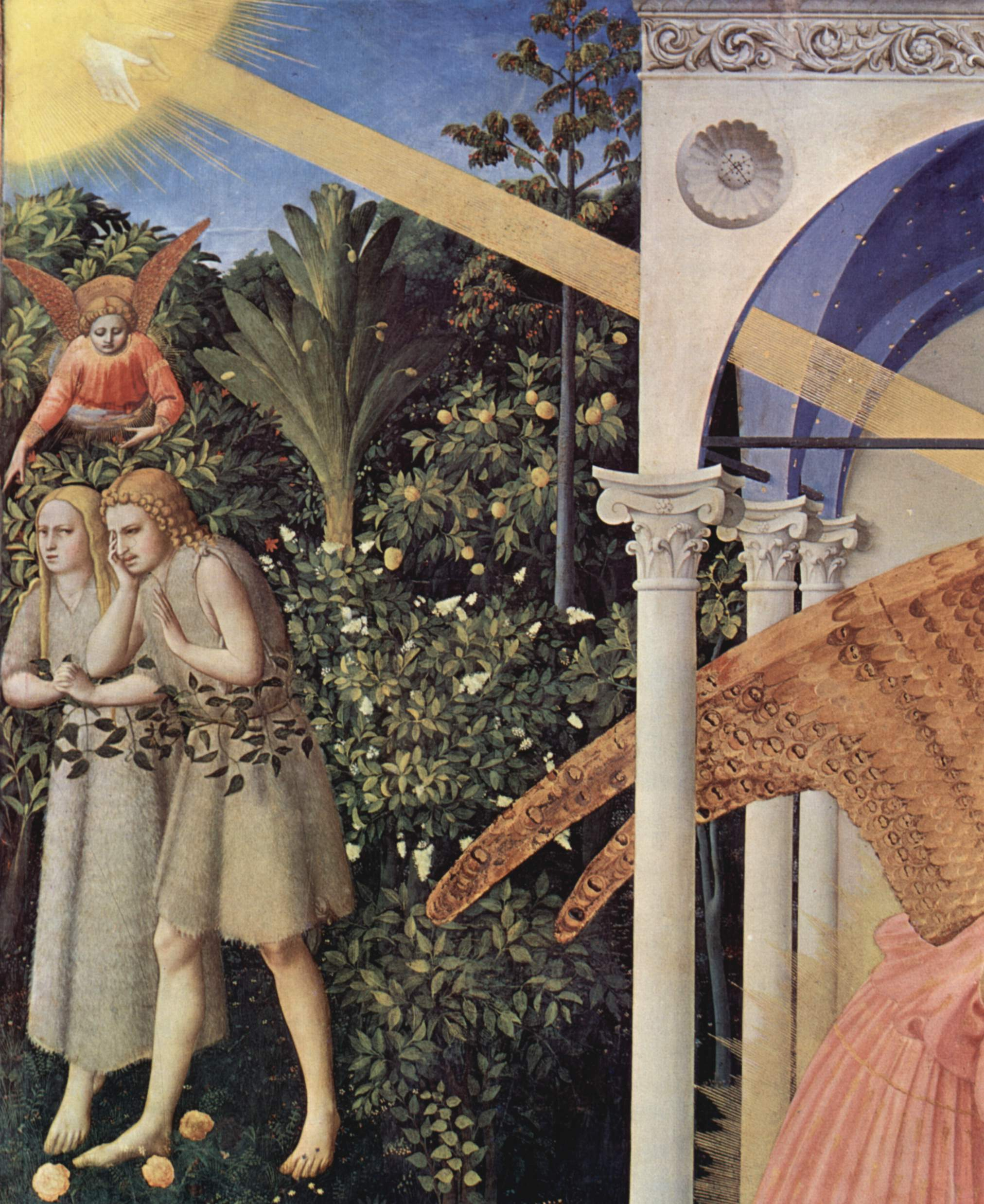
Detail: Adam and Eve hunted out of Paradise "walking on the roses of the garden of Mary"

As in the other two works, they are moving in a flowered garden representing the virginity of Mary ("hortus conclusus"), inhabited by a multitude of plants and seedlings painted with great accuracy. Between the species with symbolic values, we can recognise the palm, representing the future martyrdom of Christ, and the red roses referring the blood of the Passion. The presence of Adam and Eve evidences the cycle of the human damnation, recomposed with the deliverance in Christ made possible by the acceptance of Mary.

From the high-left a ray of divine light illuminates, through the dove of Holy Spirit, the Virgin, who bends accepting her duty submissively. She's sitting on a seat covered with a rich drape acting as carpet, and she has on her knees an open book, symbol of the happening Scriptures.

The Angel has a similar pose and vest to the work of San Giovanni, although his figure appears more static and the folds of the vest are more schematic, and may be the work of a collaborator.

The scene is set under a Renaissance portico with the light arches stretched with wisdom on perspective, which remember the architecture of Michelozzo. Light appears unified, unlike the pail of Cortona, and moves from left to right for all the element.

== Predella ==
In the predella there are five scenes from Mary's life ( Birth and Marriage, the Visitation, the Adoration of the Magi, Presentation at the temple and the dormition) where the master had worked freely on the composition, less subjected to the iconographic tradition of the main scene.

The Sposalizio presents the background of a Renaissance church with portico, while the visitation shows a sidelong lodge, represented with ability. This scene does not reach the vivid expression of fatigue on the woman who is going to the chime as in the predella of the Annunciation of Cortona. The Adoration of the Magi instead is completely original and shows an innovative frontal iconography years before the revolution of Botticelli (Adoration of the Magi in the Uffizi, 1475), enhanced by the complex perspective of the hut's ruins. Here can be noticed the distinct use of lights by Beato Angelico, who creates a pure and crystal illumination which models volumes, enhances the chromatic harmony and unifies the scenes.

The following scene of the Presentation is more innovative, with the ambient placed inside a circular temple which seems projected through lens to the viewer, improving the scheme already used on the Presentation at the Temple by Gentile da Fabriano. The Dormition is the most traditional scene though the invention of the avvallamento between the background mountains can be considered innovative, because it creates a perspective channel to the holy way suspended by the Angels on the top.

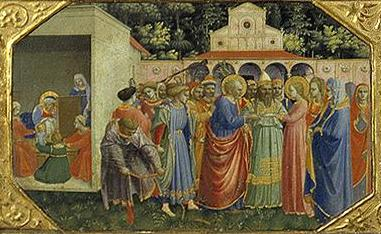
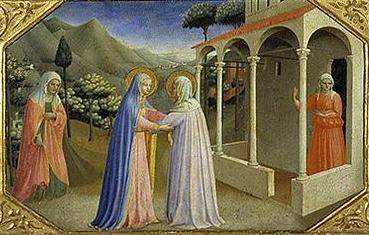
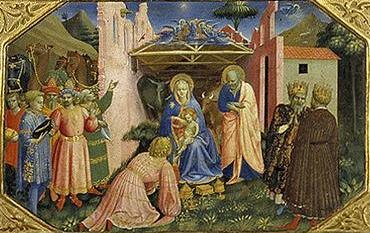
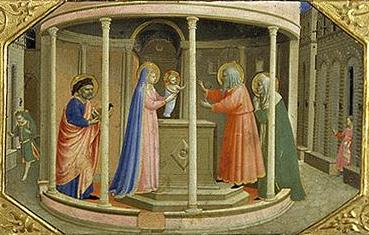
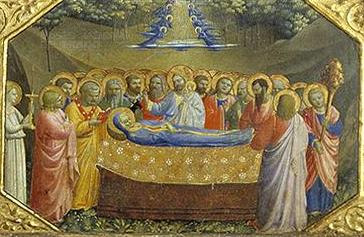
Predella of the Pala of the Prado's Annunciation

== Bibliography ==
- Angelico Venturino Alce, Angelicus pictor: vita, opere e teologia del Beato Angelico, Edizioni Studio Domenicano, 1993. ISBN 88-7094-126-4
- Guido Cornini, Beato Angelico, Giunti, Firenze 2000 ISBN 88-09-01602-5
