= San Domenico, Perugia =

Coordinates: 43°06′24″N 12°23′30″E

Basilica of San Domenico
- Basilica di San Domenico
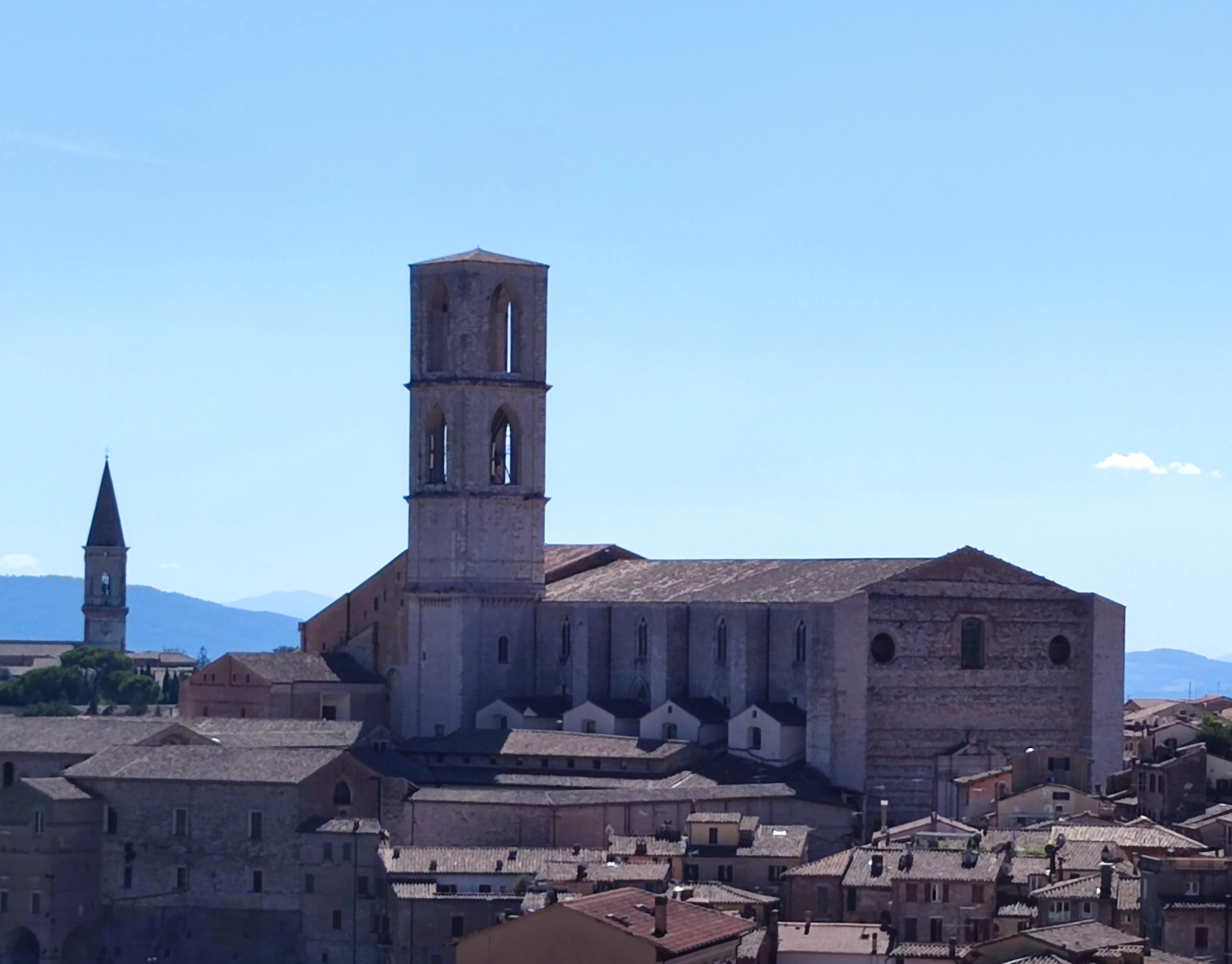
- The cathedral seen from the Covered Market of Perugia
- Basilica of San Domenico
- Location: Perugia, Umbria
- Country: Italy
- Denomination: Roman Catholic

History
- Status: Minor basilica

Architecture
- Architect: Giovanni Pisano
- Architectural type: Church
- Style: Gothic, Renaissance, Baroque
- Groundbreaking: 1304
- Completed: 1632

Administration
- Archdiocese: Perugia-Città della Pieve

San Domenico is a Roman Catholic basilica church, located on Piazza Giordano Bruno and via del Castellano in the city of Perugia, region of Umbria, central Italy.

== Description ==
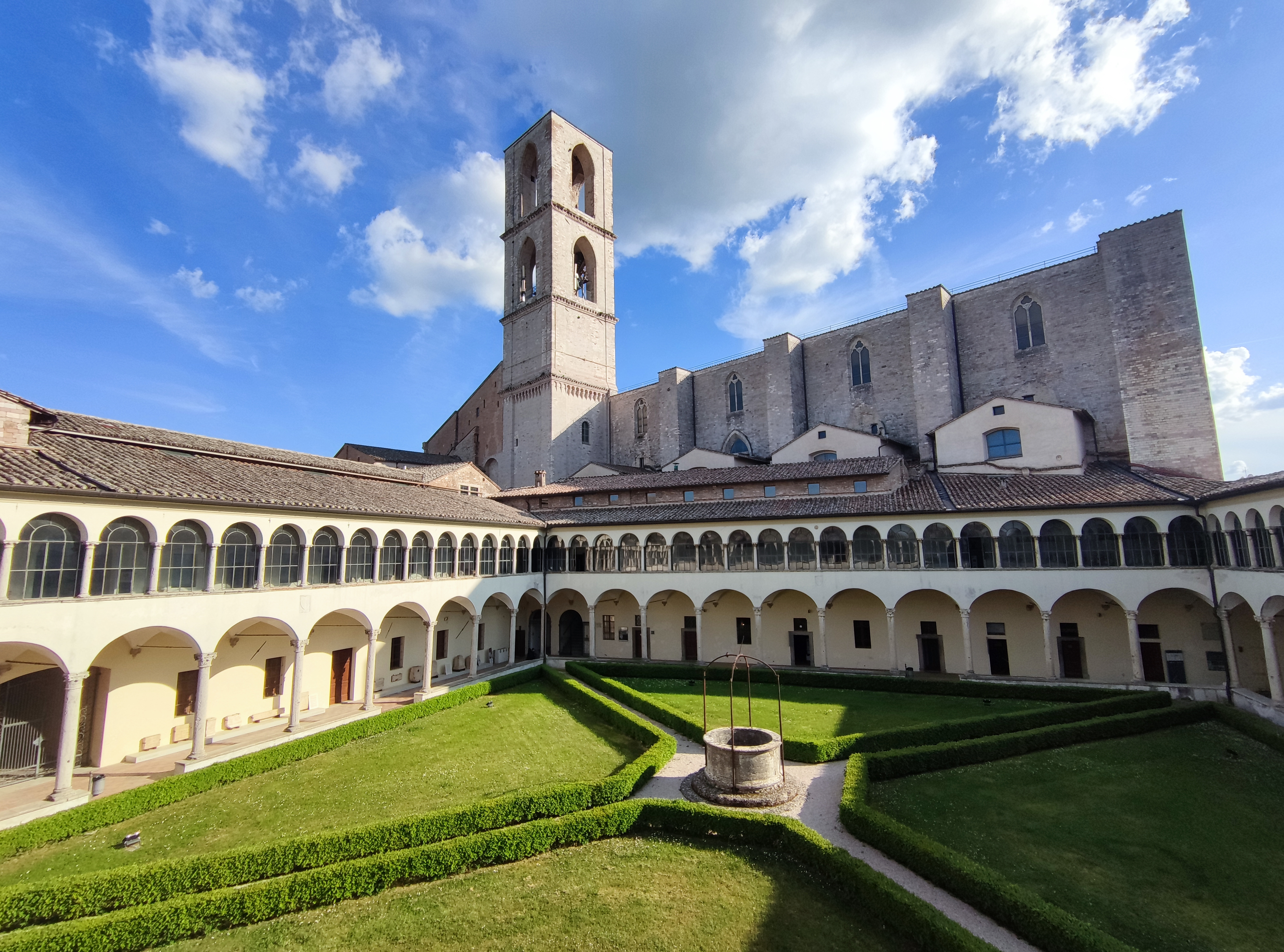
Cloister of the basilica

A church, titled the Pieve di Santo Stefano del Castellare, was present at the site since about the 5th century. Construction of the precursor to the present church, also known as San Domenico Vecchio, began in 1304, and was constructed over the pre-existing church which had become inadequate after the growth of the Dominican Order. According to Giorgio Vasari, it was designed by Giovanni Pisano. That church was consecrated in 1459, and had a layout that resembled the northern-European Hallenkirche plans.

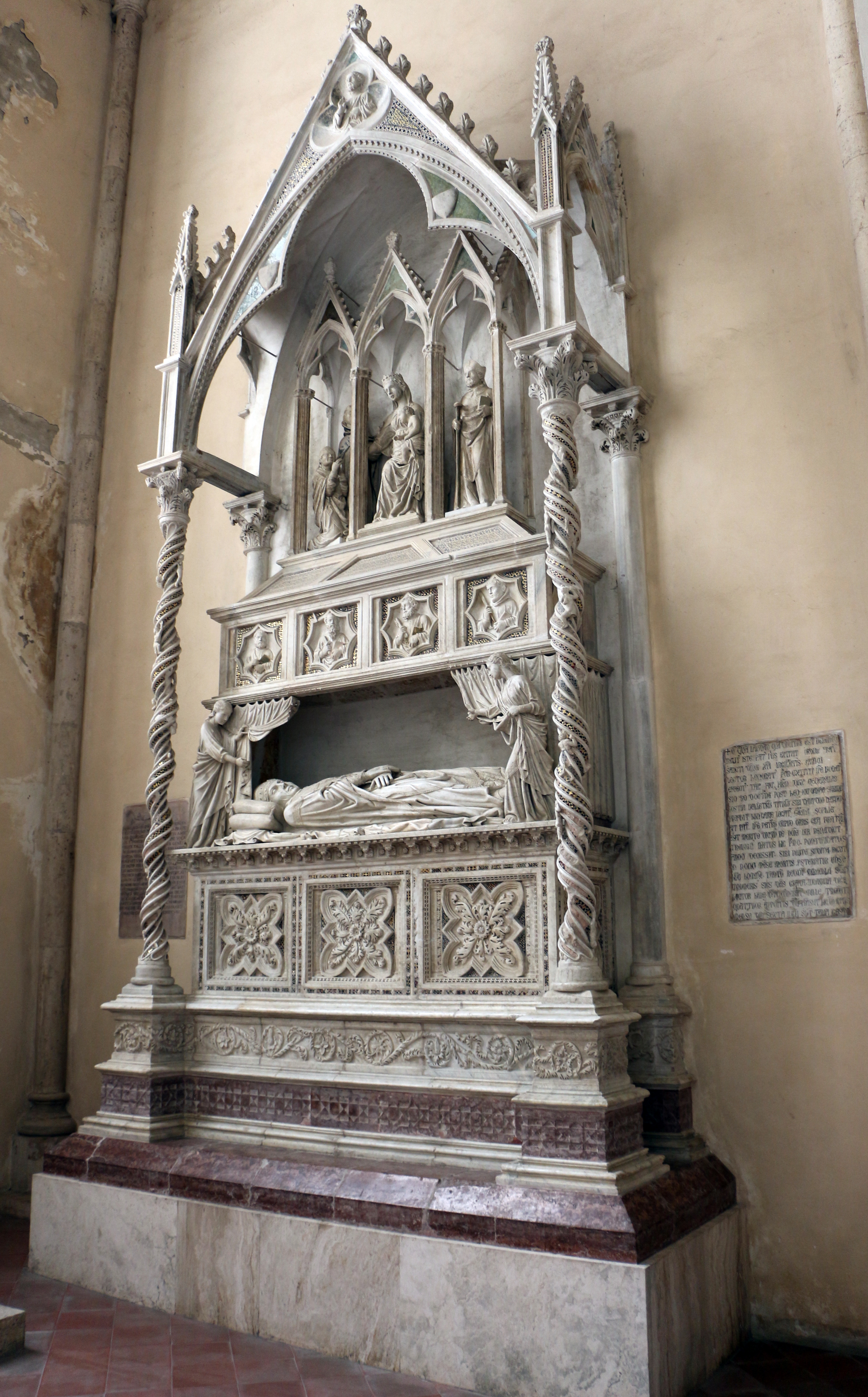
Funerary monument to Benedict XI.

By 1614–1615, the San Domenico Vecchio church was dilapidated, showing structural problems, and threatening collapse. New plans for refurbishment were implemented. The church façade retains a late 16th-century portal and is now double Baroque staircase. The interior was renovated in 1629–1632 by Carlo Maderno, and shows similarities with Maderno's design of the nave of St Peter's in Rome, except San Domenico has small lateral windows.

Of the prior San Domenico church, some fragments remain: the cloister (1455–1579), the chapel of St Catherine, and a large Gothic rose window (21 x 8.5 m) near the choir, executed by Bartolomeo di Pietro and Mariotto di Nardo in 1411. This window is also shown in a fresco now in the Palazzo dei Priori of Perugia. The bell tower, constructed between 1464 and 1500 by the Lombard architect Gasperino di Antonio, originally stood at a remarkable height of 126 meters, but it was later reduced for stability reasons. However, its current height is 60 meters. It features two tiers of Gothic windows, with the upper tier being lighter in design than the lower one. Originally, they were all adorned with marble tracery, of which only one remains, reconstructed in 1949 using the original materials.

Over the centuries, some of the movable artwork inside the church was removed. It still contains the 14th-century funerary monument to Pope Benedict XI, who died at Perugia in 1304 (perhaps sculpted by a pupil of Arnolfo di Cambio). It still has the altar (1459) of the Chapel of the Rosary by Agostino di Duccio and wooden choir-stalls, dating to the late 14th century. The church once housed also the Perugia Altarpiece (Guidalotti Polyptych) by Fra Angelico, now in the Galleria Nazionale dell'Umbria. The Chapel of St Catherine has 14th and 15th-century frescoes.

The annexed cloister houses the National Archaeological Museum of Umbria, with pre-historic, Roman and Etruscan items excavated in Umbria.

Chapel of the Angels with votive frescoes from the 14th and 15th centuries AD.

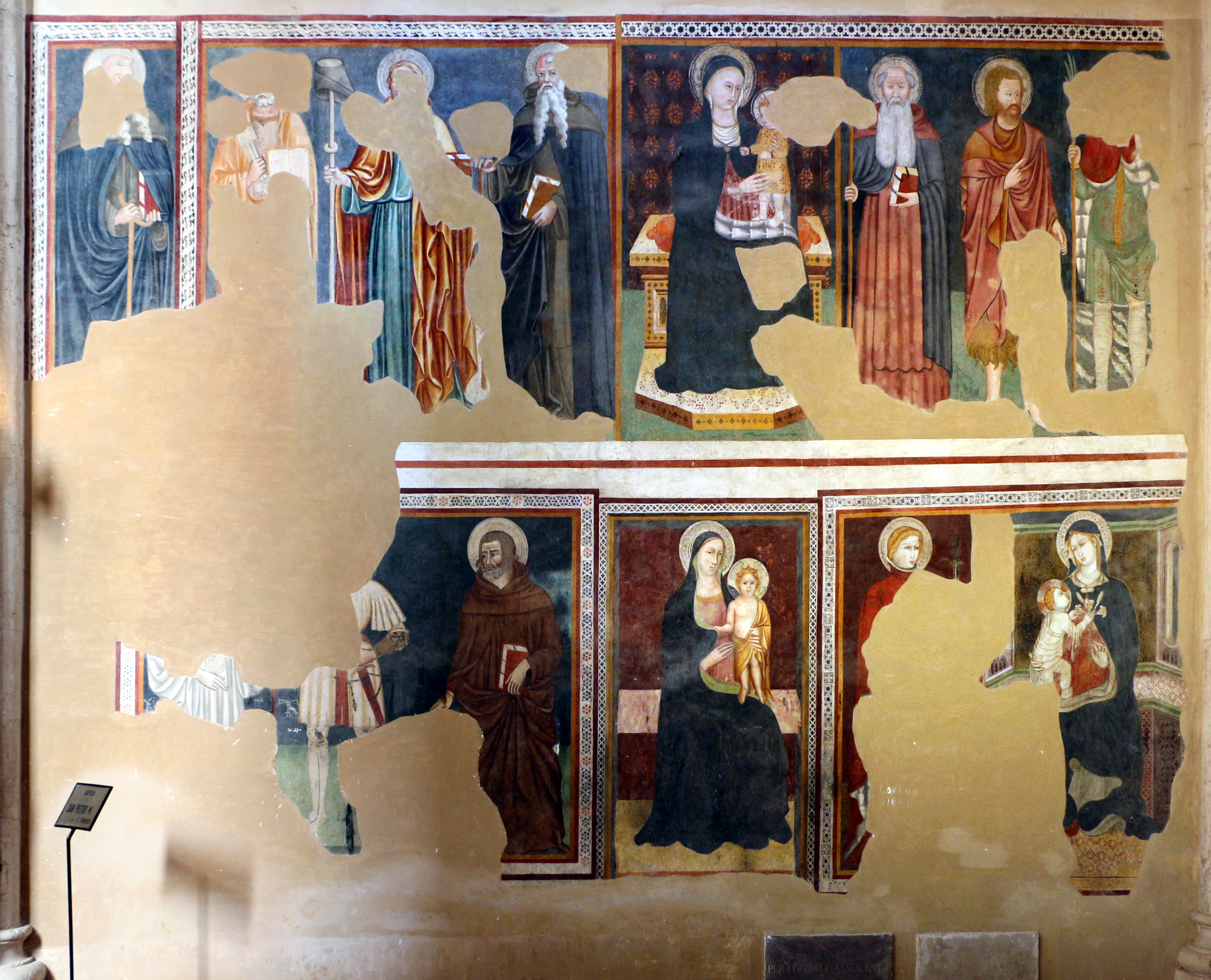

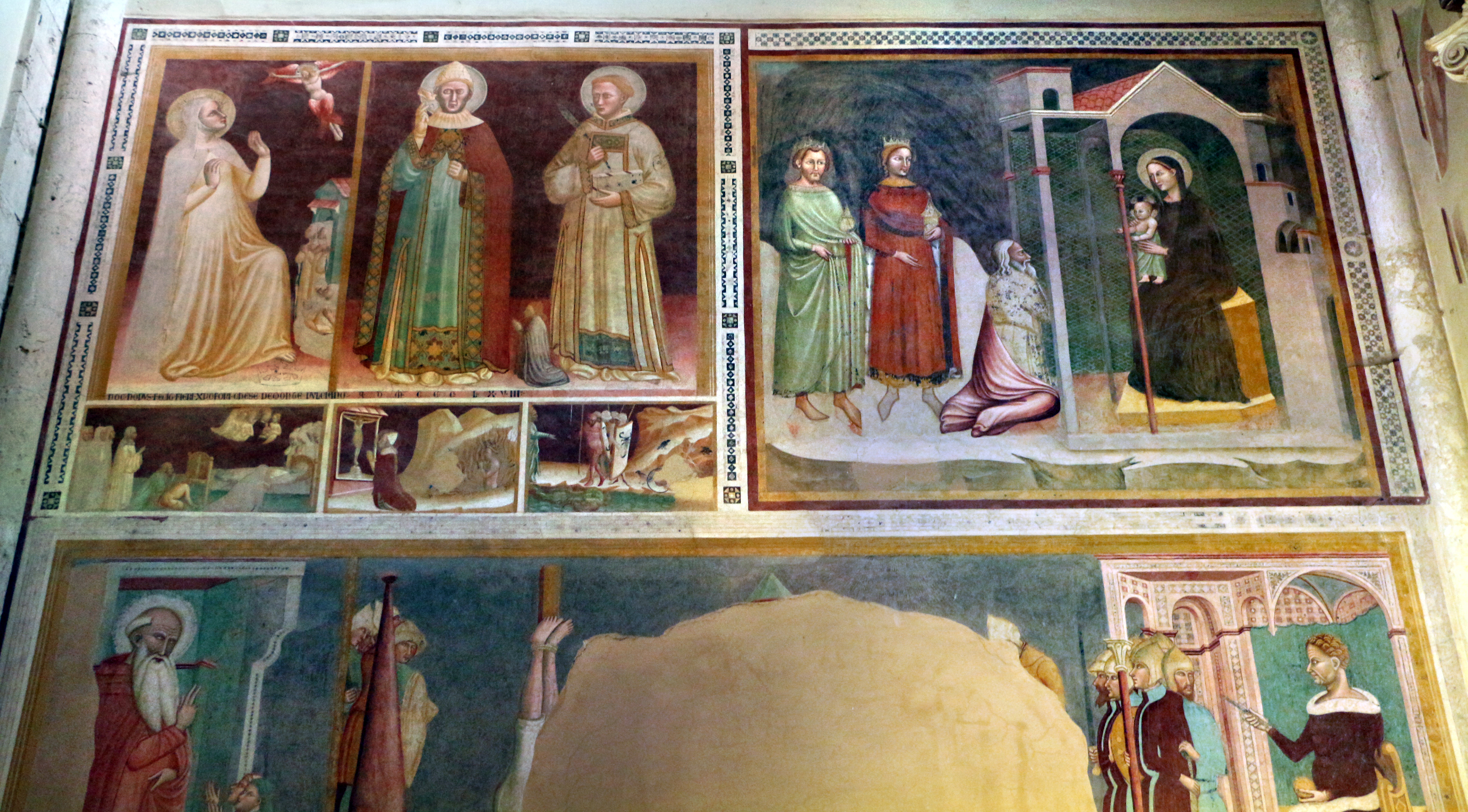

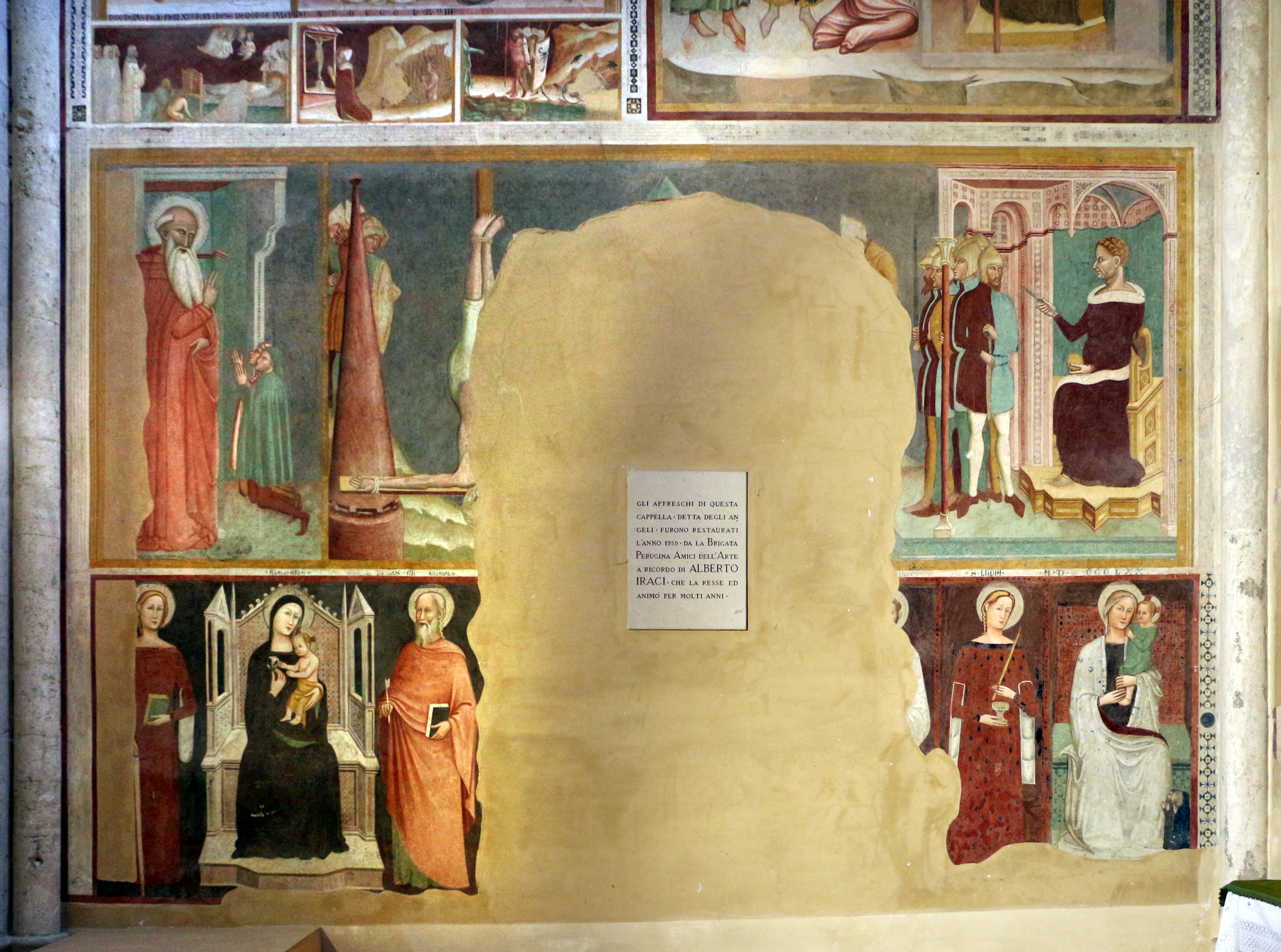

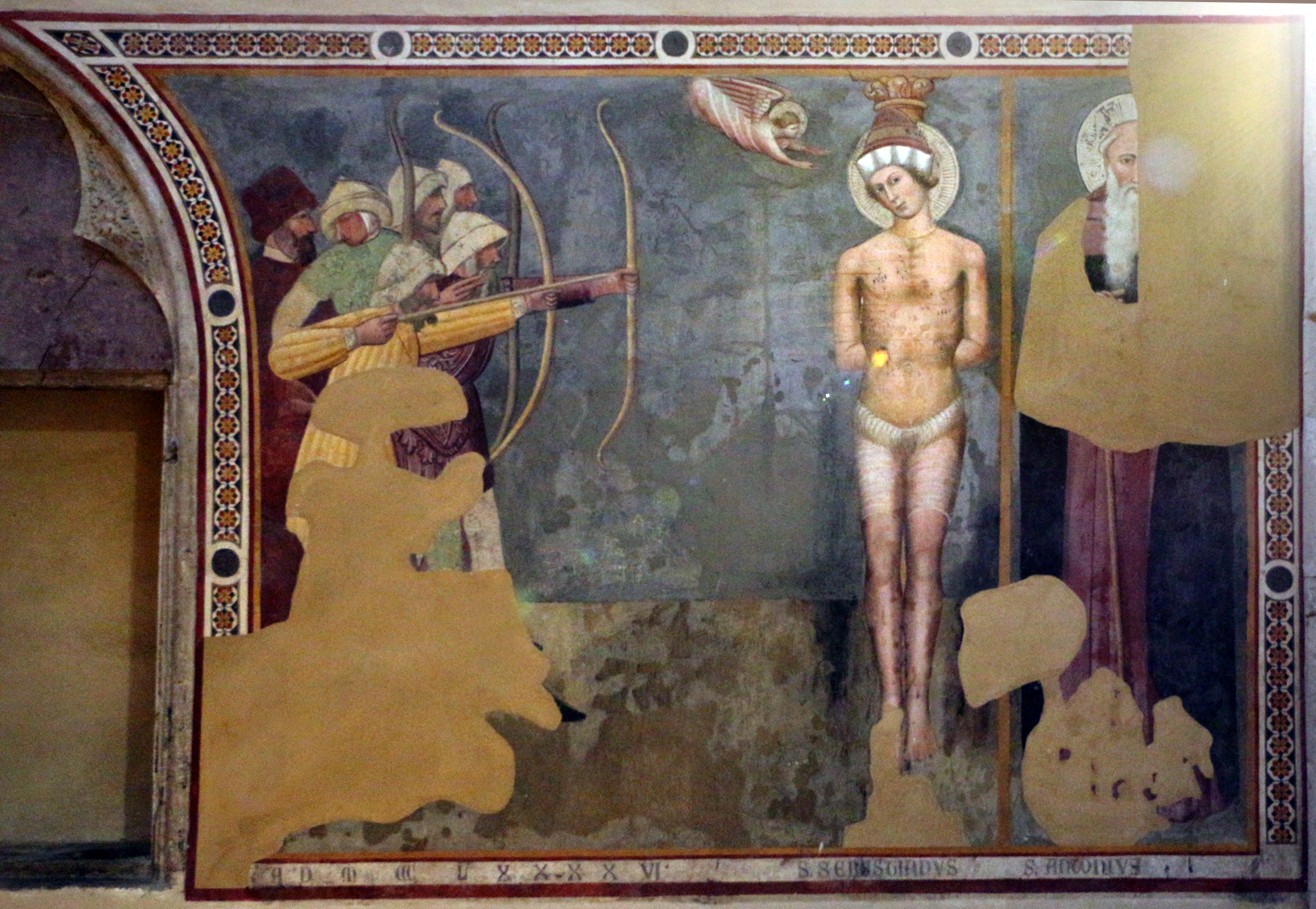

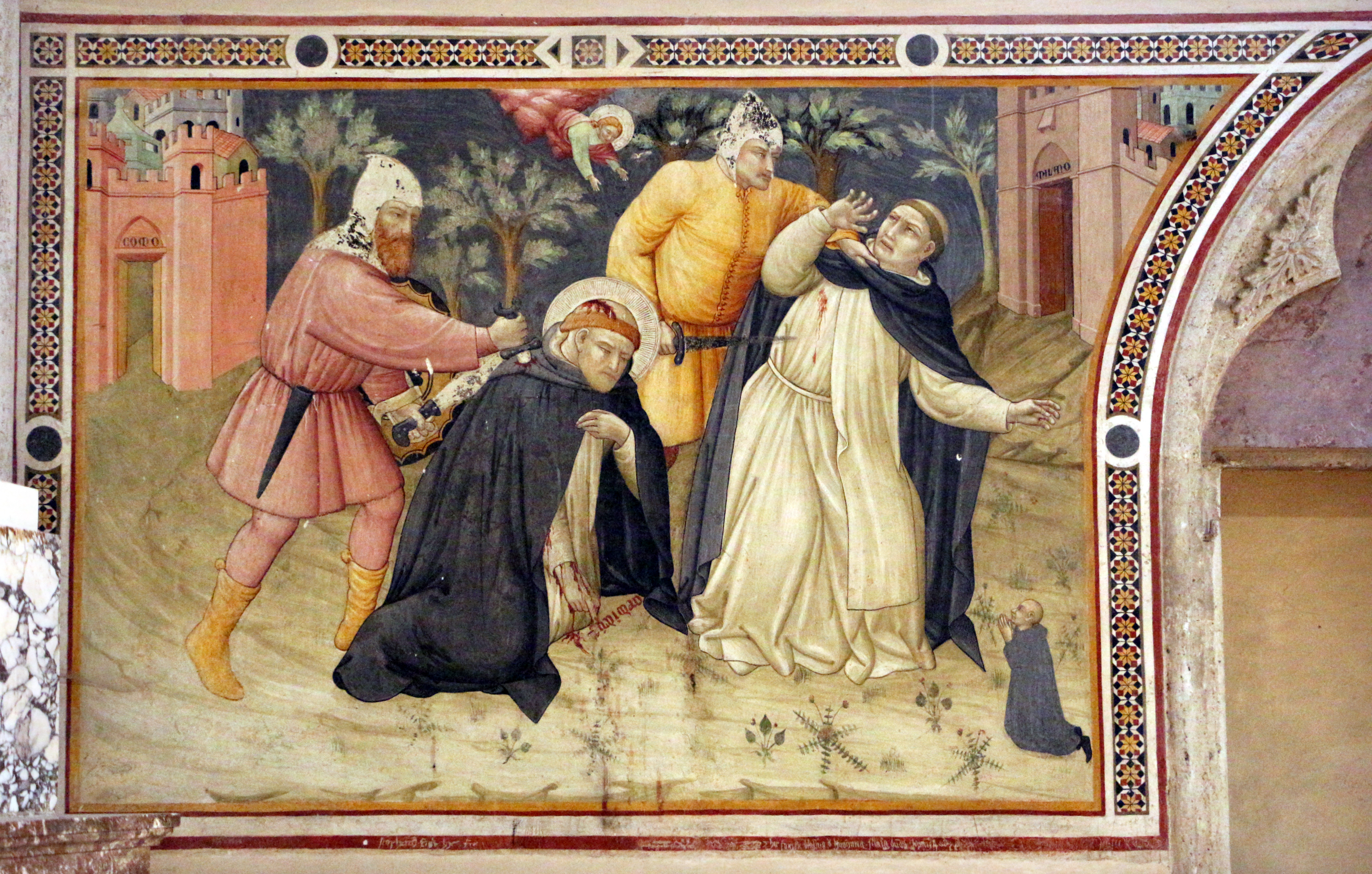

== Sources ==
- Mancini, Francesco Federico (1985). Perugia. Kunst- und Geschichtsführer. Perugia.
