= Annunciation (Masolino) =

Painting by Masolino da Panicale

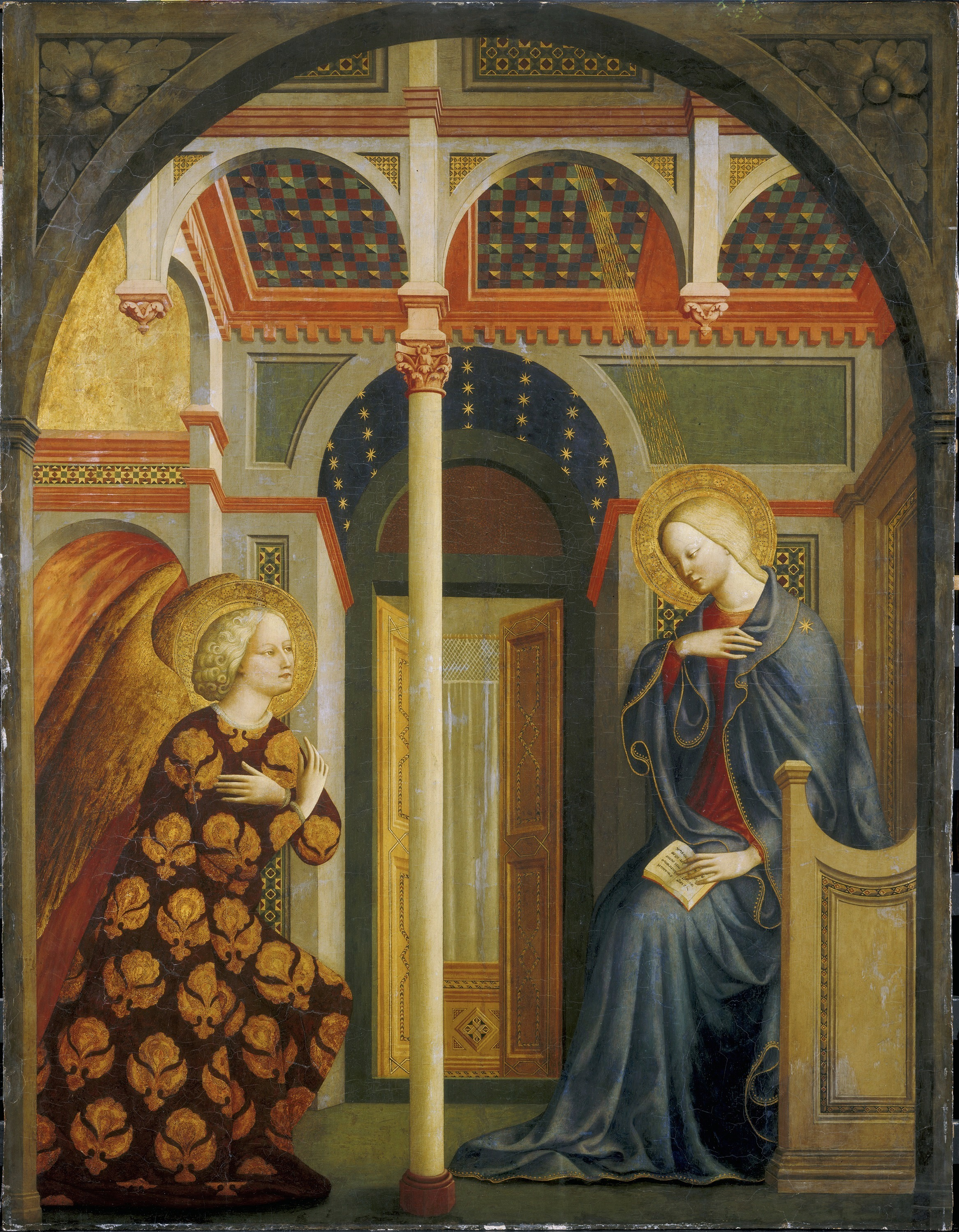
- Artist: Masolino
- Year: c. 1423–1424 or c. 1427–1429
- Medium: tempera on panel
- Dimensions: 148 cm × 115 cm (58 in × 45 in)
- Location: National Gallery of Art, Washington, D.C.

The Annunciation of Masolino is a tempera painting on panel dated to c. 1423–1424 or c. 1427–1429. It is in the collection of the National Gallery of Art in Washington, D.C.

== History ==
The artwork was painted for the altar of the Guardini chapel on the left wall of the Chiesa di San Niccolò Oltrarno in Florence. It is not known whether the work was painted before or after the Brancacci Chapel (where Masolino worked from 1424 to 1425). The date of the painting is tied to the question of Masolino's capacity for using perspective—he might have developed the technique either on his own or with the help of his collaborator on the Brancacci Chapel, Masaccio.

In 1567, the panel was transferred to another chapel, and in 1576 it was placed in the church's sacristy, when it was substituted by a more modern Annunciation painted by Alessandro Fei. It remained in the church until around the beginning of the 19th century—its disappearance from the church was only mentioned in editorial comments from the 1832–1838 edition of Giorgio Vasari's Le Vite and unpublished c. 1800 notes by Tommaso Puccini. The painting was then sold and exported from Florence, perhaps by Francis Douglas, 8th Earl of Wemyss, to Gosford House in Scotland. It passed on in inheritance until it was found in London in 1915 by the antiquarian Robert Langton Douglas, who in 1916 gave it to Henry Goldman of New York. On April 26, 1937, it was bought by the A.W. Mellon Educational and Charitable Trust of Pittsburgh, which then donated it to the National Gallery in Washington, D.C.

== Description and style ==
Annunciation marks the passage from the Annunciation iconography of the 14th century (exemplified by the Annunciation with St. Margaret and St. Ansanus of Simone Martini) to that of the 15th century and the Renaissance. The artwork is a delicate, ornamental scene, with precise chromatic effect. Masolino sets the scene not on a gold background but in a furnished room. He evokes the traditional separation of panels with a central column that divides the scene in two.

Thanks to the use of perspective, the play of the arches directs the viewer's gaze into the background of the painting toward the door. The effect, however, is more decorative than realistic and creates some uncertainty. For example, the connection of the columns to the ceiling: at their bases they seem to be in the foreground, but at their capitals they seem further back. The two protagonists don't seem to inhabit the space but simply appear juxtaposed against it.

The angel is dressed sumptuously and holds his arms crossed in a sign of reverence to the Virgin. She is seated on a throne and holds in her hand her traditional attribute of a book, symbol of the scriptures that will come true. With a gesture, she seems to accept the commission entrusted to her by the Lord, while a divine light illuminates the ceiling above her.

His figure is of elegant aristocracy with a mantle that creates drapery of articulate, moving lines in the International Gothic style. The tapered fingers are typical of Masolino: they look both ethereal and unrealistic.

== Similar works ==
Masolino made another Annunciation early in his career in Panicale and another fragmented Annunciation, composed of two panels with the angel and the Virgin and broken at an unknown time. Both are stored at the National Gallery in Washington. The second work shows the angel in profile and is dated to c. 1430.

These works by Masolino inspired Fra Angelico, who in the 15th century revolutionized the theme of the Annunciation with a series of three works that included his Annunciation now at the Prado.
