= Annunciation of Cortona =

Painting by Fra Angelico

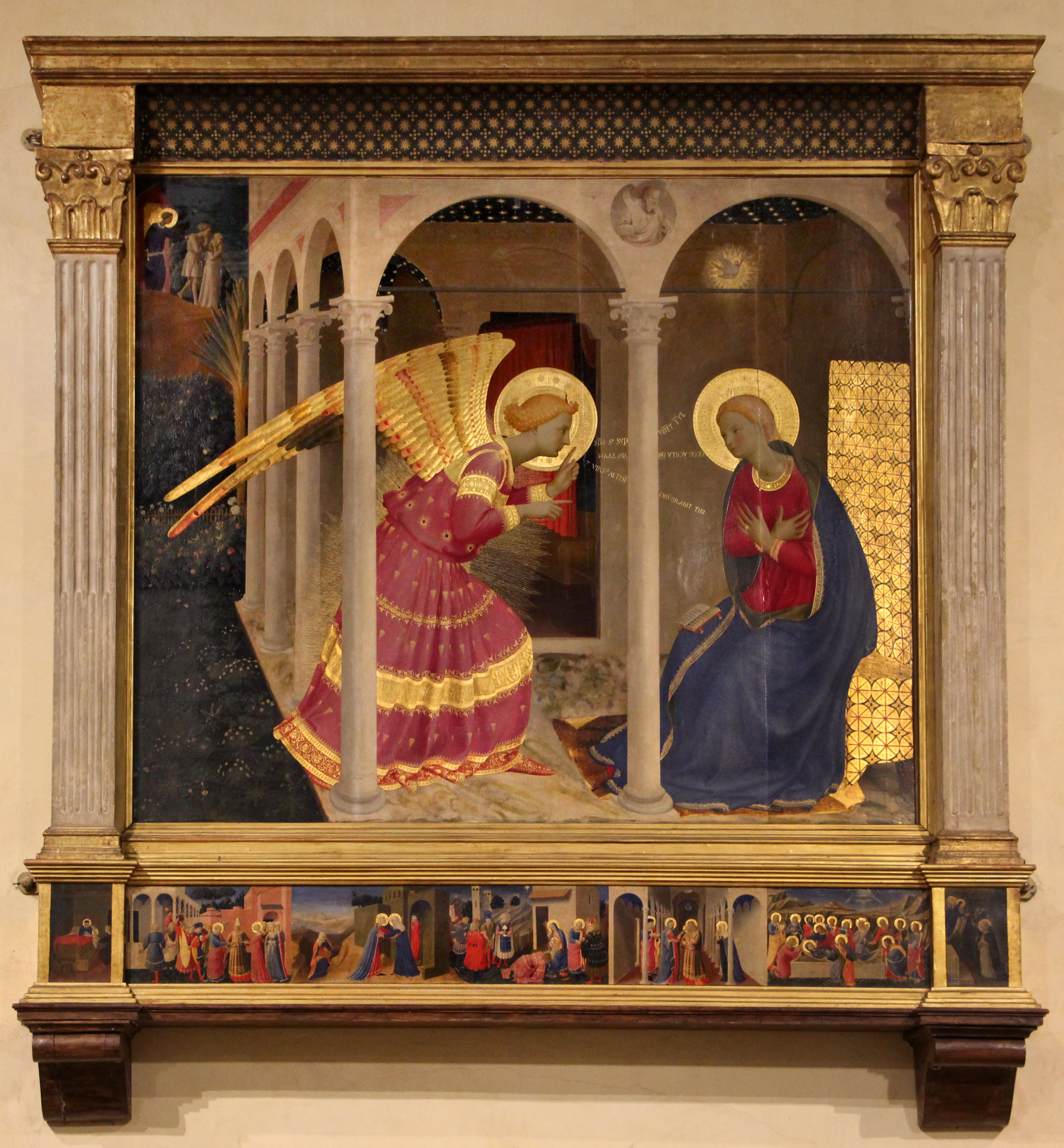
Annunciation of Cortona (1433–1434) by Fra Angelico

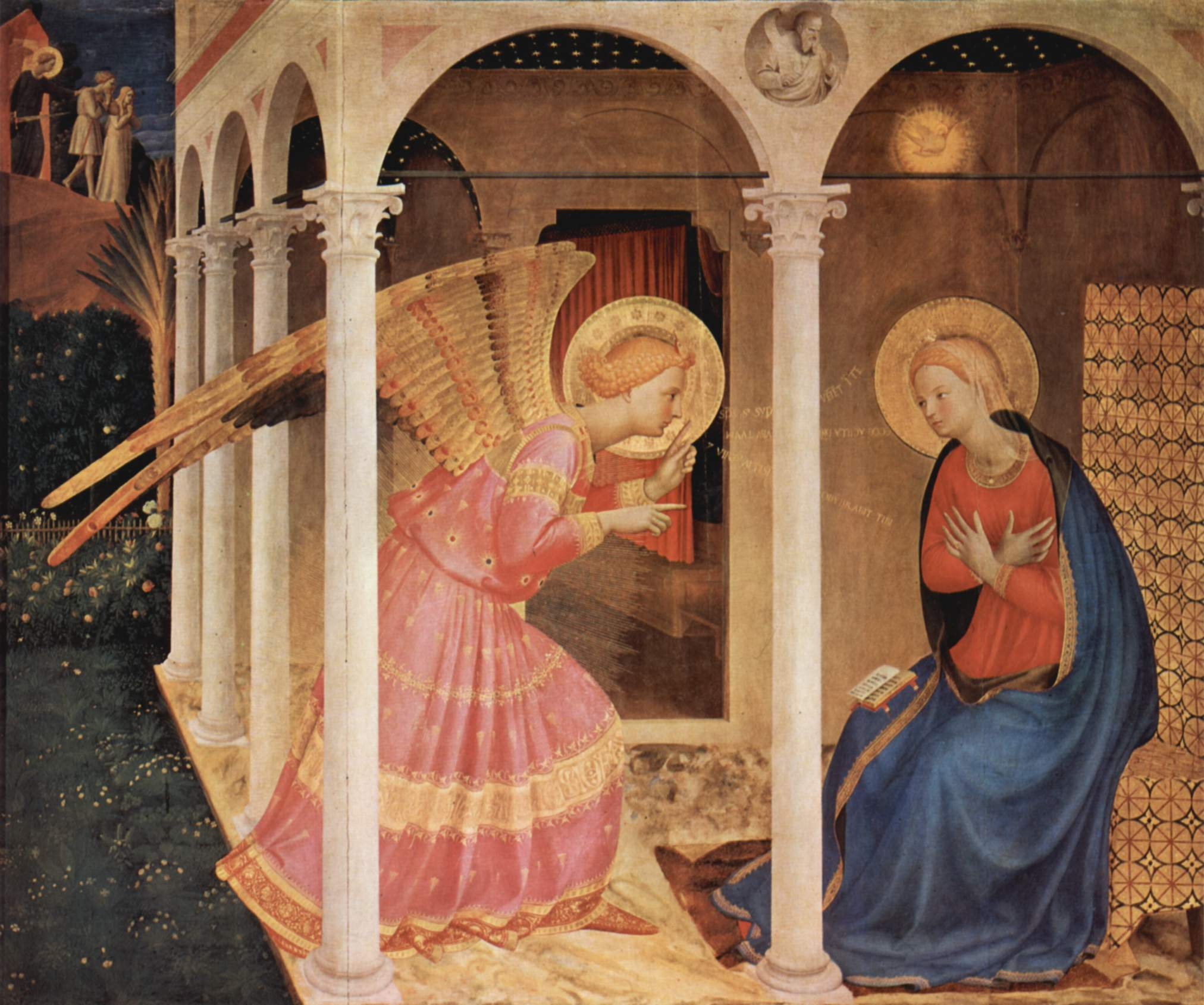
The central painting

The Annunciation of Cortona is a panel-painting altarpiece or retable by the Italian Renaissance painter Fra Angelico: once housed in the Church of Gesù of Cortona, it is now held at the Museo Diocesano in Cortona.

== History ==
The Annunciation of Cortona was painted by Fra Angelico in 1433–1434, in tempera on panel, 175 cm x 180 cm.

This is one of three Annunciations by Fra Angelico on panel (the other two are in the Prado Museum, and the Museo della Basilica di Santa Maria delle Grazie, in San Giovanni Valdarno. Two others, in fresco, are found in the convent of San Marco, Florence, at the top of the access stairs and the third cell.

There are also scenes of the theme combined with Adoration of the Magi at the Museum San Marco, and a diptych in the Galleria Nazionale dell'Umbria.

== Theme ==
The scene is typical of Christian iconography, "The Annunciation to Mary by the Archangel Gabriel", is described in the Gospels and in great detail in The Golden Legend of Jacobus de Voragine, the reference book of painters of the Renaissance, which can be represented in all its symbolic (walled garden column, the presence of the Holy Spirit, an evocation of Adam and Eve expelled from Paradise).

== Description ==
This work is the main panel of a polyptych work, which includes a multi predella panels with scenes from the Life of the Virgin at the same Annunciazione di San Giovanni Valdarno:

- Marriage of the Virgin,
- Adoration of the Magi,
- Presentation in the Temple,
- Dormition.

They are also attributed to Zanobi Strozzi, an assistant of Fra Angelico.

On the left, the scene of invoking the original sin, is consistent with the principles of the Christian iconography of the painting: the pair of Adam and Eve expelled from Paradise is situated outside the walled garden of Mary, set off on a hill beyond a fence.

Conversely from other Annunciations of Fra Angelico, the vanishing point of perspective is in focus monofocal the left of the table.

== Inscriptions ==
Three lines of text are painted between the Archangel on the left and the Virgin on the right. The words of the angel are written on two lines, reading from left to right. The words of Mary are between those two lines, and are written upside-down. As a consequence, one needs to turn a photo of the painting upside-down to comfortably read her words, "Ecce Ancilla Domini" (Behold the Handmaid of the Lord). This indicates to the viewer that these words are not addressed to us, but are rather meant for God, who would be better situated to read them.

While these textual features of the painting seem to have been completely new in Italy, they had been used somewhat earlier in Flanders, notably in two Annunciations by Jan and Hubert van Eyck, first on the cover panels of the Ghent Altarpiece, and then, soon after, in the so-called Washington Annunciation.
