= San Giovanni Valdarno =

- Comune
- Comune di San Giovanni Valdarno
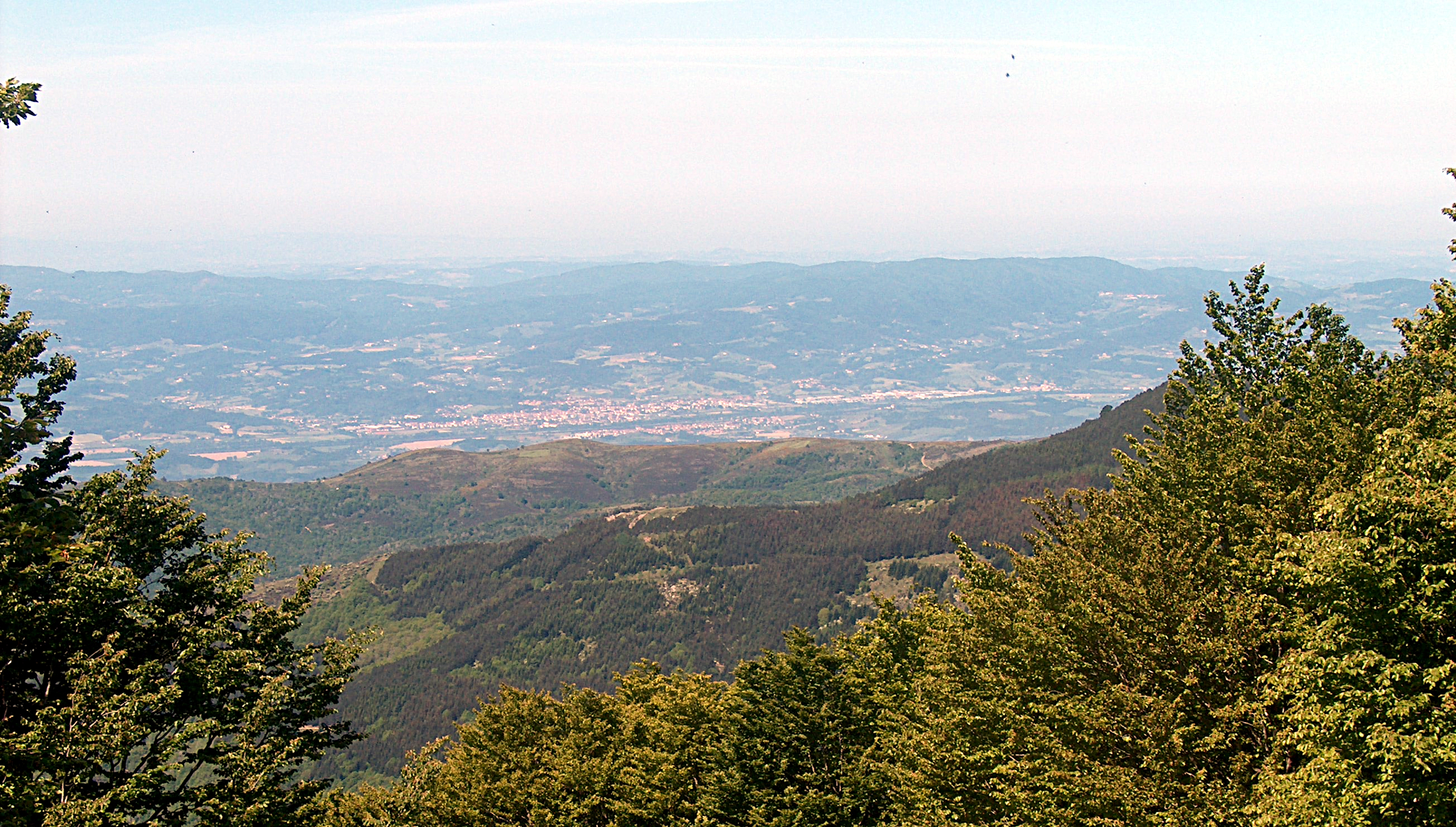
- The Valdarno with San Giovanni in the background.

- Coat of arms

- Location within Italy Location within Tuscany
- Coordinates: 43°33′52″N 11°31′58″E
- Country: Italy
- Region: Tuscany
- Province: Arezzo (AR)
- Frazioni: Badiola-Renacci, Borro al Quercio, Gruccia, Montecarlo, Ponte alle forche, Porcellino, Pruneto

Government
  - Mayor: Valentina Vadi (since 2019)

Area
  - Total: 21.32 km^{2} (8.23 sq mi)
- Elevation: 134 m (440 ft)

Population (April 2024)
  - Total: 16,485
  - Density: 773.2/km^{2} (2,003/sq mi)
- Demonym: Sangiovannesi
- Time zone: UTC+1 (CET)
  - Summer (DST): UTC+2 (CEST)
- Postal code: 52027
- Dialing code: 055
- Patron saint: St. John the Baptist
- Saint day: 24 June
- Website: Official website

San Giovanni Valdarno is a town and comune in the province of Arezzo, Tuscany, central Italy, located in the valley of the Arno River.

== History ==
According to the Italian medieval historian Giovanni Villani, the town was founded in 1296, by the Republic of Florence. The design of the historic center is based on the organization of Roman cities with a large central piazza from which two main roads run perpendicular to each other. From these two main roads run other secondary streets.

The town is the birthplace of the early Renaissance painter Masaccio.

== Main sights ==
- Palazzo Pretorio or Palazzo d'Arnolfo (13th century)
- Convent of San Francesco a Montecarlo. It houses an Incoronation of the Virgin by Neri di Bicci (1472–1475)
- Basilica of Santa Maria delle Grazie (built in 1484, but with a 19th-century Neoclassical façade). Its museum houses Beato Angelico's Annunciation.
- Church of San Lorenzo (early 14th century)

== Sister cities ==
- Mahbes, Western Sahara
- (United States) Corning, USA (since 2003)
- (United States) West Springfield, Massachusetts, USA
- Srebrenica, Bosnia and Herzegovina (since 2012)
- Jericho, State of Palestine
