= Bartolini Salimbeni Chapel =

Chapel in a church of Florence

Coordinates: 43°46′13″N 11°15′03″E

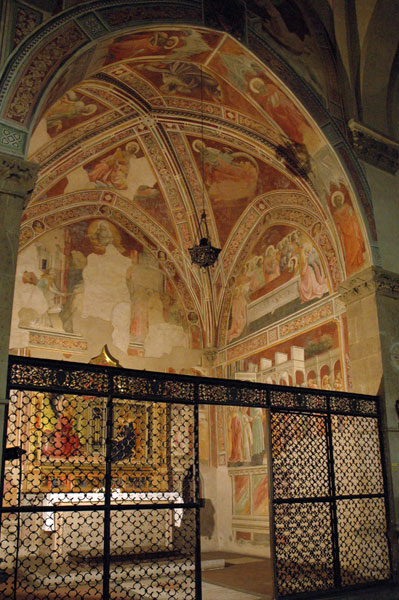
View of the Chapel

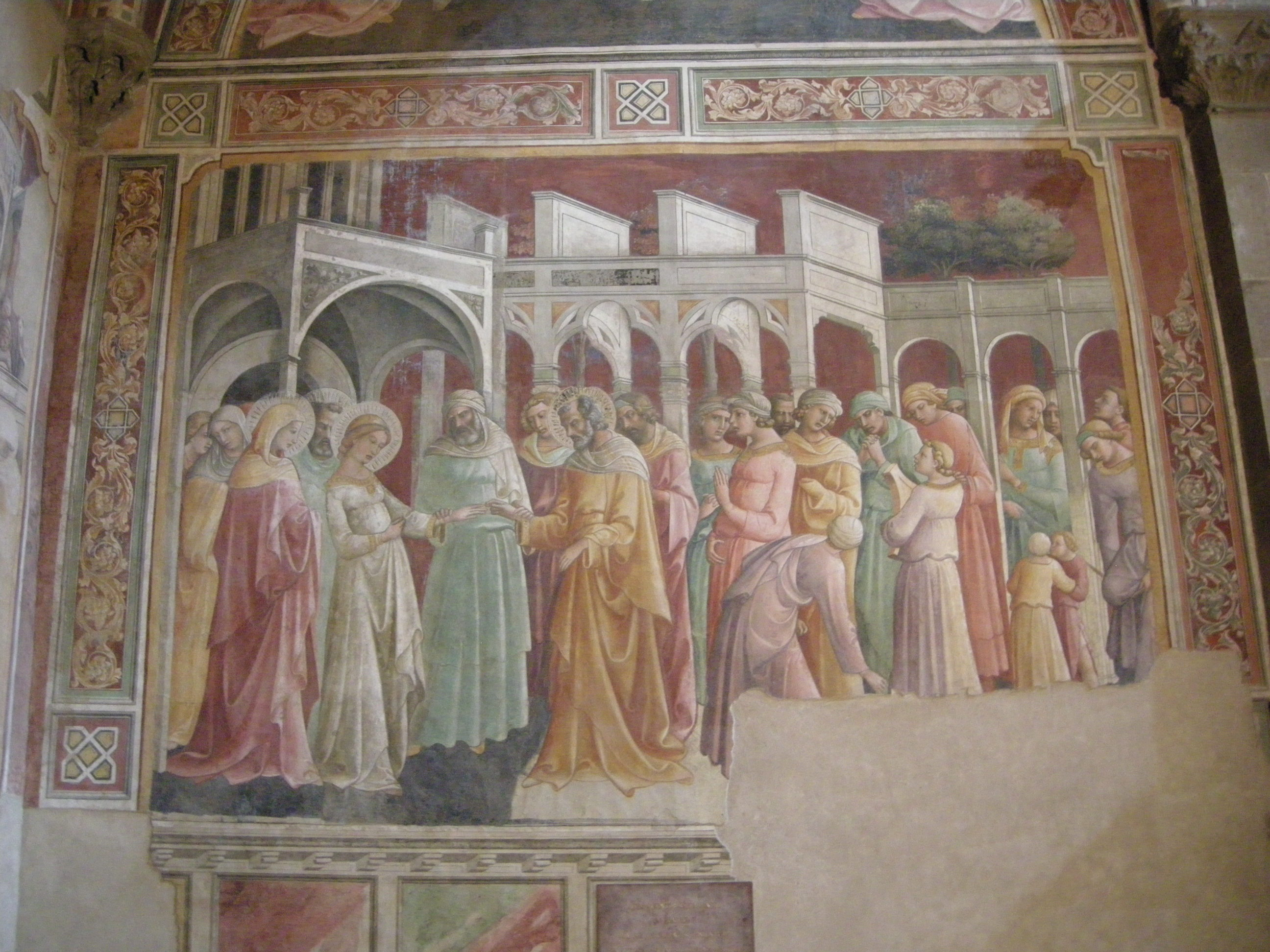
Marriage of the Virgin

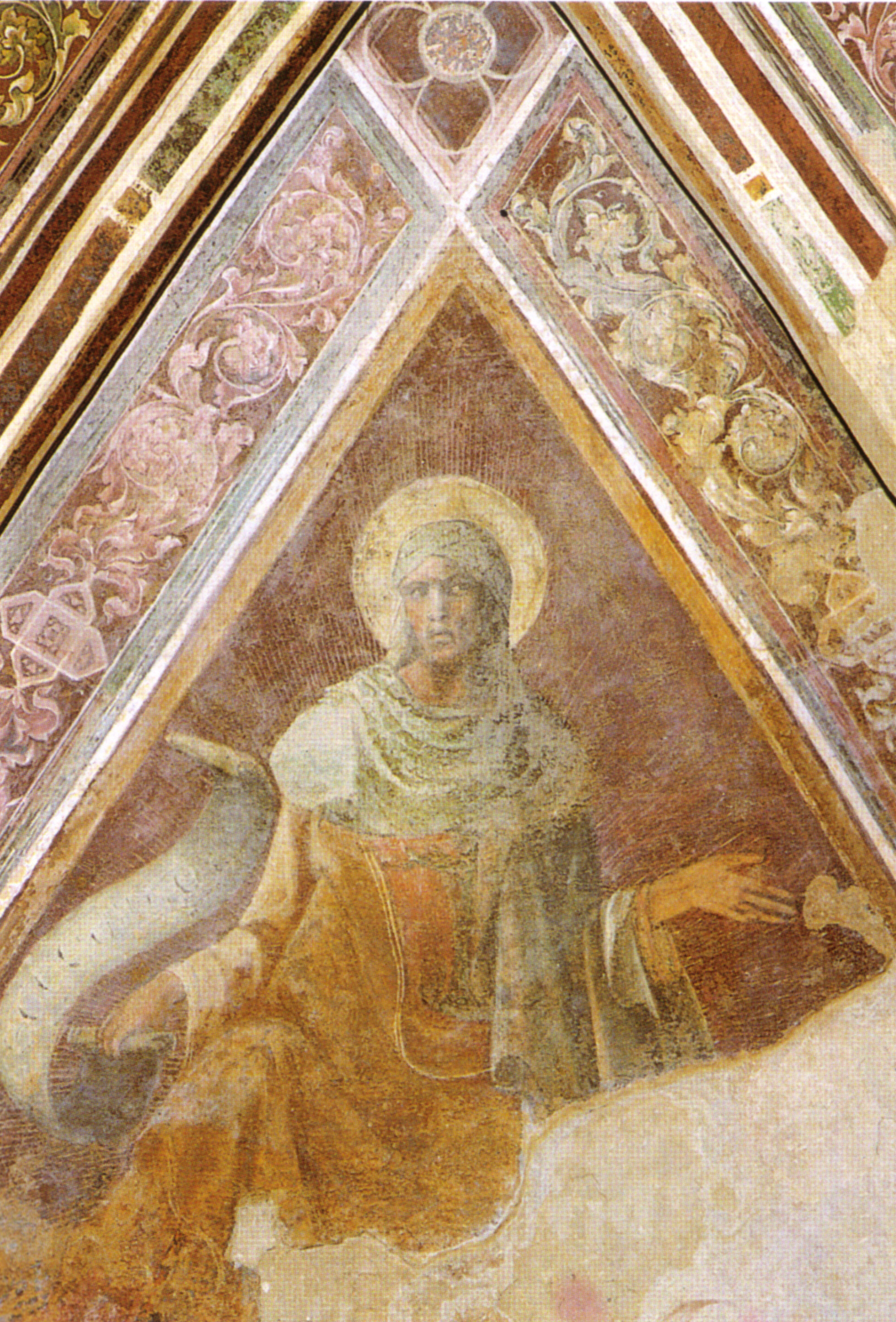
The Prophet Micah

The Bartolini Salimbeni Chapel (Italian: Cappella Bartolini Salimbeni) is a chapel in the church of Santa Trinita, Florence, central Italy. Its decoration by Lorenzo Monaco, dating to the 1420s, are one of the few surviving examples of International Gothic frescoes in Italy. The chapel has kept other original elements, such as its altarpiece, an Annunciation, also by Monaco, and the railings.

== History ==
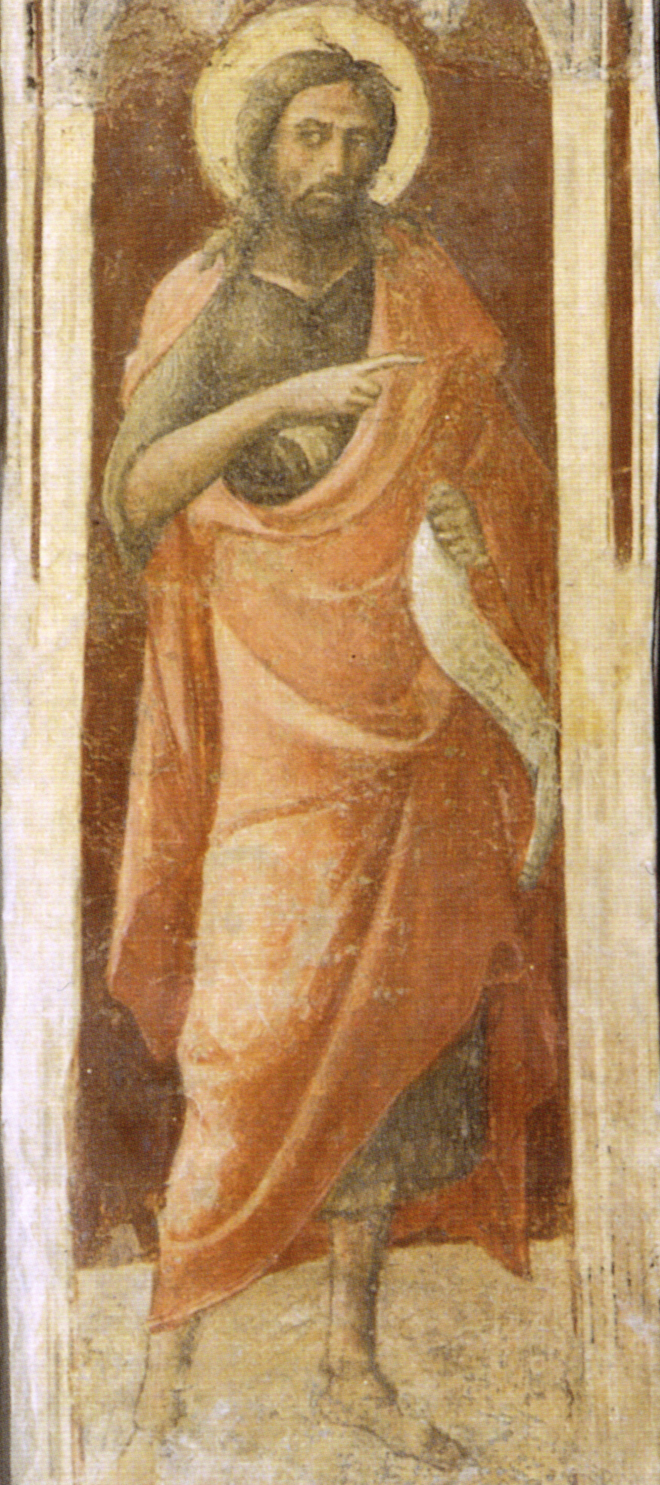
St. John the Baptist

The chapel, created during the Gothic renovation and enlargement of the church started in the mid-13th century, was owned by the rich merchant family of the Bartolini-Salimbeni since as early as 1363. Their residence, the Palazzo Bartolini Salimbeni, is located in the same square as the church.

Around 1390, the chapel had been already decorated by Spinello Aretino; traces of his work were found during the 1960s restorations. Lorenzo Monaco's frescoes date to the 1420s, when a redecoration program was carried out in the whole church, as testified also by fragments of Giovanni Francesco Toscani's frescoes in the annexed Ardinghelli Chapel.

Monaco was inspired by numerous contemporary examples of Histories of the Virgin cycles, such as the Baroncelli Chapel by Taddeo Gaddi, the Rinuccini Chapel by Giovanni da Milano and others, in the Basilica of Santa Croce, Orcagna's frescoes in Santa Maria Novella, the Holy Cingulum Chapel by Agnolo Gaddi in the Prato Cathedral and the stained glass of Orsanmichele, which perhaps Lorenzo Monaco had collaborated on.

The frescoes were covered by white plaster in 1740, and were rediscovered in 1885–1887 by Augusto Burchi. In 1944, the retreating German forces blew up the nearby Ponte Santa Trinita, also causing damage to the frescoes. They were restored in 1961 and again in 2004.

== Description ==
The frescoes, fragments of which are now lost, occupy the chapel's walls, vault, arch and lunette. Lorenzo Monaco was initially a miniaturist, but also worked on (wooden) panels: an outstanding example of the latter is the altarpiece in this chapel, his Annunciation.

The theme of the frescoes is connected to the contemporary dispute about the Immaculate Conception of Mary, involving the question of whether she had been born without the original sin: the dispute saw the Franciscans and the Benedictines (including the Vallumbrosan Order holding the church at the time) against the Dominicans. Monaco's frescoes were inspired by the apocryphal Gospel of James, dealing with Mary's infancy and supporting the Vallumbrosan's view that she had been not naturally born by her father.

The cycle begins in the lunette on the left wall, portraying the Espulsion of Joachim from the Temple and the Annunciation to Joachim. Below are the Meeting of Joachim and Anne and Anne at the Golden Gate, set in a fanciful Jerusalem with high tower, belfries and other edifices painted in pink. The water of a stream where several youths are drinking is a symbol of Mary as the source of life, while the sea is a hint to her attribute as Stella Maris ("Star of the Sea") and the islet a symbol of virginity. The stories continue in the middle part of the end wall, with the Nativity of the Virgin, following the same scheme of Pietro Lorenzetti's Nativity of the Virgin, with Jesus bathing, and the Presentation of the Virgin at the Temple. The latter scene contains several numerology hints in the steps (three and seven, the number of the Theological virtues and all the Virtues respectively) and in the arches of Solomon's Temple (three like the Holy Trinity).

The scene on the mid-left wall, perhaps the sole executed by Lorenzo Monaco alone, depicts the Marriage of the Virgin. The pretenders who are refused by Mary walk from the right to left such as in the artist's Adoration of the Magi at the Uffizi; one of them (that in the background, behind the arcade) is a possible self-portrait of Monaco, although his age does not correspond to the artist's one at the time. The next scene is that of the Annunciation, whose predella has scenes of the Visitation, Nativity and Annunciation to the Shepherds, Adoration of the Magi and the Flight to Egypt.

The next episodes depicted include some miracles connected to Mary: the Dormitio, the Assumption and the Miracle of the Snow. In the cross vault are portrayals of Prophets David, Isaiah, Malachi and Micah.
