= Coronation of the Virgin (Fra Angelico, Uffizi) =

Altarpiece by Fra Angelico

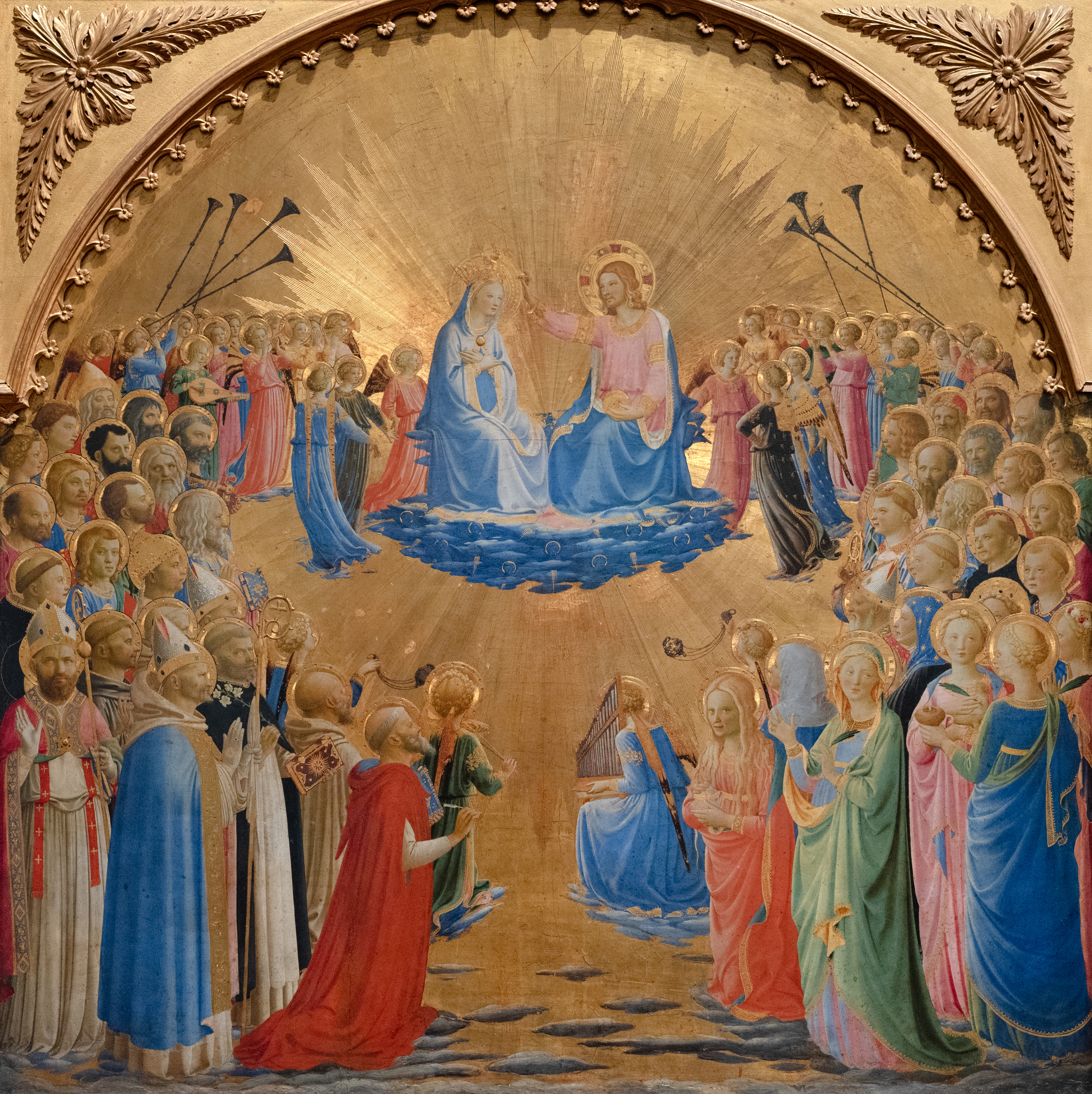
- Artist: Fra Angelico
- Year: c. 1432
- Medium: Tempera on panel
- Dimensions: 112 cm × 114 cm (44 in × 45 in)
- Location: Uffizi Gallery, Florence

The Coronation of the Virgin is a painting of the Coronation of the Virgin by the Italian early Renaissance painter Fra Angelico, executed around 1432. It is now in the Uffizi Gallery of Florence. The artist executed another Coronation of the Virgin (c. 1434–1435), now in the Louvre in Paris.

== History ==
The work is mentioned as by Fra Angelico in a manuscript of the Biblioteca Nazionale di Firenze. Giorgio Vasari writes that it was located in the church of Sant'Egidio at Florence. Two panels of the predella which once was part of the work are known; they portray the Marriage and the Funeral of the Virgin, and are currently exhibited in the museum of San Marco, Florence.

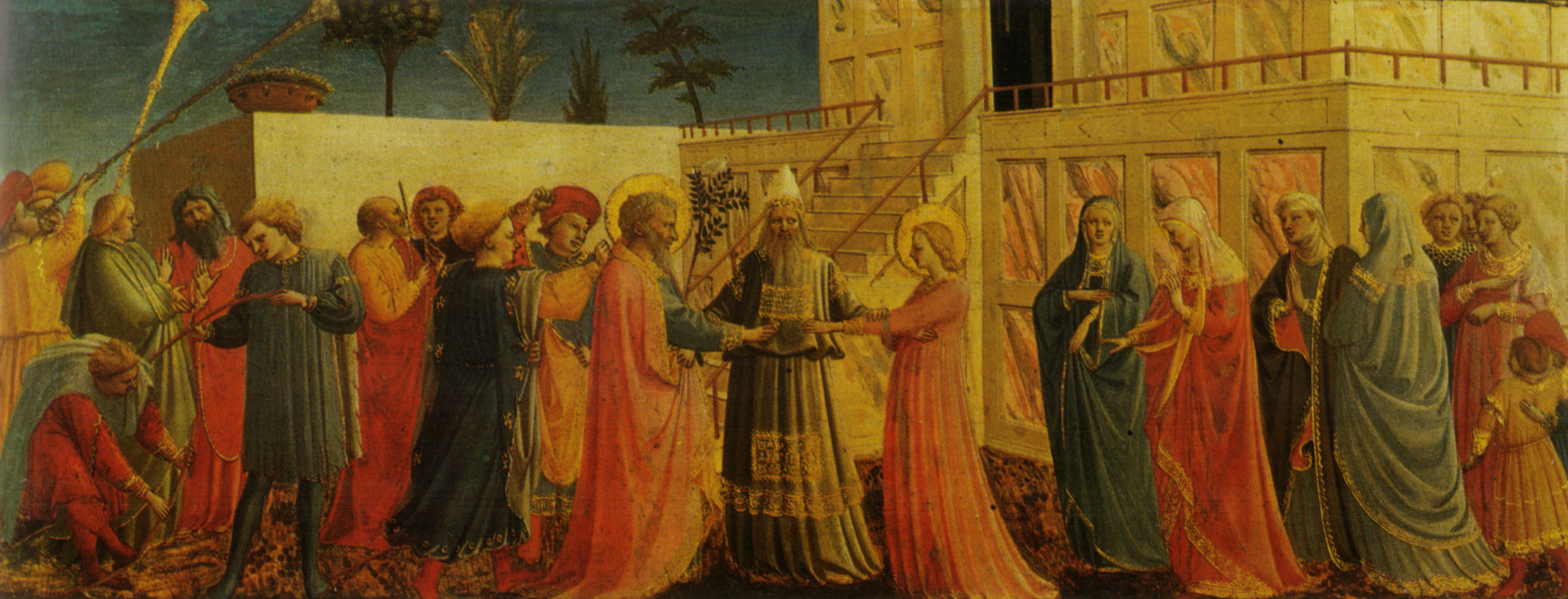
Detail of the predella with the Marriage of the Virgin

The altarpiece arrived at the Uffizi in 1825. The current frame dates to this period.

== Description ==
The painting is on a gold ground (gilded background), a feature of medieval painting, over which is a small paradise where the Coronation is being held.

It portrays Christ crowning the Virgin; both are surrounded by rays (executed through an engraving technique above the gilded background) which symbolize the divine light. The painting has a mystic tone found in other Fra Angelico works, with a large crowd of saints, angels and blessed figures enhancing this aspect. On the left, in the foreground, is St. Egidius, titular of the church which originally housed the work. His face is perhaps modelled on that of Antonino Pierozzi, the former prior of the convent of San Marco to which Fra Angelico belonged. He is followed by Zenobius of Florence, St. Francis and St. Dominic. On the right side are female saints, including a kneeling Mary Magdalene. In the last rows are musician angels.

The structure of the work and the use of brilliant colors shows the influence of Angelico's master, Lorenzo Monaco, who executed another Coronation of the Virgin, also in the Uffizi.

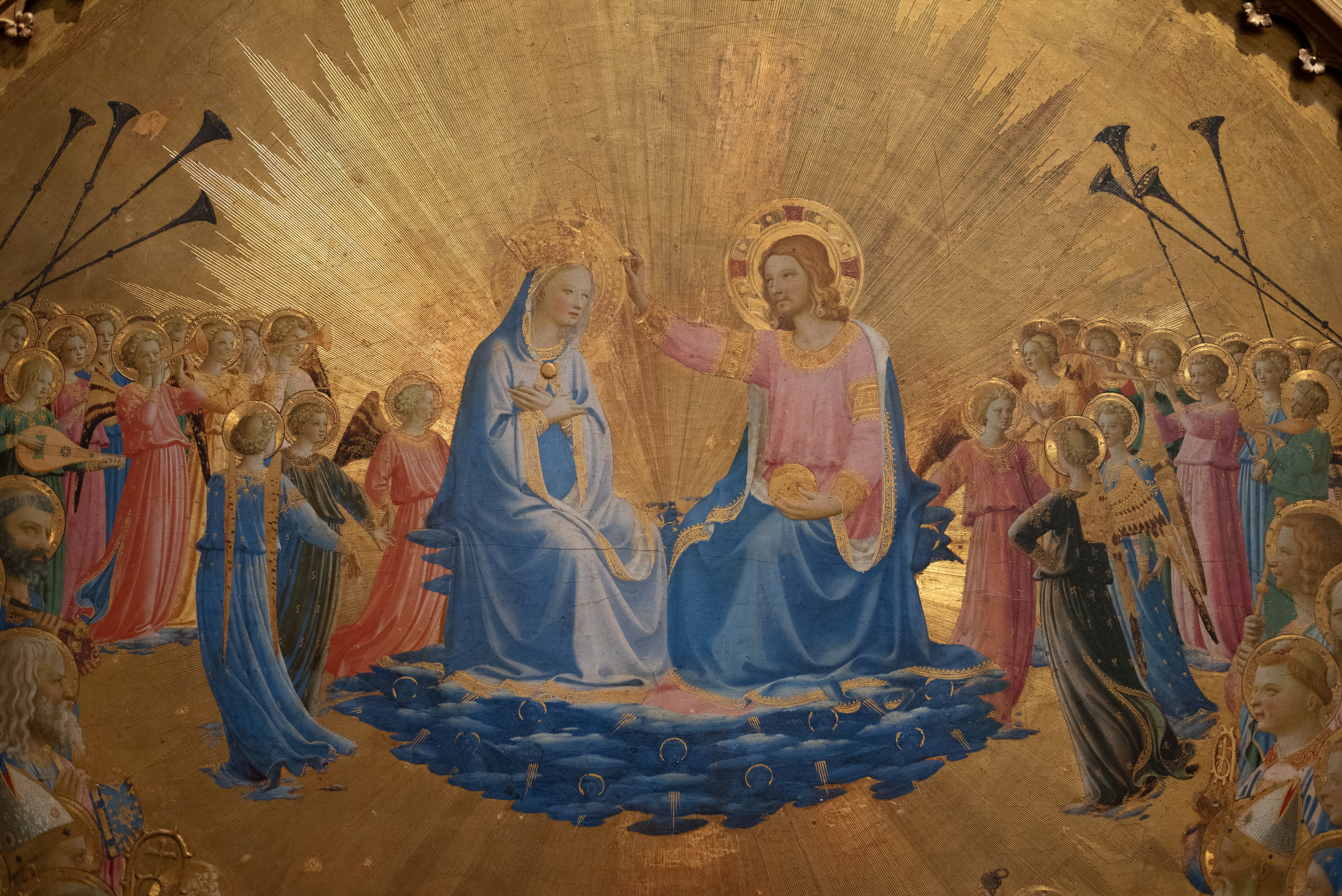
Mary and Christ

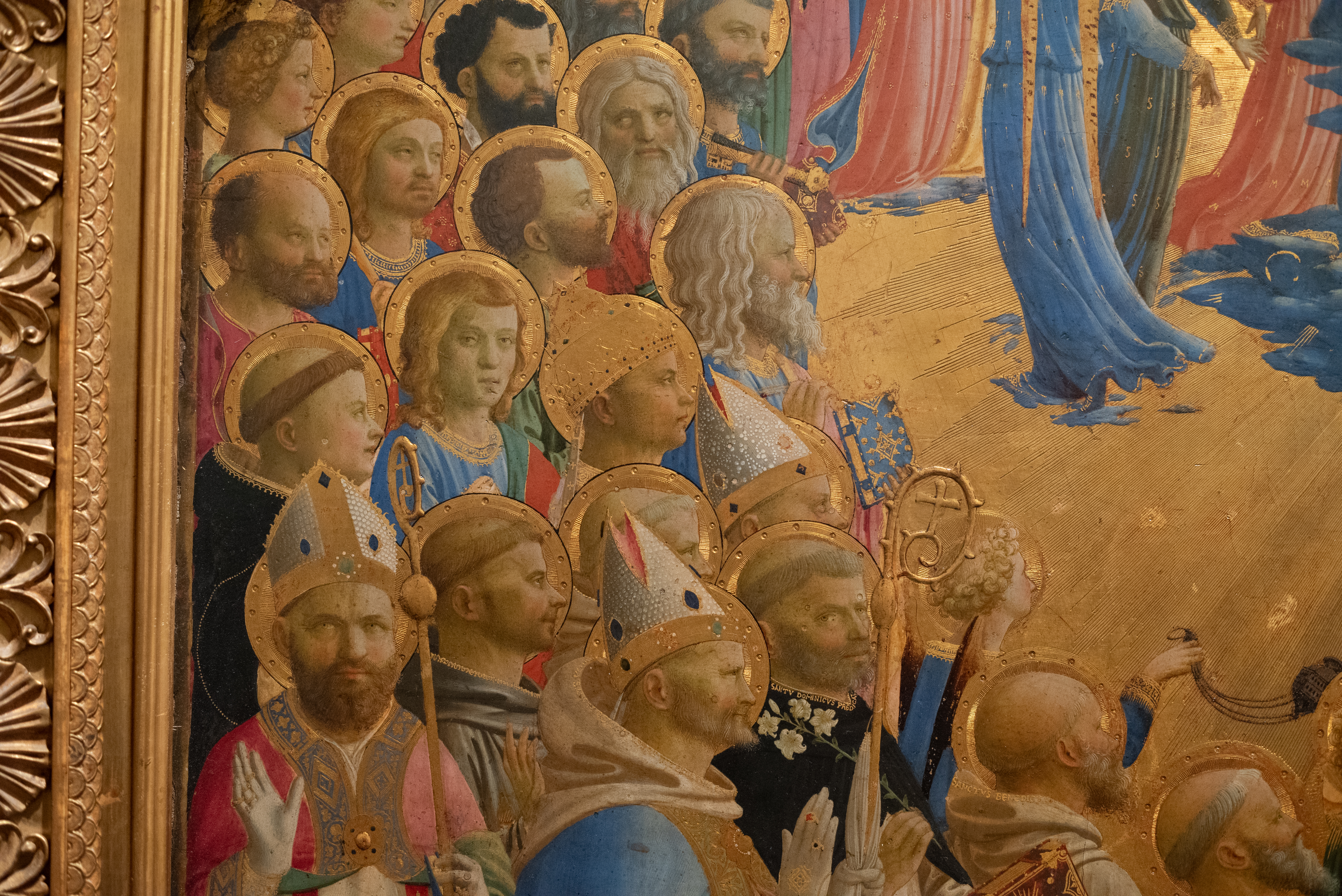
Male saints

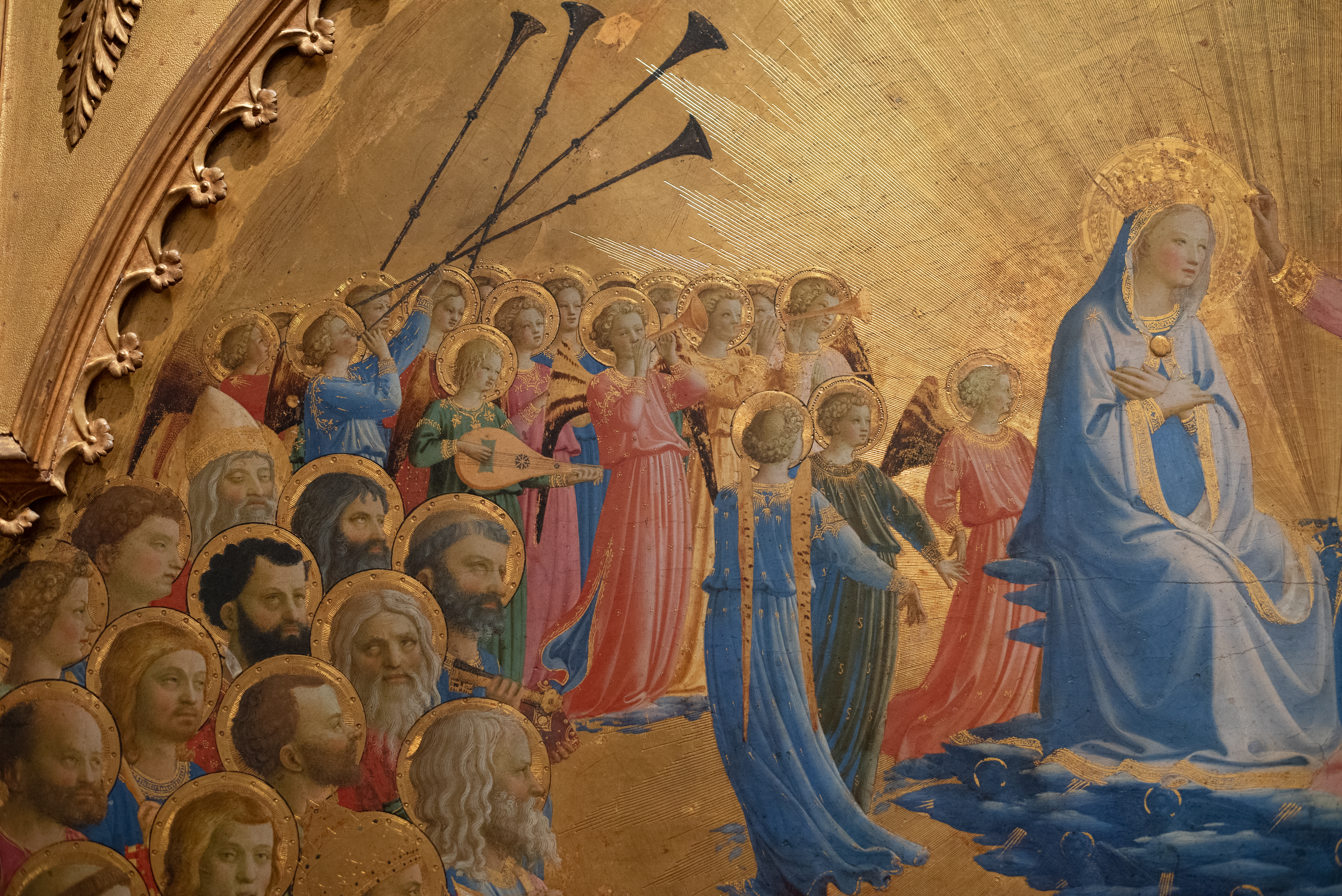
Angelic chorus

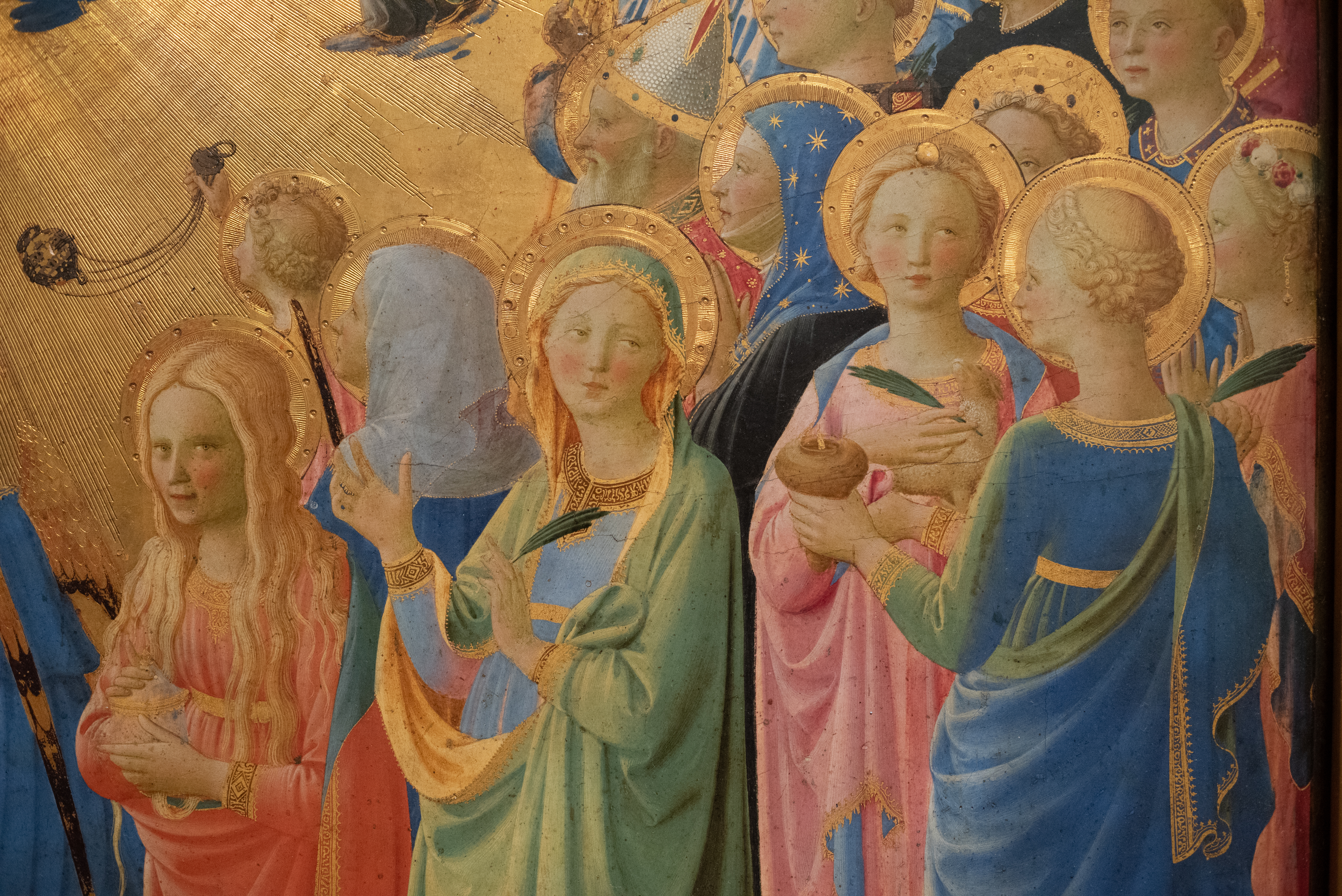
Female saints

== Sources ==
- Pope-Hennessy, John (1981). Beato Angelico. Florence: Scala.
- Cornini, Guido (2000). Beato Angelico. Florence: Giunti. ISBN 88-09-01602-5.
