= Bartolini Salimbeni Annunciation =

Painting by Lorenzo Monaco

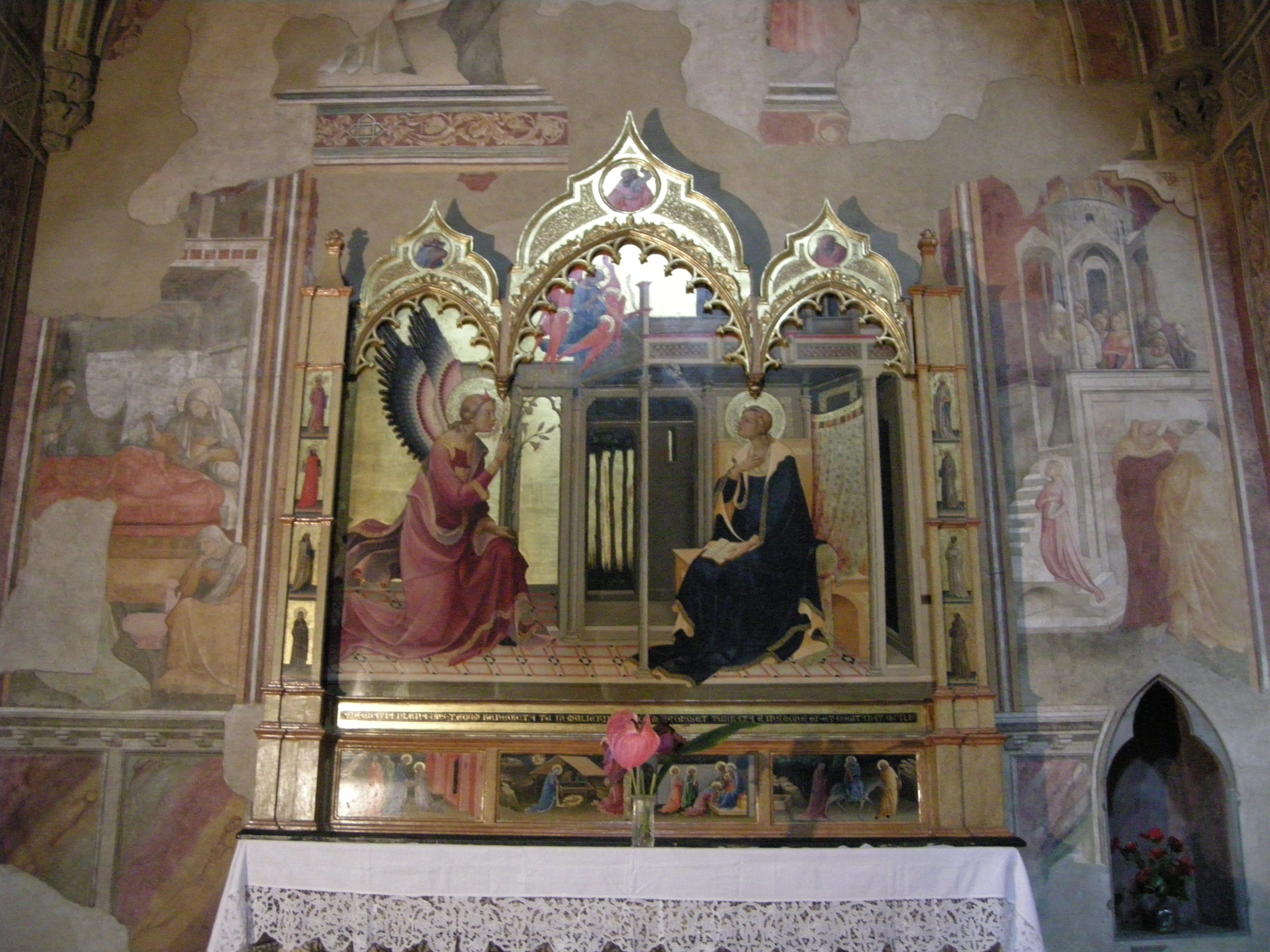
- Artist: Lorenzo Monaco
- Year: c. 1420–1424
- Medium: Tempera on panel
- Location: Santa Trinita, Florence

The Bartolini Salimbeni Annunciation (Italian: Annunciazione Bartolini Salimbeni) is a tempera on panel painting by the Italian Gothic painter Lorenzo Monaco, completed just before his death (1420–1424). It is housed in the Bartolini Salimbeni Chapel of the church of Santa Trinita, Florence.

== History ==
The panel follows the same stylistic and narrative pattern as the other frescoes in the chapel, also by Lorenzo Monaco. It shows the Annunciation and, in the predella, other episodes of the Life of the Virgin which do not feature in the frescoes.

In 1998, a restoration performed by the Opificio delle Pietre Dure showed that for the Virgin's mantle a simpler technique was used, indicating that the work was perhaps completed by one Monaco's pupils after his death.

== Description ==
The panel is intermediate between a medieval polyptych and a Renaissance altarpiece. It is generally described as the first work in which the subject has a direct relationship with the surrounding architecture. Another innovation is the small side pillars with saints, later used also by Masaccio and Fra Angelico.

The central panel depicts the Annunciation in a single painted surface whose rounded top arches recall however the shape of a triptych. Above the three arches are medallions with prophets, of whom only the middle one (Isaiah) has been identified, thanks to the cartouche saying Ecce Virgo [concipiet]. Below, the scene is completed by a predella with four scenes: Visitation, Nativity, Adoration of the Magi and Flight into Egypt. These shows typical elements of the International Gothic style, such as the fine arabesques in the drapes and the delicate tonalities in contrast with the dark backgrounds. In the Adoration, the detail of the old king kneeling to kiss the Child is taken from a Ghiberti's tile, and was also used by Gentile da Fabriano in his Strozzi Altarpiece. In the Flight, the palm is taken from the Gospel of Pseudo-Matthew, which describes the tree that bent itself to allow the passage of the holy family.

Only four of the five side compartments of each pillar are painted: the 1990s restoration did not find trace of paint in the upper ones, so it is likely that they have been empty since the work's execution.

The Annunciation depicts a sitting Madonna, with an angel arriving from the left to stop her reading (a hint to the Holy Books). She looks at God, who is portrayed in the middle arch, surrounded by seraphims, and who sends her the dove of the Holy Ghost.

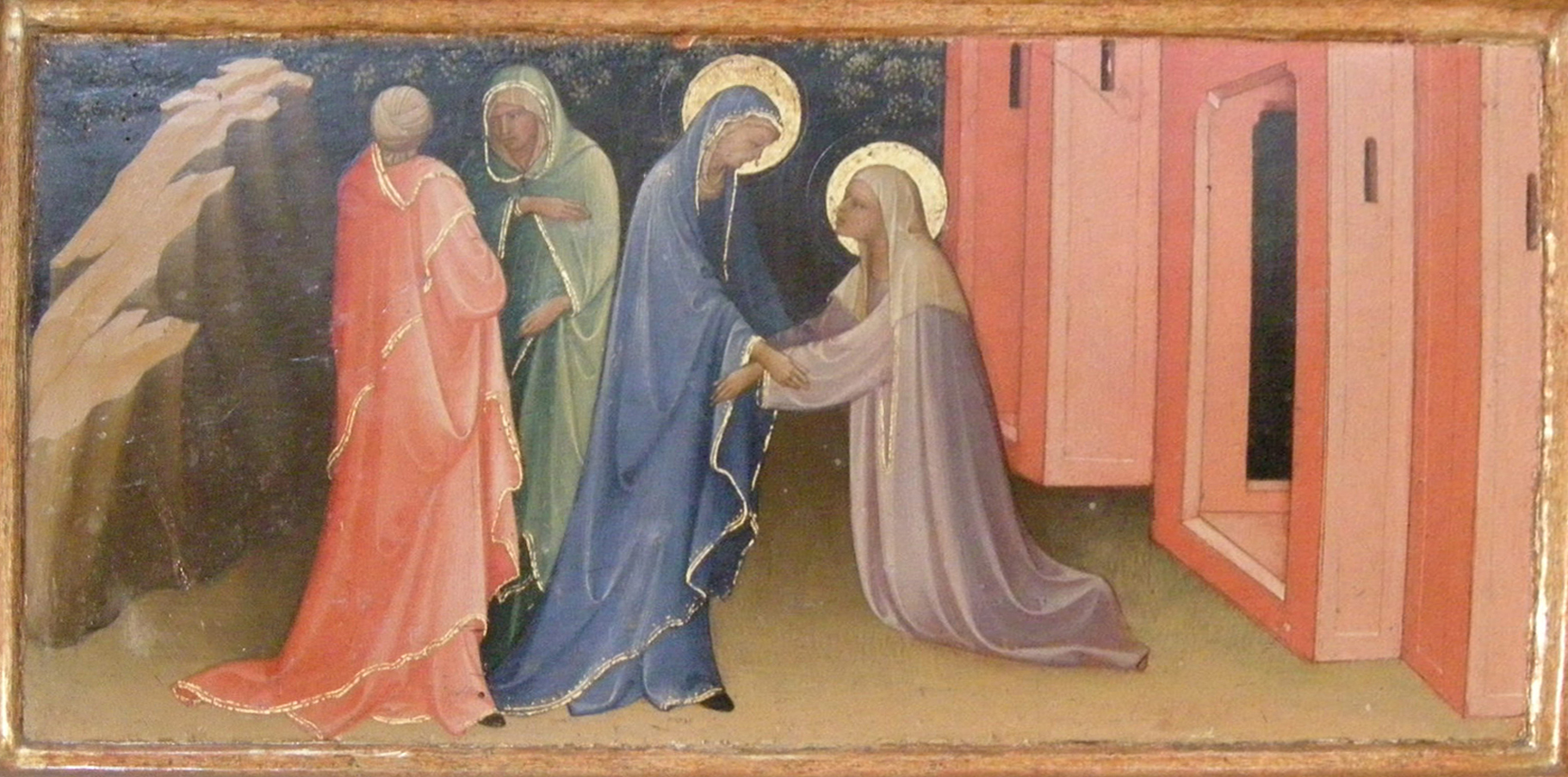
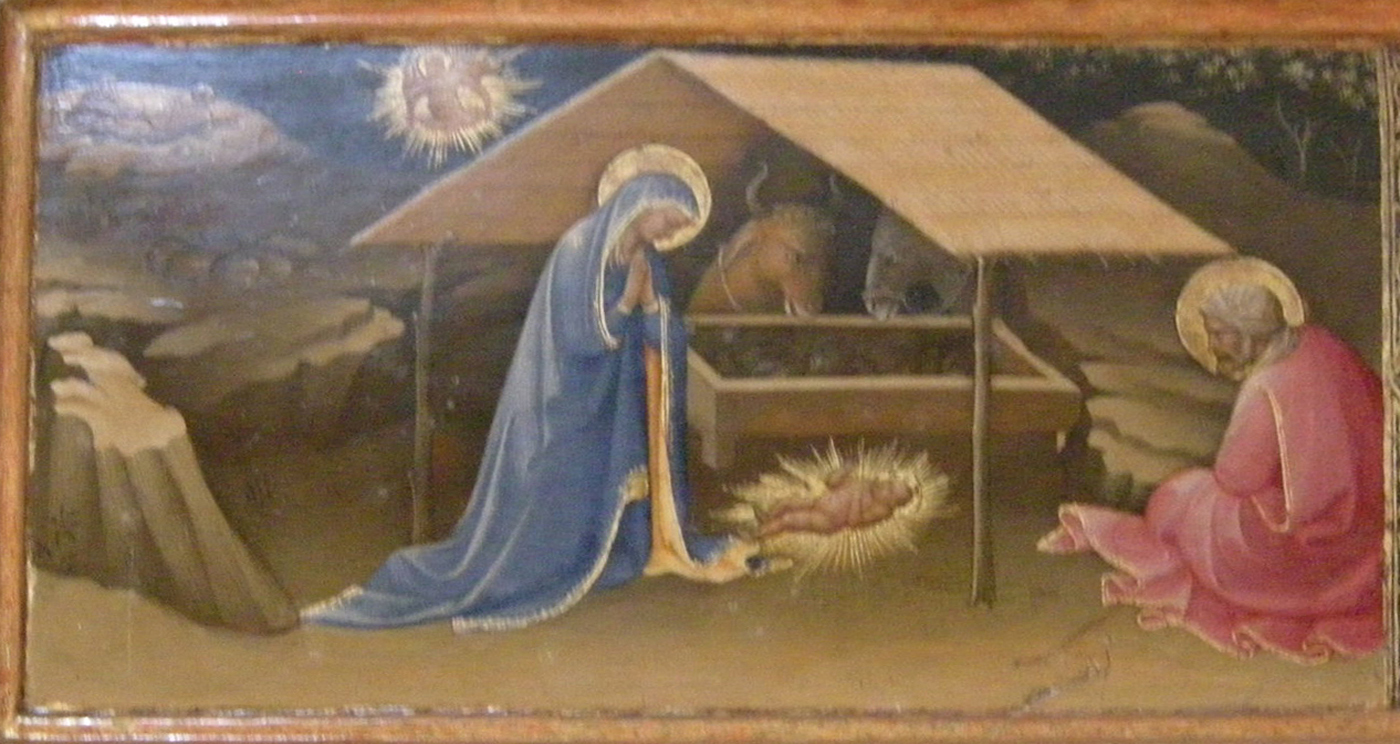
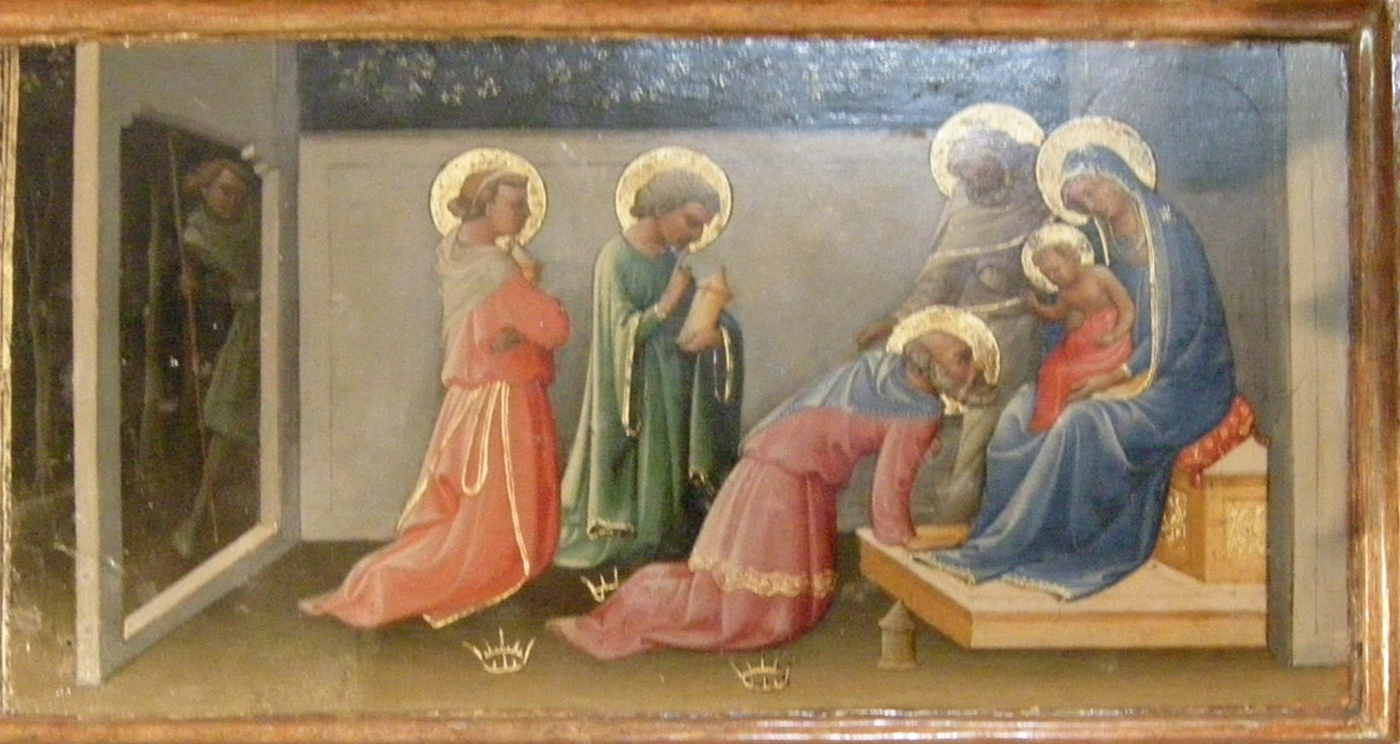
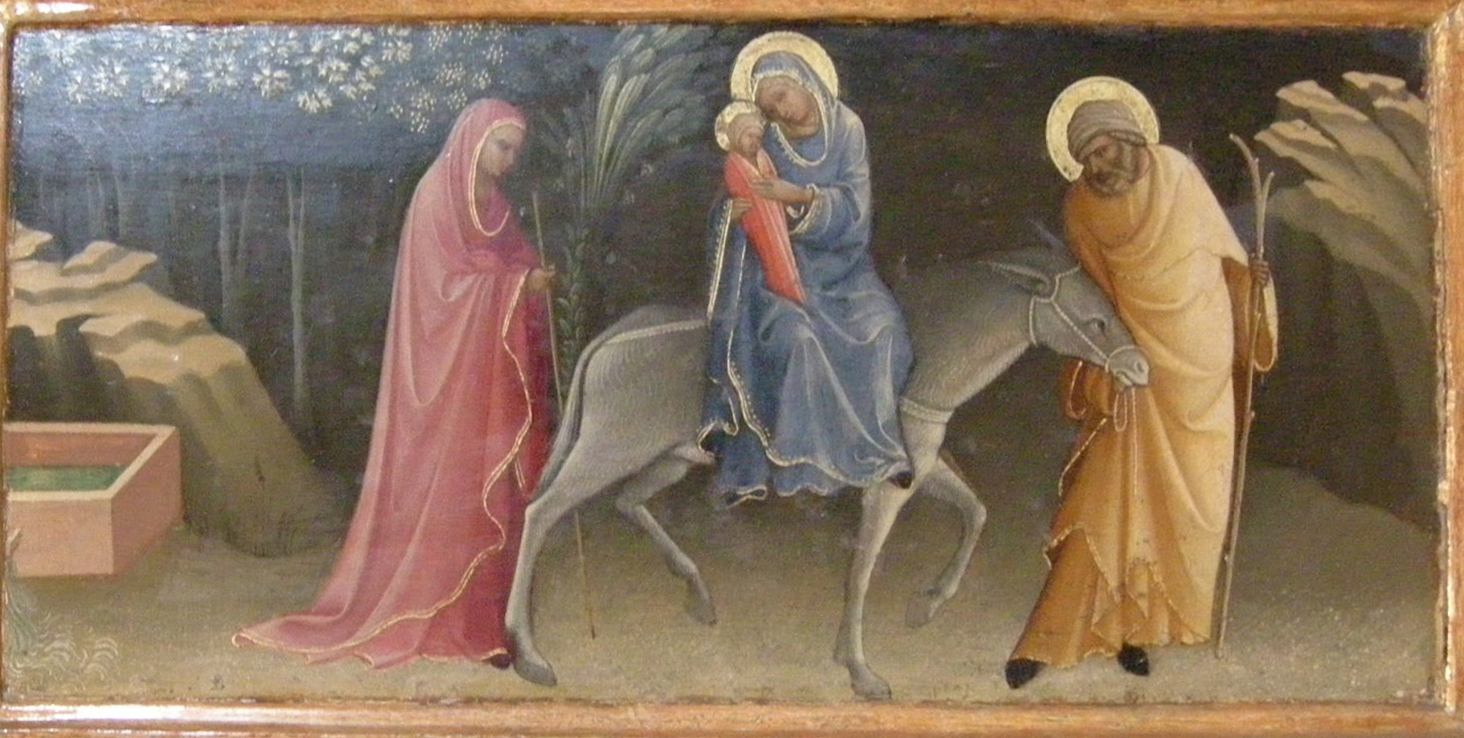
Predella panels

== Sources ==
- Marcello Bellini (1998). Cappelle del Rinascimento a Firenze. Florence: Giusti.
