= Santa Maria degli Angeli, Florence =

Church in Florence, Italy

Coordinates: 43°46′28.29″N 11°15′39.15″E

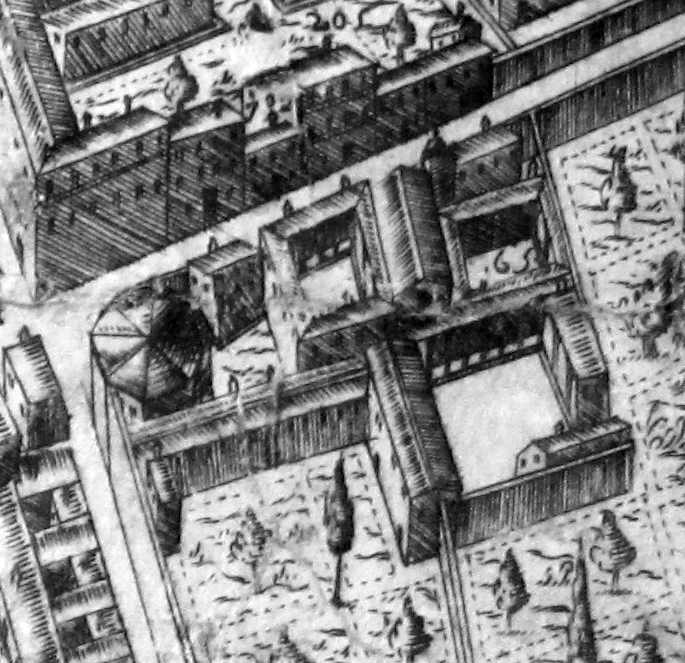
Santa Maria degli Angeli, detail of the etched map of Florence by Stefano Buonsignori, printed in 1594, (Palazzo Vecchio, Florence)

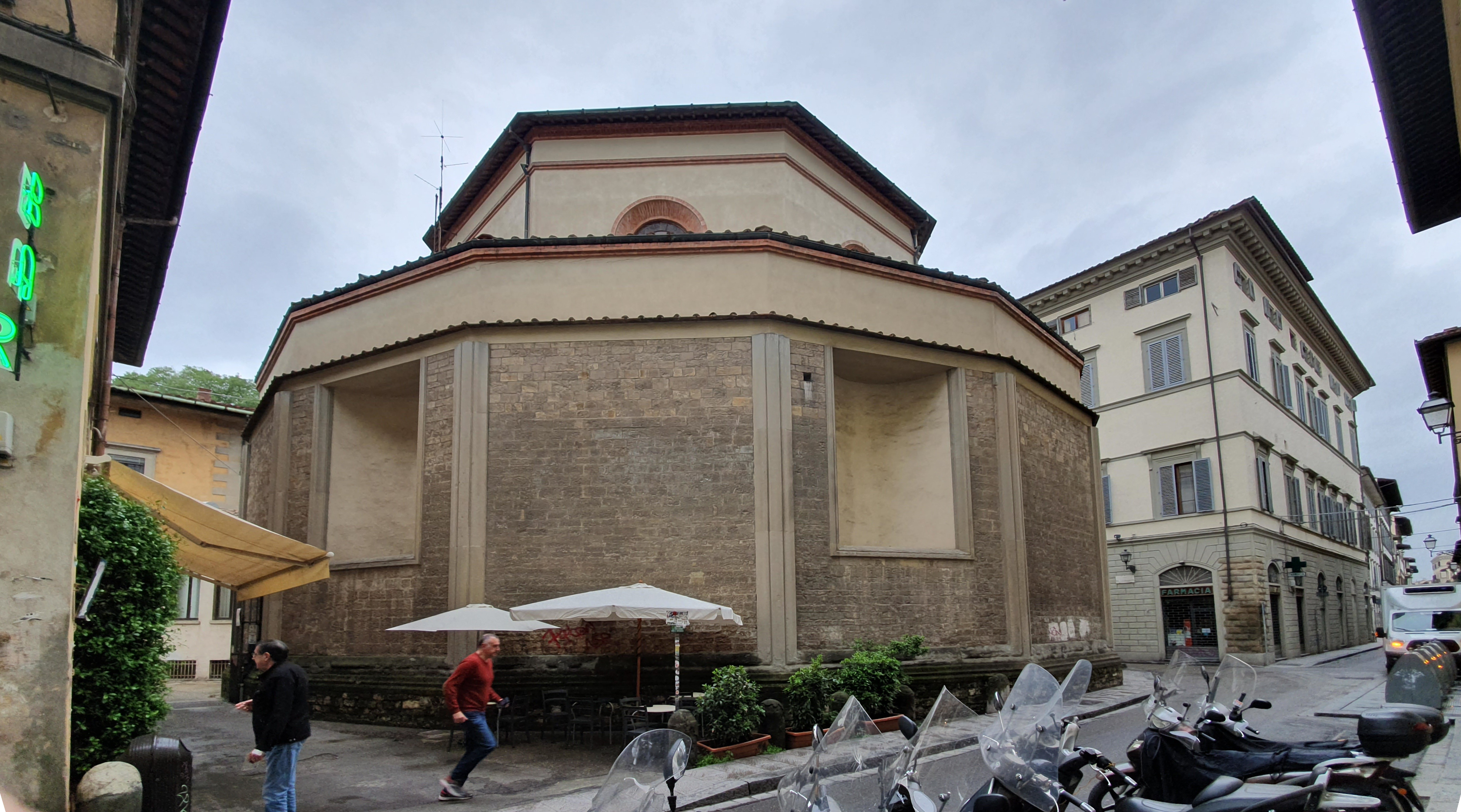
Brunelleschi's Rotunda

Santa Maria degli Angeli (St. Mary of the Angels) is the former church of a now-defunct monastery of that name in Florence, Italy. It belonged to the Camaldolese order, which was a reformed branch of the Benedictines. The order is based on the hermitage which was founded near Arezzo in 1012 by the hermit St. Romuald at Camaldoli, hence the name. Very little of the medieval building exists today.

== History ==
When purchased by the Camaldolese around 1294 the land was owned by the Alluodi family. The monastic complex eventually had a small church, cells, a refectory and a meeting room. A scriptorium was established by 1332.

The Camaldoli monastery was a major center of studies in the early Renaissance and its scriptorium was a noted producer of manuscripts of high quality. It also produced work that could bring revenue to support the monastery. Some of the monks were skilled miniaturists. Many of the illustrations from its work are found in art collections around the world.

The late High Gothic painter, Lorenzo Monaco, was a monk at Camaldoli for a time, while he tested his vocation, but ultimately he left. Nevertheless, he executed a series of artworks for the Camaldoli monastery and other Camaldolese houses, both during his time in the Order and afterwards. The Camaldoli church once housed a series of artworks now located elsewhere, such as by Lorenzo Monaco’s Coronation of the Virgin, now in the Uffizi.

One of the abbots was theologian Ambrose Traversari who assisted Niccolò de' Niccoli in acquiring the manuscripts that would later make up the library at San Marco, the first public library in Europe.

== The Rotunda ==
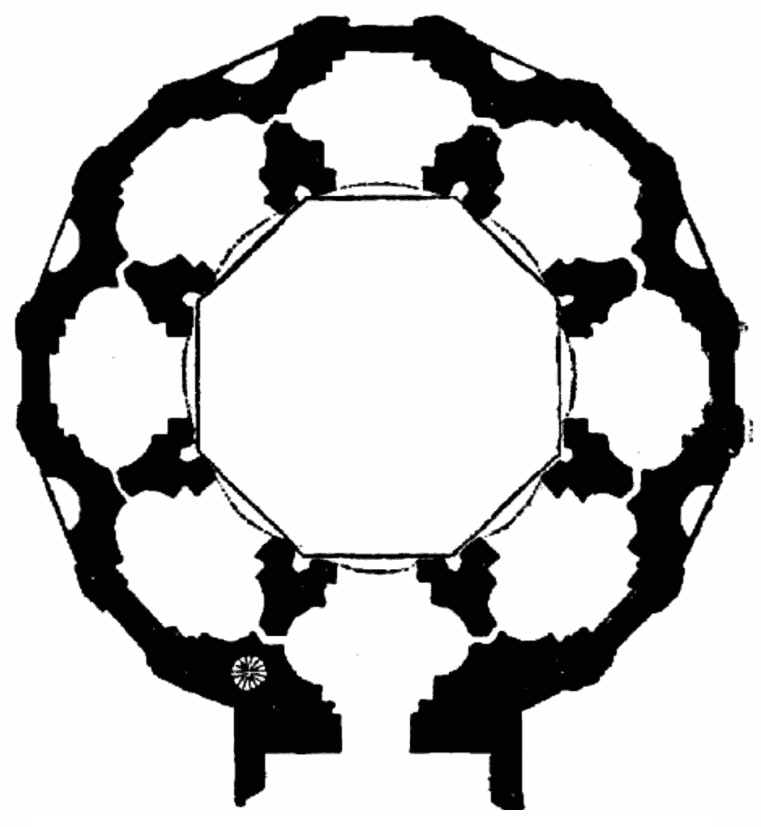
Floor plan of the Rotunda

The so-called Rotonda degli Scolari, partially built by Filippo Brunelleschi, is part of the complex. In 1434, Brunelleschi was commissioned by the Medici family to design an oratory for the monastery. It was located at the corner of the property, along the outer wall. Though construction was rapid, it was halted due to funding problems in 1437, when the money for the church was seized by the Florentine government to help finance a war against the neighboring city of Lucca. In 1503, the shell was given a simple wooden roof, but the structure deteriorated rapidly. The building, which was used for various purposes, was patched up and given its modern appearance in the 1930s. It was given to the university and thus its more modern name Rotonda degli Scolari ("Scholars' Rotunda").

Copies of original plans and descriptions give us a good indication of Brunelleschi's intentions. The building was to have an octagonal, domed space at its core, surrounded by eight ancillary spaces. Though the outside - as it was restored - has little similarity with what Brunelleschi intended, on the inside one can see how some of the original spaces were arranged.

== See also ==
- Late medieval domes
