= Coronation of the Virgin (Fra Angelico, Louvre) =

Altarpiece by Fra Angelico

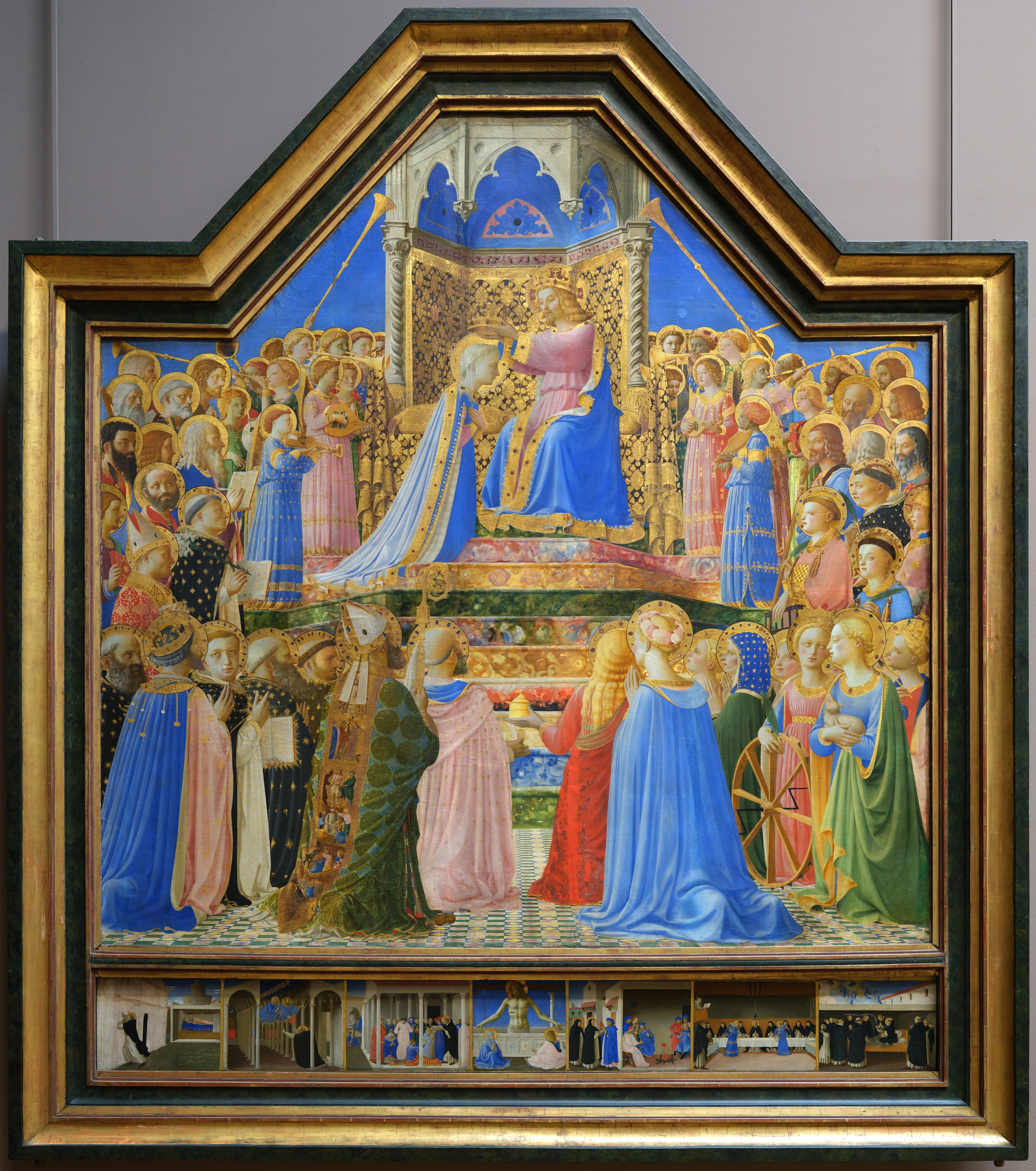
- Artist: Fra Angelico
- Year: c. 1434–1435
- Medium: Tempera on panel
- Dimensions: 213 cm × 211 cm (84 in × 83 in)
- Location: Musée du Louvre, Paris

The Coronation of the Virgin is a painting by the Italian early Renaissance painter Fra Angelico, executed around 1434–1435 in Fiesole (Florence). It is now in the Musée du Louvre of Paris, France. The artist executed another Coronation of the Virgin (c. 1432), now in the Uffizi in Florence.

== History ==
The work is thought to have originally been painted around 1434 (a few years after the similar painting in the Uffizi) for the convent of San Domenico of Fiesole, near Florence, where Fra Angelico was a Dominican friar and for which he painted also the Fiesole Altarpiece (1424–1425) and the Annunciation now at the Museo del Prado. Some art historians, such as John Pope-Hennessy, date it instead to Angelico's visit to Rome (1450).

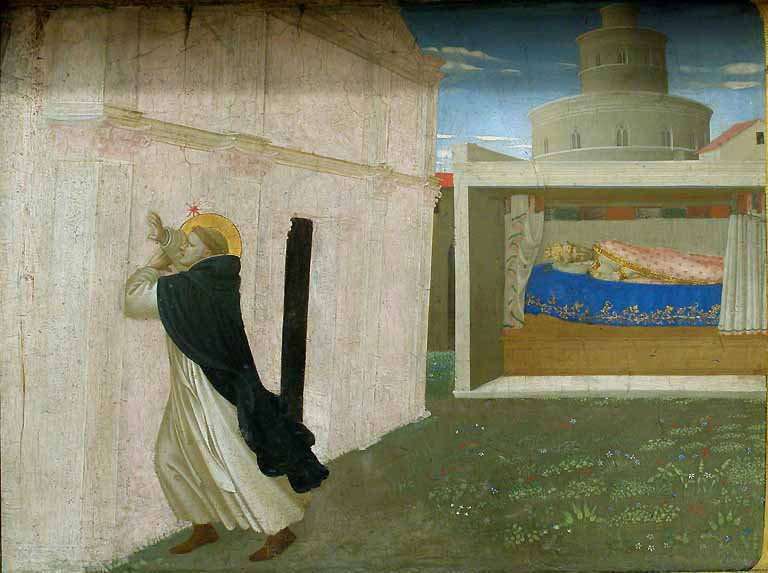
Detail of the predella with the Dream of Innocent III.

The painting was brought to France as a result of the pillages of the Napoleonic Wars. Like several other artworks, it was not given back with the excuse of its large size.

== Description ==
The work shows several differences from the earlier Coronation now at the Uffizi. The gilded background has disappeared, replaced by a more realistic light blue sky. The composition is more advanced, perhaps inspired to the innovation introduced by Masaccio. Angelico here depicts a rich cyborium with Gothic triple mullions, supported by a series of polychrome marble steps, as the set of the Incoronation. Elements such as the twisted columns show similarities with the tabernacles painted in the frescoes of the Niccoline Chapel in Rome.

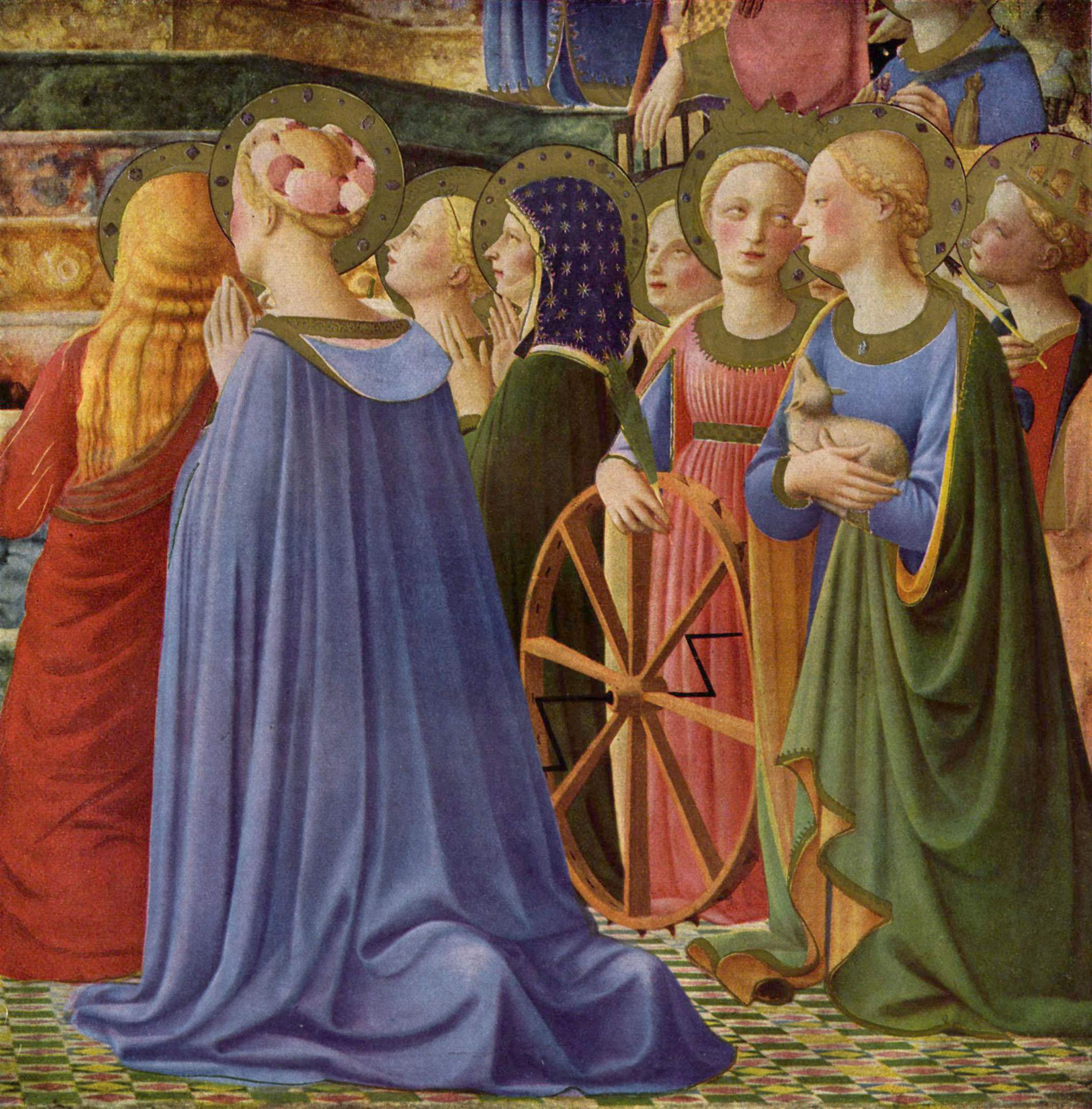
Detail.

Such as in the Florence painting, the angels and the saints form the audience at the side of the central scene, but the figures are more defined and some are shown from back, and the pavement's tiles are painted according to geometrical perspective. Pope-Hennessy supposed that the angels were influenced by those in the San Brizio Chapel of Orvieto Cathedral (1447).

The work was executed with the extensive help of assistants, especially in the right side: for example, St. Catherine's wheel is painted approximatively, and some of the saints in this side have less expressive faces.

The painting has a predella with scenes portraying the Miracles of St. Dominic and, in the middle, the Resurrection of Christ. Such as in other Angelico's work, the predella scenes show an extensive use of geometrical perspective, enhanced by the use of alternatively empty and full architectures.

== Sources ==
- Pope-Hennessy, John (1981). Beato Angelico. Florence: Scala.
- Cornini, Guido (2000). Beato Angelico. Florence: Giunti. ISBN 88-09-01602-5.
