= St. Mary of the Angels Monastery (Florence) =

Monastery in Florence, Italy

The Monastery of St. Mary of the Angels (Italian: Monastero di S. Maria degli Angeli) was a monastery of the Camaldolese Order in Florence, Italy.

== History ==
During the early part of the Renaissance, this monastery was known for the high-quality manuscripts and other works created by its scriptorium. Many of the illuminations from these works are found in museum collections around the world. (Note: The bulk of an exhibition of illuminated art at the Metropolitan Museum of Art in New York in 1995 consisted of the illustrations cut out from manuscripts produced by this monastery) Strongly tied to most powerful families of Florentine society, the monks took part in the artistic flourishing in the city in that era, and they were able to produce works in the High Gothic art of the Sienese School.

Additionally, the greatest artists of the city worked to decorate the monastery. Among them was Nardo di Cione.

It was in this monastery that the famed artist, Lorenzo Monaco (Lorenzo the Monk), entered monastic life. He kept this title, despite the fact that he chose not to take religious vows as a monk, and returned to secular life. Even after his departure, Lorenzo continued to contribute to the beautification of the monastery with his art.

Monks executed a variety of tasks and obligations which took place throughout the year. Among these was a lengthy and solemn procession, held on specific feast days, that took the community to every altar and altarpiece in the monastic complex. The route they took and the images they saw caused each monk to see this collection of images in sequence, and thus encouraged him to consider the altarpieces both individually and collectively. The culmination of this procession came to be the extraordinary high altarpiece produced by Lorenzo Monaco in 1413, the Coronation of the Virgin, which summarized the entire program of monastic imagery.
