= Annunciation Triptych (Lorenzo Monaco) =

Painting by Lorenzo Monaco

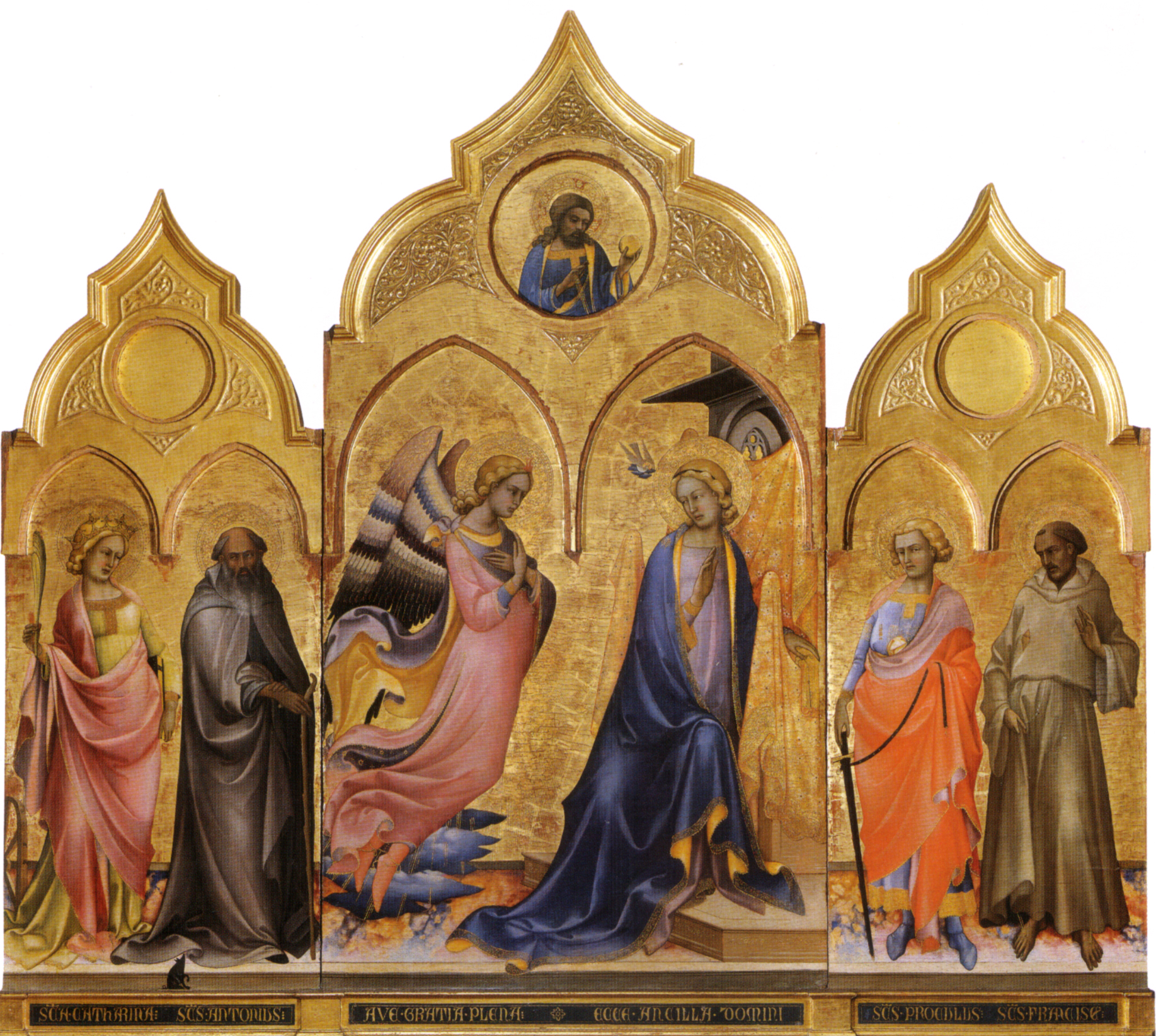
- Artist: Lorenzo Monaco
- Year: c. 1410–1415
- Medium: Tempera on panel
- Dimensions: 130 cm × 230 cm (51 in × 91 in)
- Location: Gallerie dell'Accademia, Florence

The Annunciation Triptych is a tempera on panel painting by the Italian late Gothic artist Lorenzo Monaco, now housed in the Gallerie dell'Accademia in Florence, Italy.

== History ==
The triptych was commissioned for the church of San Procolo of Florence, where Renaissance art historian Giorgio Vasari saw it, but attributed it to Giotto. It was recognized as a work by Lorenzo Monaco by Giovanni Battista Cavalcaselle in 1864. It has been variously dated from 1408 to 1418.

The work had originally different cusps, perhaps with heads of prophets, and a predella, which is now lost.

== Description ==
The painting includes compartments divided into two panels surmounted by cusps, each sharing a golden background. The central painting depicts the Virgin, on a throne barely visible under her dress and a hovering Angel of the Annunciation on the left. Behind her are parts of a house, including a double mullioned window, while next to her head is the Holy Ghost dove.

The drapes feature intricate arabesques, perhaps influenced by the International Gothic style introduced by Gherardo Starnina and Lorenzo Ghiberti.

== Sources ==
- D. Parenti and A. Tartuferi, ed. (2007). Intorno a Lorenzo Monaco. Nuovi studi sulla pittura tardogotica. Livorno: Sillabe.
