= Augusto Burchi =

Italian painter (1853–1919)

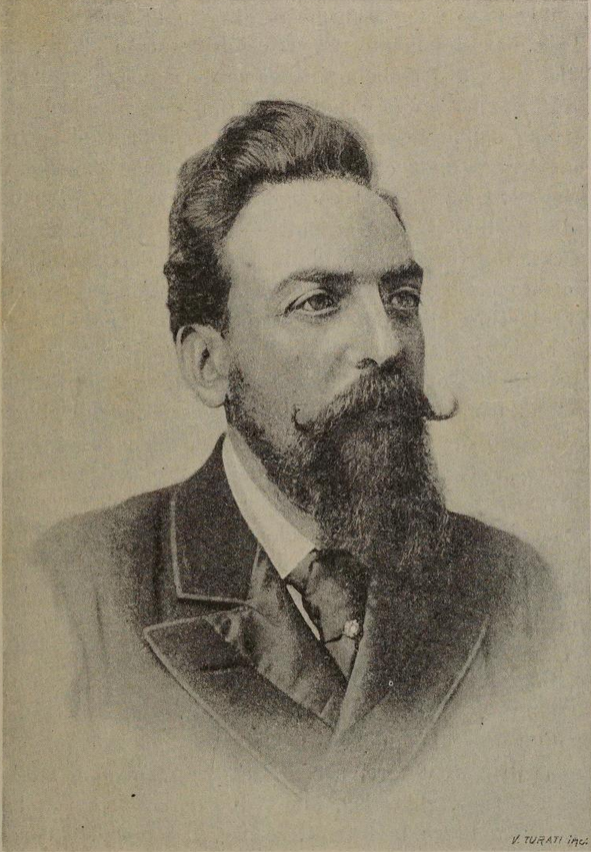
Portrait of Augusto Burchi, ca. 1893

Augusto Burchi (February 12, 1853 – 1919) was an Italian painter born in Florence.

Due to the indigence of his family, he was never formally trained in an academy. He worked under Gaetano Bianchi in many restorations and decorations in Florence, including in the Palazzo Vecchio and the Palazzo Medici-Riccardi. He worked in Cosenza with Federico Andreotti. Most of his painting was decorative and painted on site on walls or architecture.
