= Coronation of the Virgin (Lorenzo Monaco) =

Painting by Lorenzo Monaco

The Coronation of the Virgin
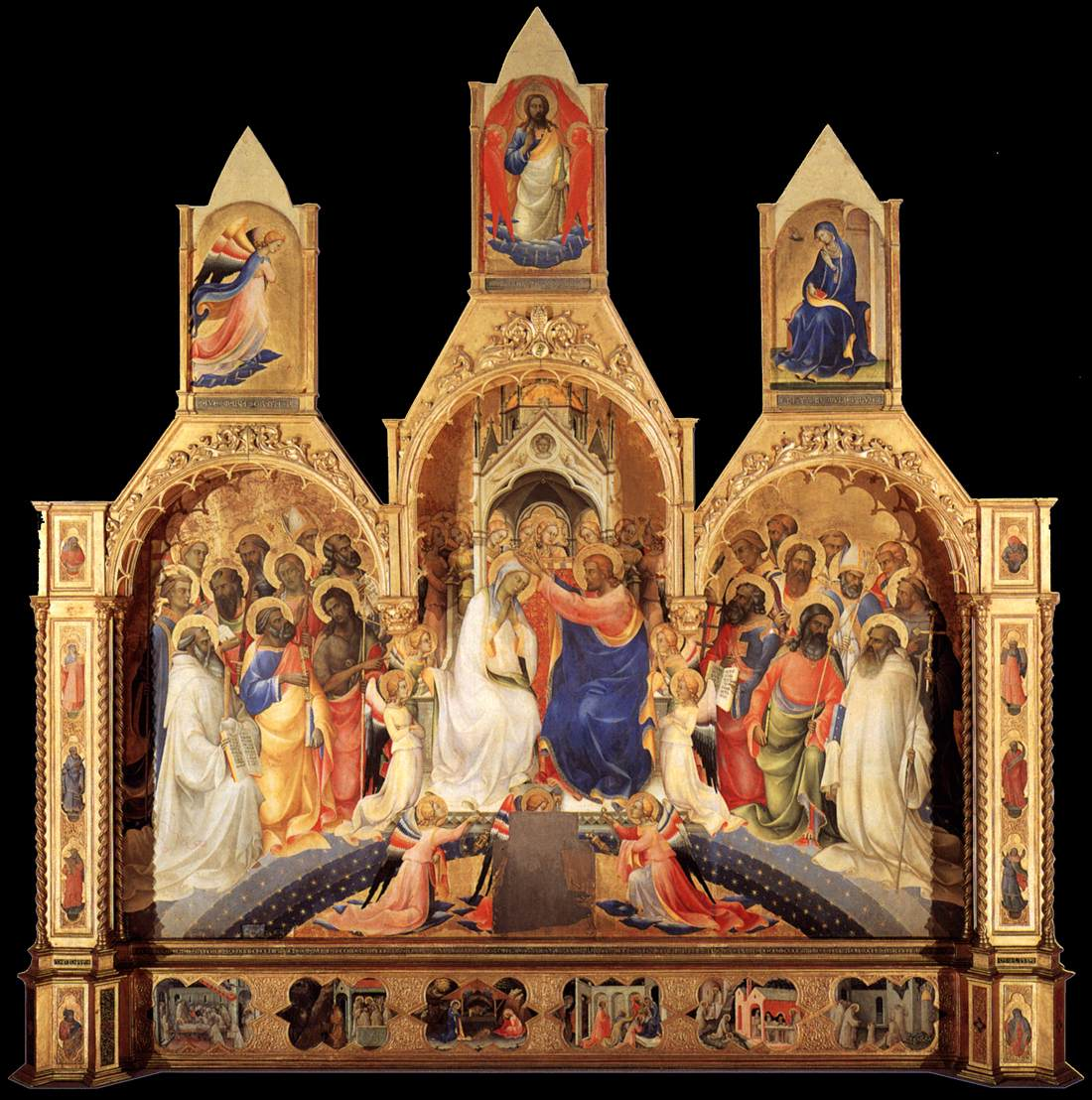
- Artist: Lorenzo Monaco
- Year: 1414
- Medium: Tempera on panel
- Dimensions: 506 cm × 447.5 cm (199 in × 176.2 in)
- Location: Uffizi Gallery, Florence

The Coronation of the Virgin is a 1414 tempera-on-panel polyptych by the Italian late Gothic artist Lorenzo Monaco, centred on the subject of the Coronation of the Virgin. Once in the Camaldolese monastery of Santa Maria degli Angeli, it is now housed in the Uffizi Gallery in Florence. It is dated February 1413 which, in the Florentine calendar (which began in March), corresponded to 1414.

== History ==
The painting is mentioned in the early 15th century by Antonio Billi.

In the late 16th century, it was replaced in the altar it occupied by a large canvas by Alessandro Allori. The Coronation was rediscovered in the 19th century, when it was housed in the Camaldolese abbey of San Pietro a Cerreto, in poor condition. In 1872 it was restored to its frame. In 1990 the painted part was found to contain the precious and (for the time) expensive use of lapis lazuli blue.

== Description ==
The work is in a huge gilded and carved frame, with three cusps covered placed on jutting corbels. The three arches are decorated with vegetable motifs; over them are three panels (whose upper frame is lost), containing the paintings, from the left, of the Angel of the Annunciation, the Blessing Christ between Cherubim and the Annunciation. At the side are two piers with twisting columns on the edges, with paintings of prophets. In the lower part is the predella, with six small paintings of the Episodes of the Lives of St. Benedict and St. Bernard of Clairvaux.

The central painting within the three arcades shows the Coronation of the Virgin set in Paradise (alluded by the blue starred belts), with two rows of saints at the sides and a large number of angels behind the throne of Jesus and the Madonna.

The composition is crowded but, like other Giottoesque paintings, lacks perspective. The gilded background is typical of Lorenzo's style.

== Sources ==
- Fossi, Gloria (2004). Uffizi. Florence: Giunti. ISBN 88-09-03675-1.
