= Adoration of the Magi (Lorenzo Monaco) =

Painting by Lorenzo Monaco

The Adoration of the Magi
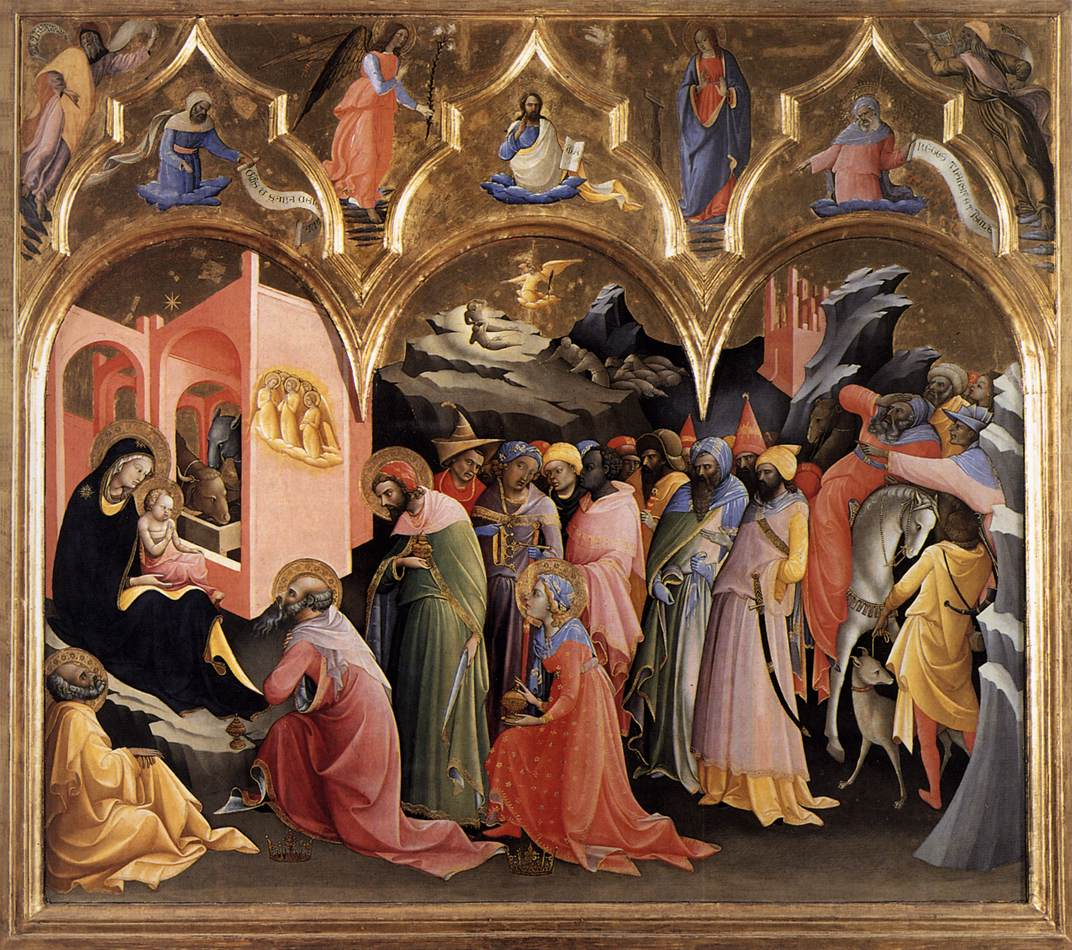
- Artist: Lorenzo Monaco
- Year: c. 1420–1422
- Medium: Tempera on panel
- Dimensions: 115 cm × 183 cm (45 in × 72 in)
- Location: Uffizi Gallery, Florence

The Adoration of the Magi is a tempera painting on panel by the Italian late Gothic artist Lorenzo Monaco, created c. 1420–1422. It is now housed in the Uffizi Gallery in Florence.

== History ==
The painting is known by a rather complete documentation. It was executed by Lorenzo with the help of three assistants, and, despite the reduced size, he was paid the huge sum of 182 florins. According to some hints in Giorgio Vasari's Lives of the Most Excellent Painters, it could have been executed for the church of Sant'Egidio in Florence, when it was reconsecrated by Pope Martin V.

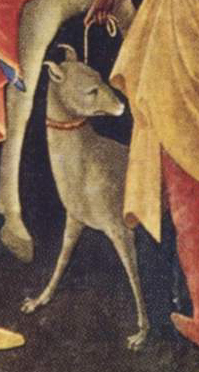
Detail of the hound.

Later it is documented in a room facing the cloister of the monastery of San Marco, where it was seen by Fra Angelico. A source from 1810 reports how the work was initially attributed to Fra Angelico himself.

It was restored in 1995.

== Description ==
The painting includes a large composition with a rather reduced use of a gilded background, a typical element of most of Lorenzo's works. The upper part is in the form of a frame creating a triptych.

On the left is portrayed the nativity scene, within an architecture showing Lorenzo's refusal of the contemporary introduction of geometrical perspective in art. The Madonna, wearing a dark blue garment with three stars (symbols of virginity), is sitting on a stone and showing the Christ child to the spectators. Saint Joseph is sitting in the lower left corner and looking upwards.

The centre and right scenes are occupied by the Magi's procession. Differently from the Gospel tradition, they are not all portrayed as old men, but with three different ages symbolizing the ages of man. Their followers include a variety of ethnicities, from the Moors to the Tatars, as well as animals such as hounds and camels. In the upper part is a landscape of Giottoesque inspiration. The garments of the standing Magi and the one next to him have writing in Arabic.

In the cusps are a Blessing Redeemer and, in the middle, two prophets. In the 15th century between the cusps were added two further prophets and an Annunciation, partly executed by Cosimo Rosselli.

== Sources ==
- Fossi, Gloria (2004). Uffizi. Florence: Giunti. ISBN 88-09-03675-1.
