= Lorenzo Monaco =

Italian painter (c. 1370 – c. 1425)

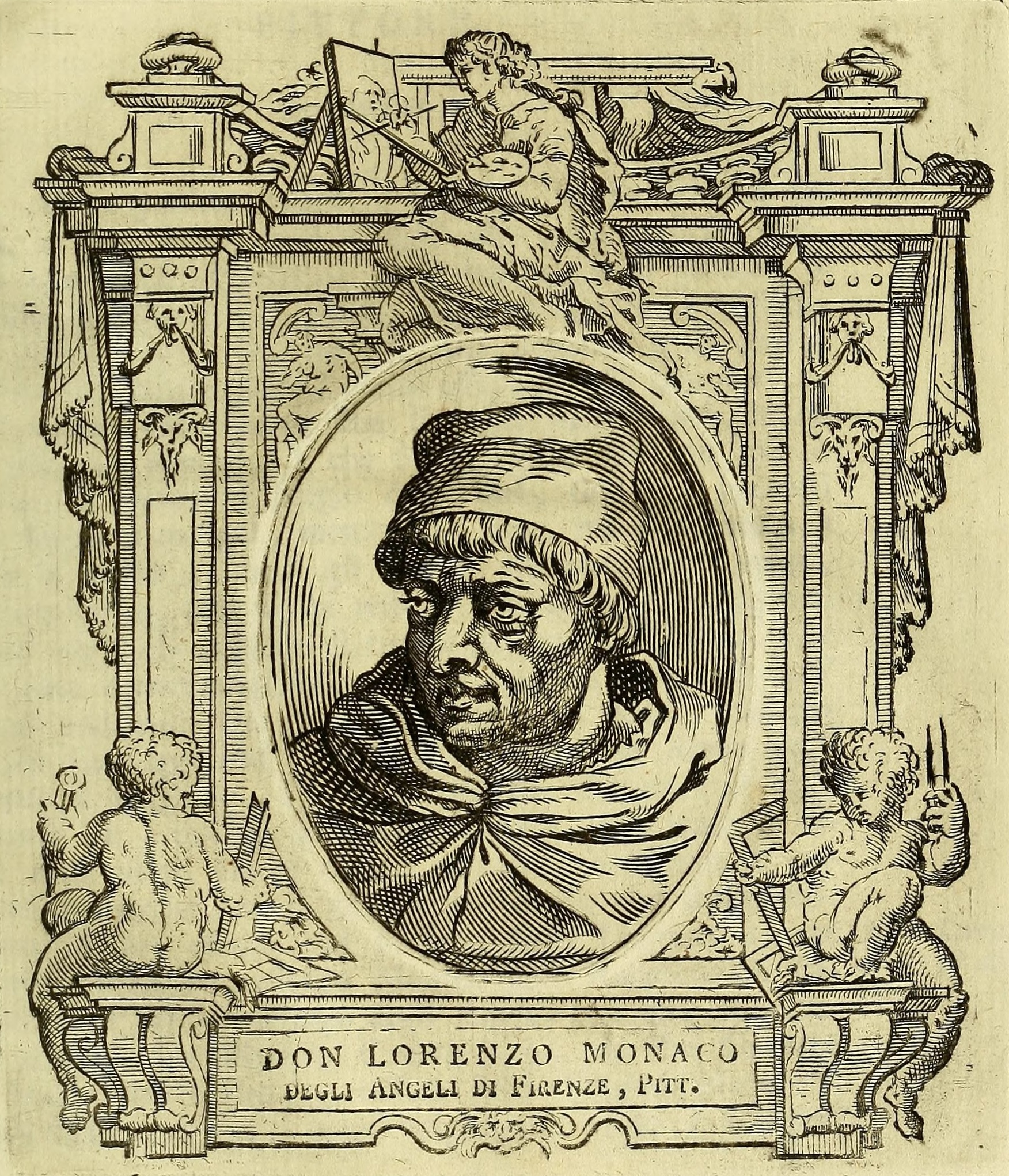
- Lorenzo Monaco, in the Lives of Giorgio Vasari
- Born: Piero di Giovanni c. 1370; Siena, Republic of Siena
- Died: c. 1425; Florence, Republic of Florence
- Occupations: Painter, miniaturist

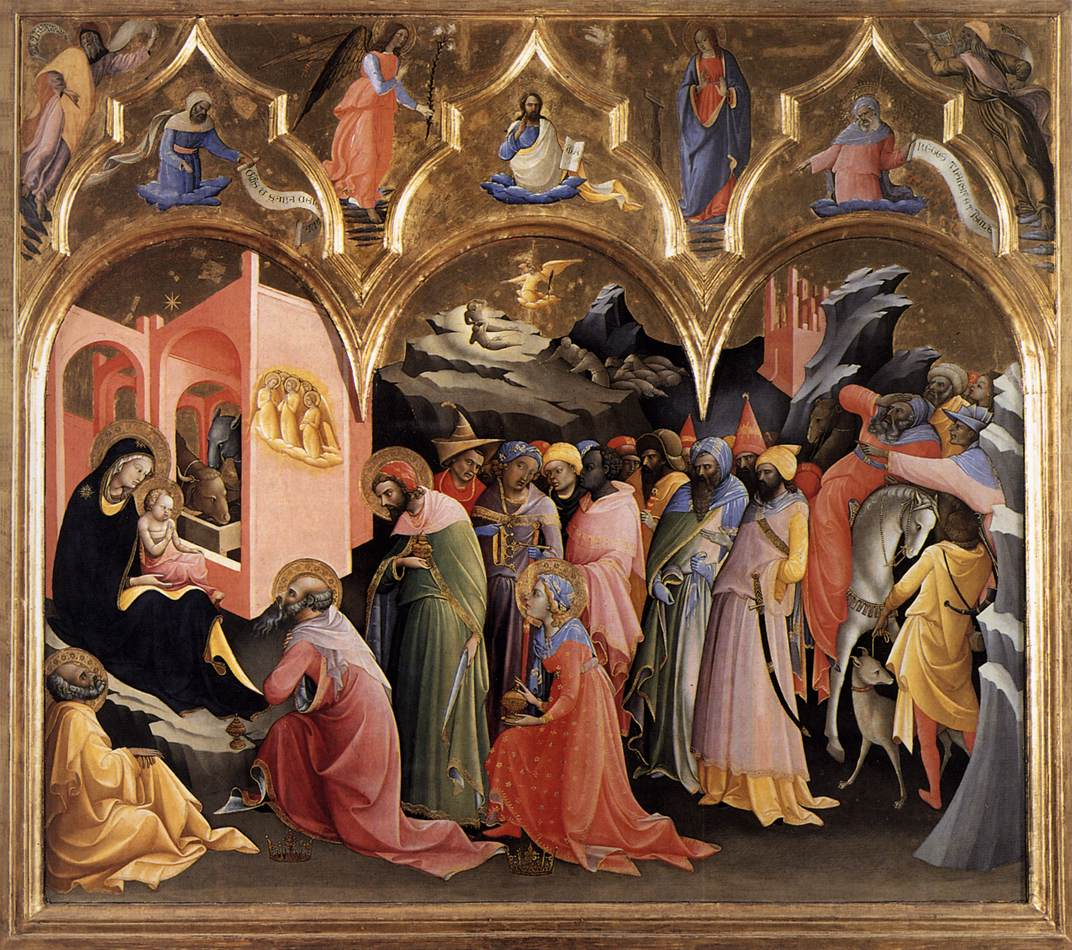
Adoration of the Magi, c. 1420–1422, Uffizi, Florence

Lorenzo Monaco (c.1370 – c.1425) was a Sienese painter and miniaturist of the late Gothic to early Renaissance age, active principally in Florence. He was born Piero di Giovanni. Little is known about his youth, apart from the fact that he was apprenticed in Florence. He has been considered the last important exponent of the Giotto style, before the Renaissance revolution that came with Fra Angelico and Masaccio.

== Life ==
He was probably born in Florence and not in Siena, as it was believed until recently. Nothing is known of his early years, but he was certainly trained in painting in Florence. Formed in the same tradition as Giotto, he was influenced not only by him but also by that artist's followers Spinello Aretino and Agnolo Gaddi. He later worked with Gaddi in painting the predella of the altarpiece in the Nobili Chapel in Santa Maria degli Angeli.

In 1390 he entered the Camaldolese monastery of Santa Maria degli Angeli, as a novice, where he took his vows in 1391. Here he worked for a long time as an illuminator in the scriptorium and as a panel painter, consecrating himself at the time as the greatest painter of sacred subjects in Florence. The three chorales in the Laurentian Library date back to the last decade of the 14th century, and were executed for his own Camaldolese monastery, already perceive a personal style, characterized by taut linearism and a cold chromatic range.

Starting from around 1404, his style shows the influence of the International Gothic, influenced by the first works of Lorenzo Ghiberti and of Gherardo Starnina, who had returned in those years from Spain. From that year, stands out The Pietà in the Galleria dell'Accademia of Florence, a work dominated by a nervous line and a certain emotional tension. In the numerous paintings with a gold background, he created a style characterized by extremely elongated figures, with the sinuous lines of the crescent-shaped drapery, sharp edges, the bright and rich colors (profusion of gold and lapis lazuli), the hinted gestures, and an almost annulled space. His works, in general, showed images with a strong spiritual value, detached from reality, where the profane and naturalistic elements are usually almost completely absent.

From this period, among others, can be mentioned the Tabernacle with the Madonna, Child and Saints, at the Pinacoteca di Siena, and the beautiful Oration in the Garden of the Galleria dell'Accademia, in Florence. The sumptuous Coronation of the Virgin of the National Gallery, in London, one of his most famous works dates to 1407-1409. The Polyptych of Monteoliveto, in the Galleria dell'Accademia is slightly later, and it is imbued with a spirituality that even preludes Fra Angelico. In the same museum is the Triptych of San Procolo where are already notice the wavy rhythms, like the arabesques of an illuminated codex, which appear again in the Coronation of the Virgin (now at the Uffizi), composed with a great number of saints of sinuous shapes, and with brilliant colors that reach their peak in the blinding white of the Virgin's dress and in the ultramarine blue of Christ's mantle, seemingly in an authentic irradiation of divine light.

The numerous commissions that he took, led him to request several times dispensations to leave the monastery, which were regularly granted by his superiors, but Lorenzo never forgot his monastic status.

In the last phase of his production, he did not follow the innovations of his contemporaries Masaccio and Filippo Brunelleschi. Although he knew how to update his style with some innovations, especially concerning a more realistic representation of space, he always remained faithful to his personal style, without radical changes. A typical work of this time is the Adoration of the Magi of 1420–1422, where the foreshortenings seem markedly incoherent and surreal precisely because the now widespread geometrical perspective is totally absent. However, the pictorial quality remains very high, with an original use of the contour line, which creates one of the most imaginative results of all Florentine painting.

Lorenzo's works remained popular in the 1420s, as testified by the numerous commissions he received, such as the Stories of the Virgin in the Bartolini Salimbeni Chapel of Santa Trinita, one of his few frescoes.

Giorgio Vasari, who included his biography in his Lives, states that he died at the age of fifty-five, from an unidentified infection, perhaps an infected pustule, gangrene or a tumor, which had forced him to bed for many months. He was buried in the chapter house of the monastery, a privilege usually reserved only for high religious offices and famous personalities, further proof of the great esteem in which he was held in his lifetime.

His production was also very vast in miniature, where he achieved results of great value both at a creative and at a formal level. He also composed musical chants. Many manuscripts illuminated by him are kept in the Biblioteca Medicea Laurenziana.

== Selected works ==
His works include:

- Coronation of the Virgin (1388–1390), Courtauld Gallery, London
- Madonna and Child with Saints (1395–1402)
- Episodes in the Life of Saint Benedict (c. 1407–1409)
- Nativity (1409), a panel believed to form part of a predella
- Coronation of the Virgin (1414), also for Santa Maria degli Angeli
- Annunciation Triptych (1410–1415), Galleria dell'Accademia, Florence
- Bartolini Salimbeni Chapel (1410–1415), Santa Trinita, Florence
- Adoration of the Magi (1422), Uffizi, Florence
- Beheading of St Paul, Princeton University Art Museum
- Processional Cross, Chicago Art Institute
- Crucifixion of St Peter, Walters Art Museum, Baltimore
- Madonna and Child, National Gallery of Art, Washington, D.C.
- Madonna of Humility, Treasure Museum of the Basilica of Saint Francis, Assisi
- Virgin and Child, Scottish National Gallery, Edinburgh

== Paintings ==
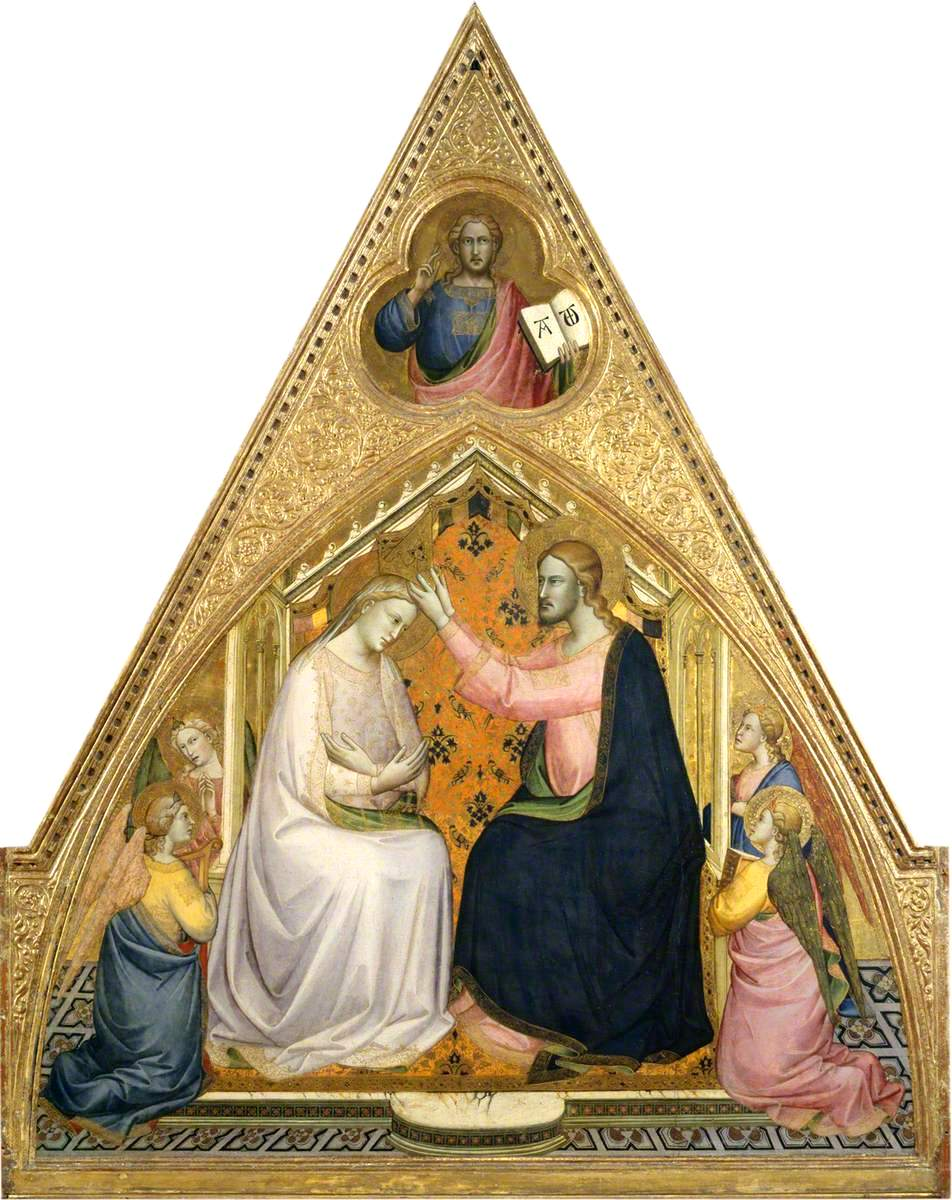
Coronation of the Virgin, c. 1388–1390, Courtauld Gallery, London

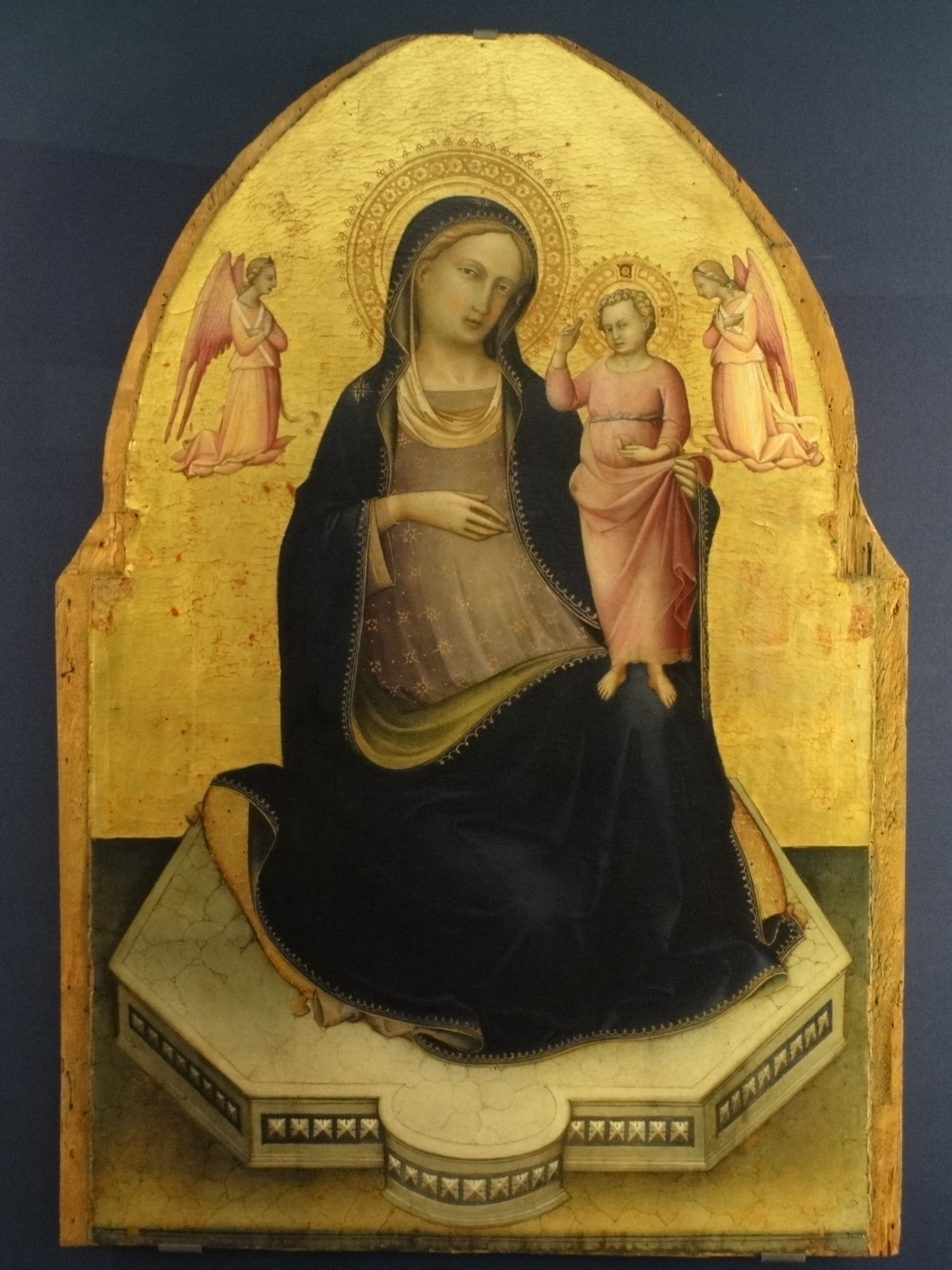
Madonna of Humility, Treasure Museum of the Basilica of St. Francis in Assisi

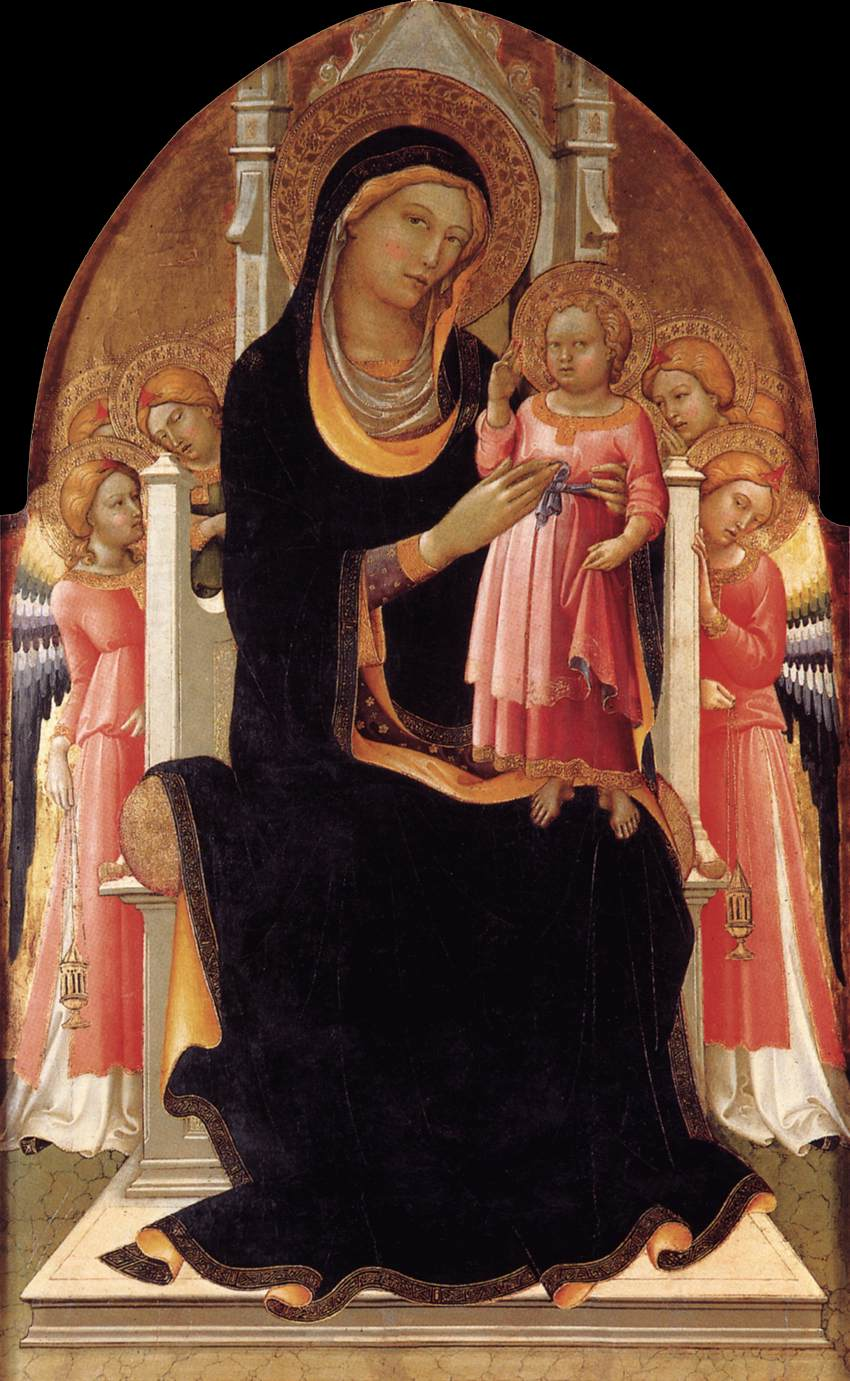
Virgin and Child with Six Angels, c. 1415–1420

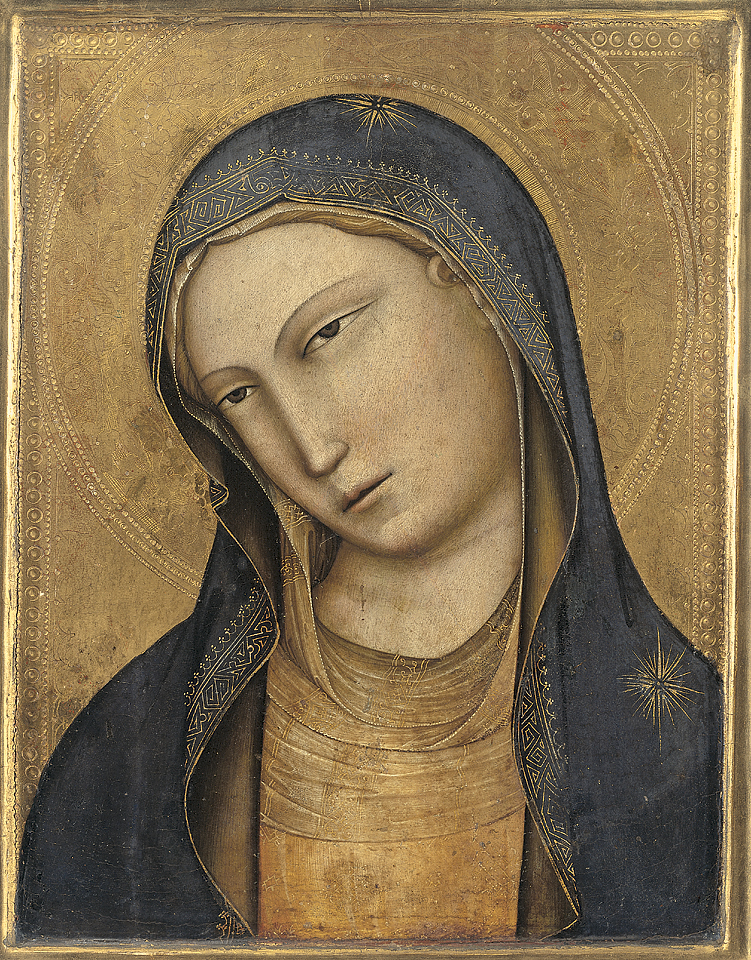
Madonna, c. 1381–1425, Rijksmuseum, Amsterdam

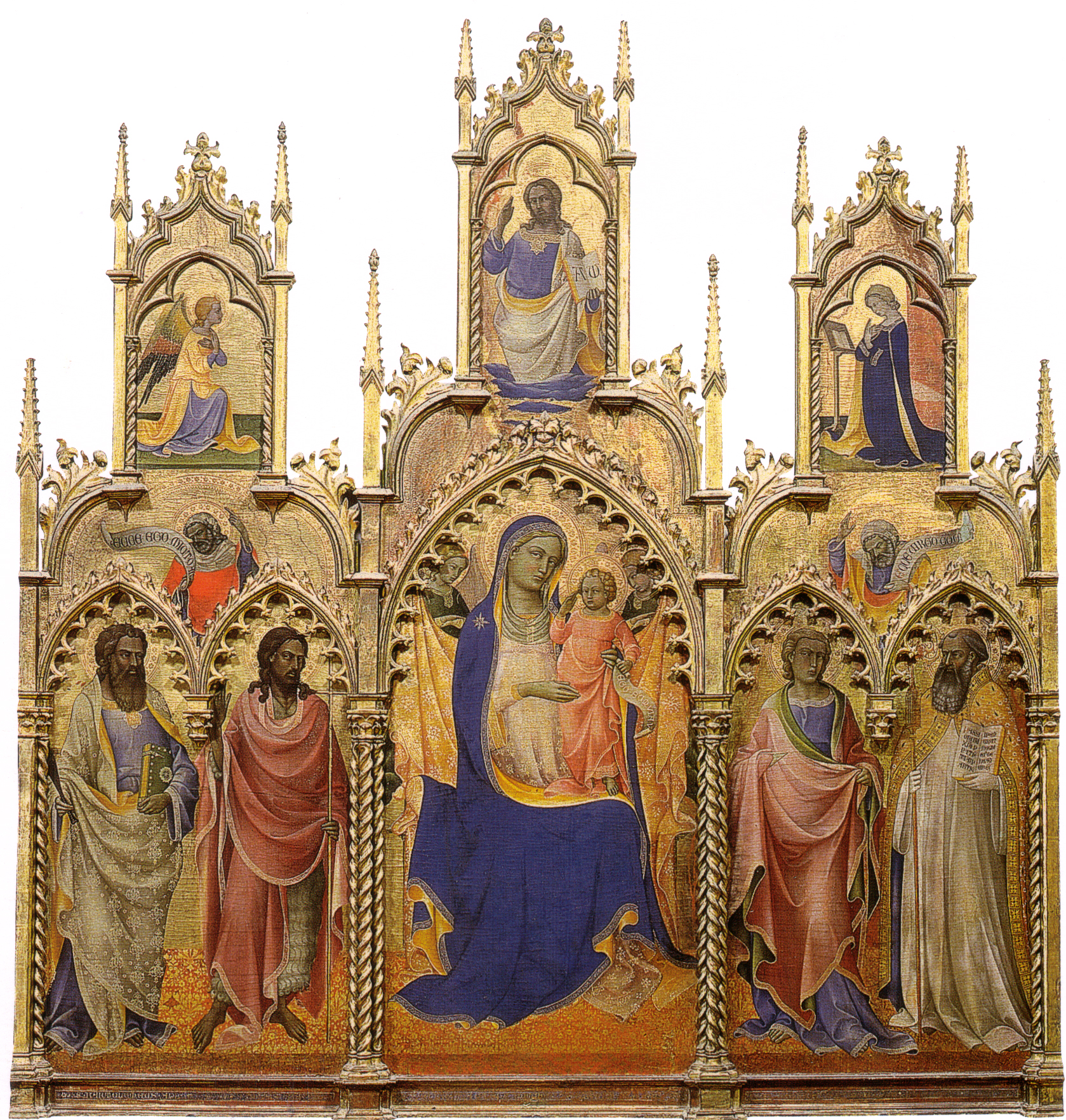
Polyptych of the Madonna Enthroned with Saints, 1410, Galleria dell'Accademia, Florence

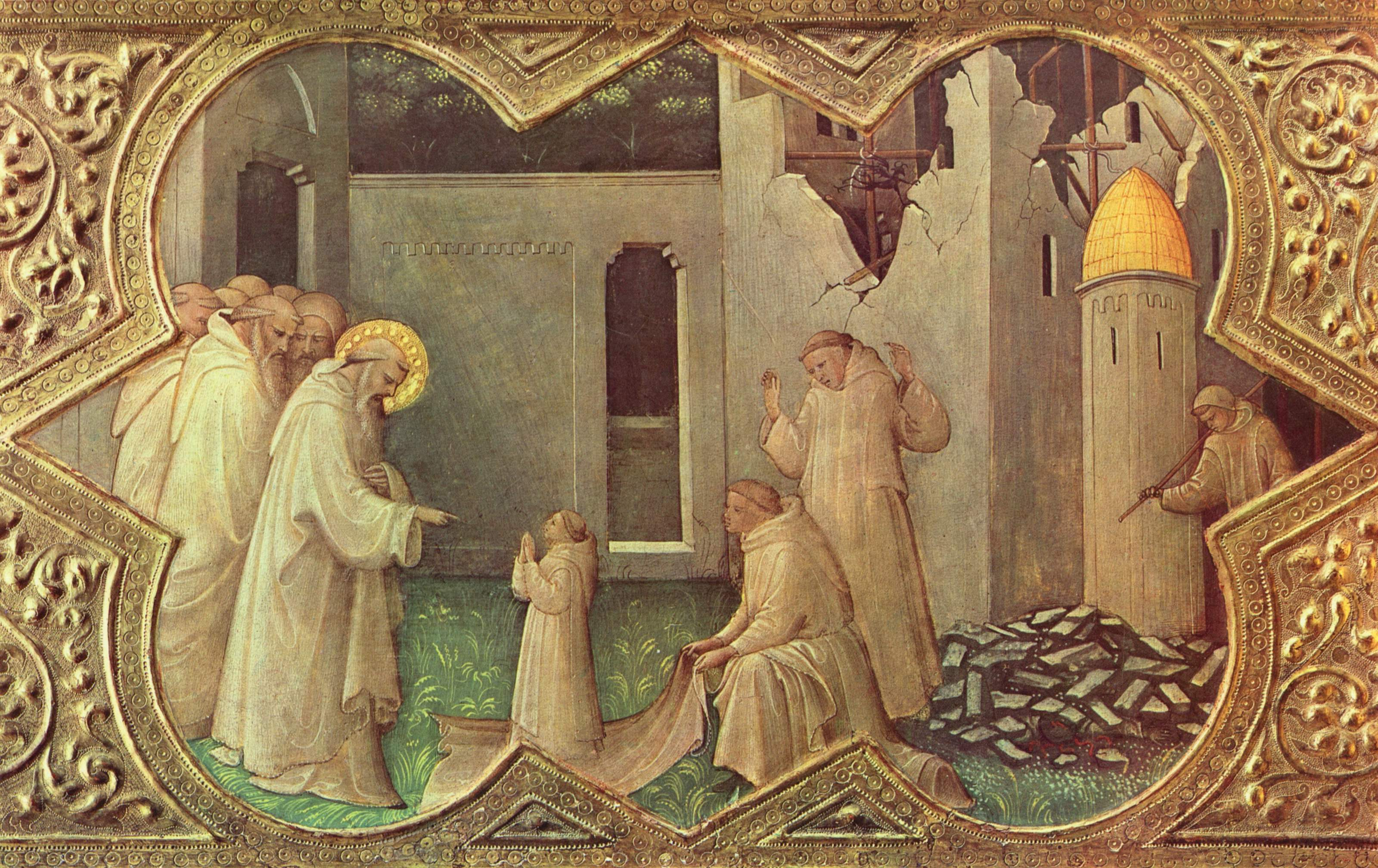
Scene from the Life of St. Benedict, c. 1413–1414

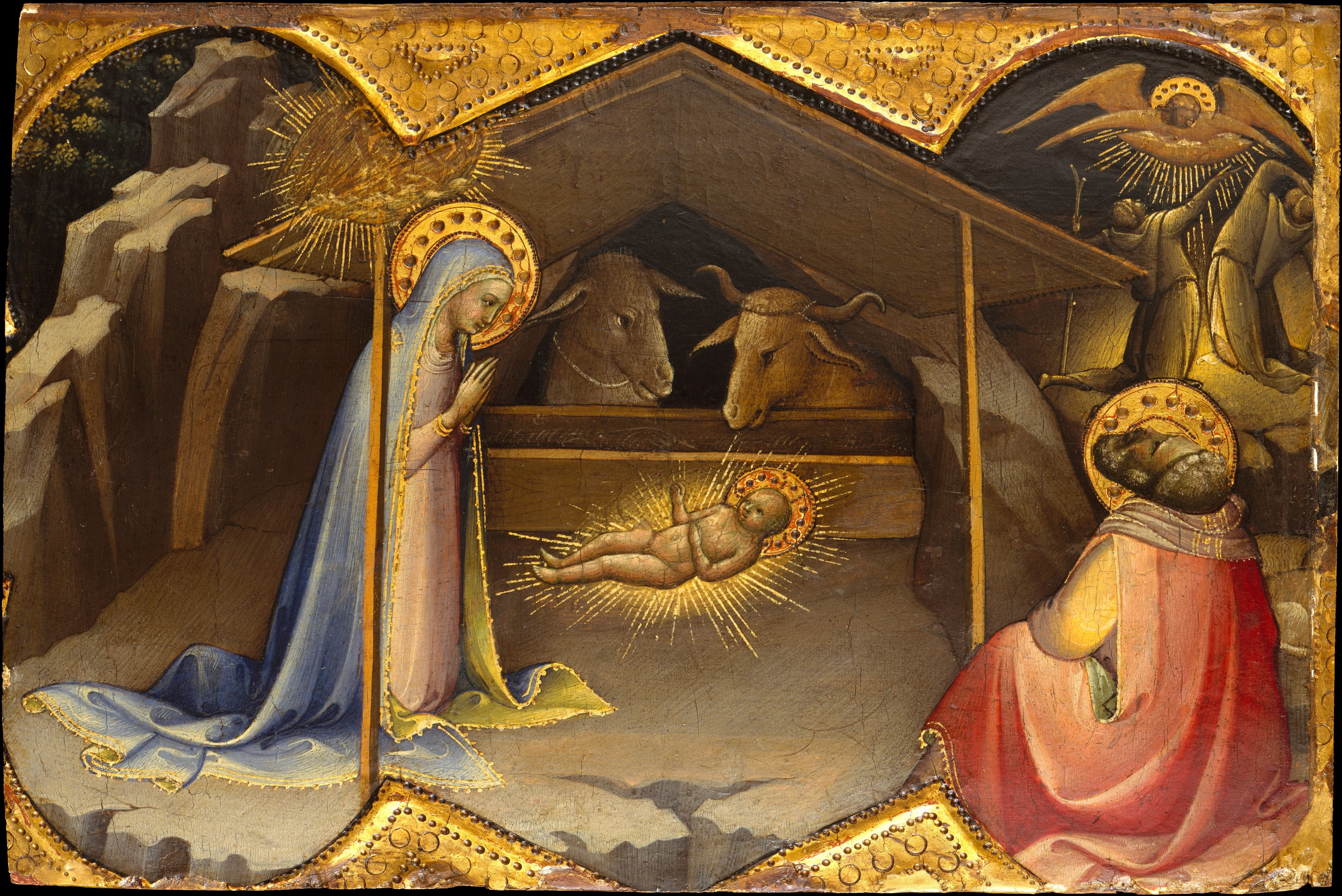
Nativity, c. 1406–1410

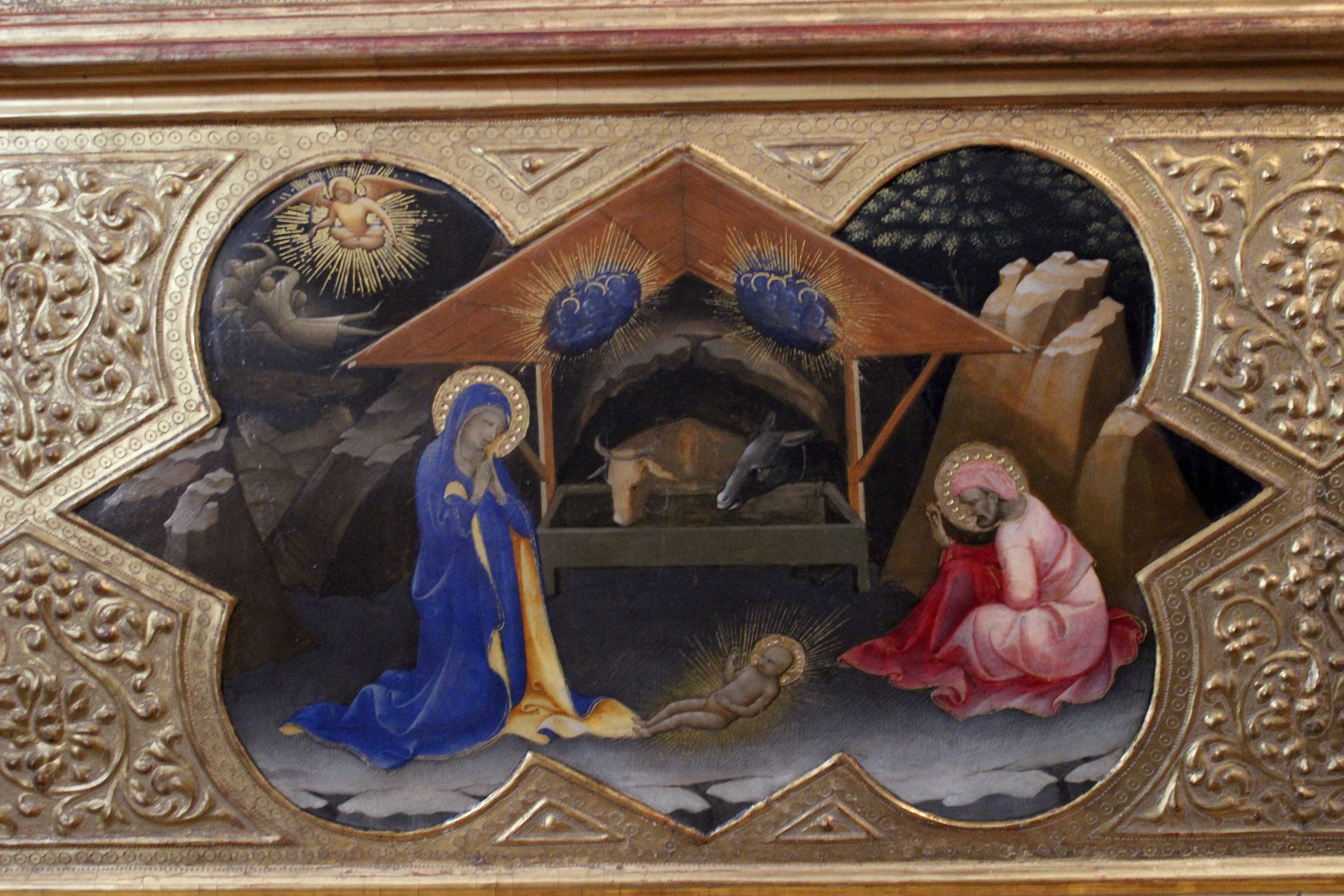
Nativity, 1414

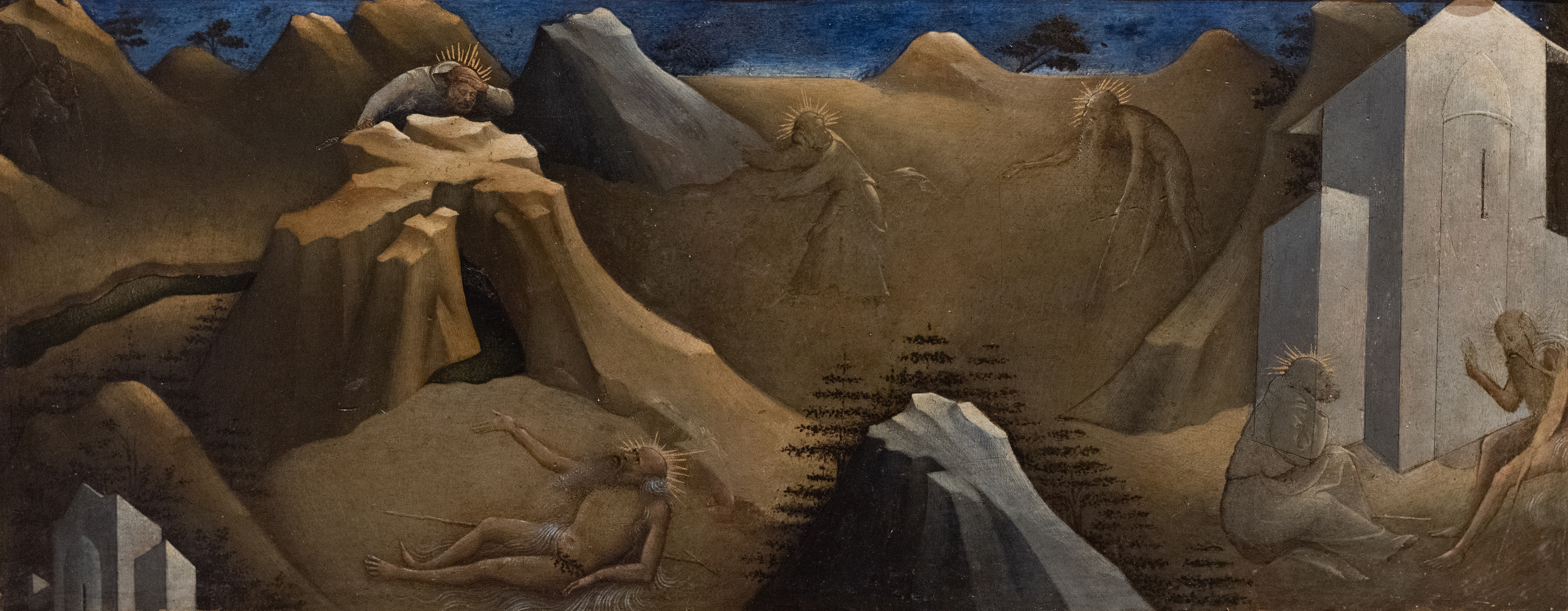
Paphnutius of Thebes, Deposition of Christ altarpiece predella

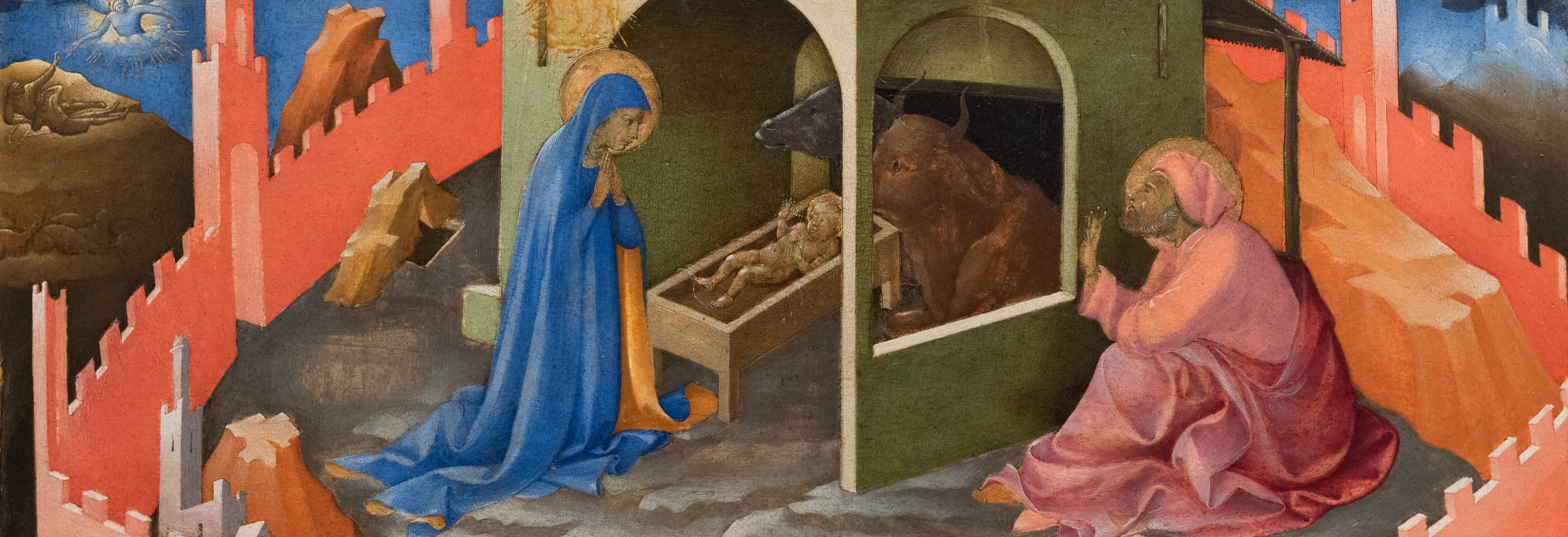
Nativity, Deposition of Christ altarpiece predella

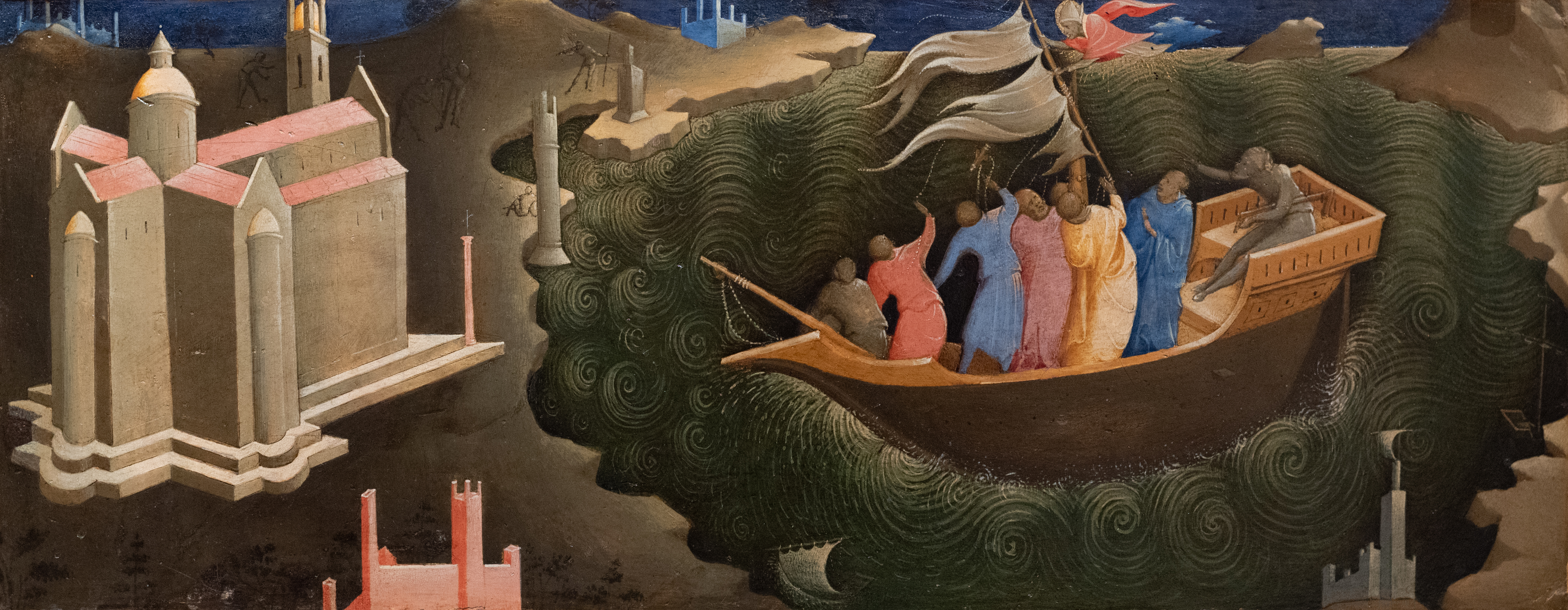
St. Nicholas of Myra Calming the Storm, Deposition of Christ altarpiece predella

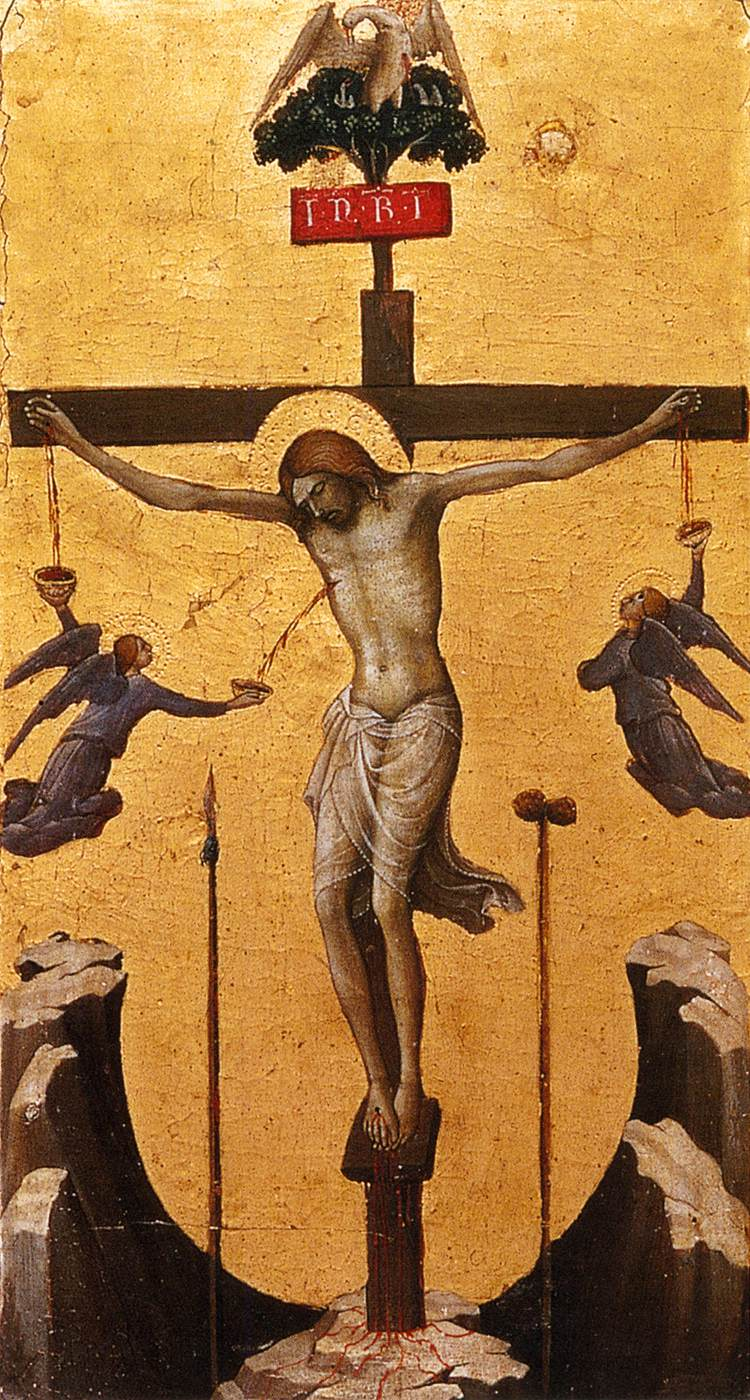
Crucifixion, c. 1405–1410

== See also ==
- Sienese School
