= San Pietro Martire Triptych =

Painting by Fra Angelico

St. Peter of Verona Triptych
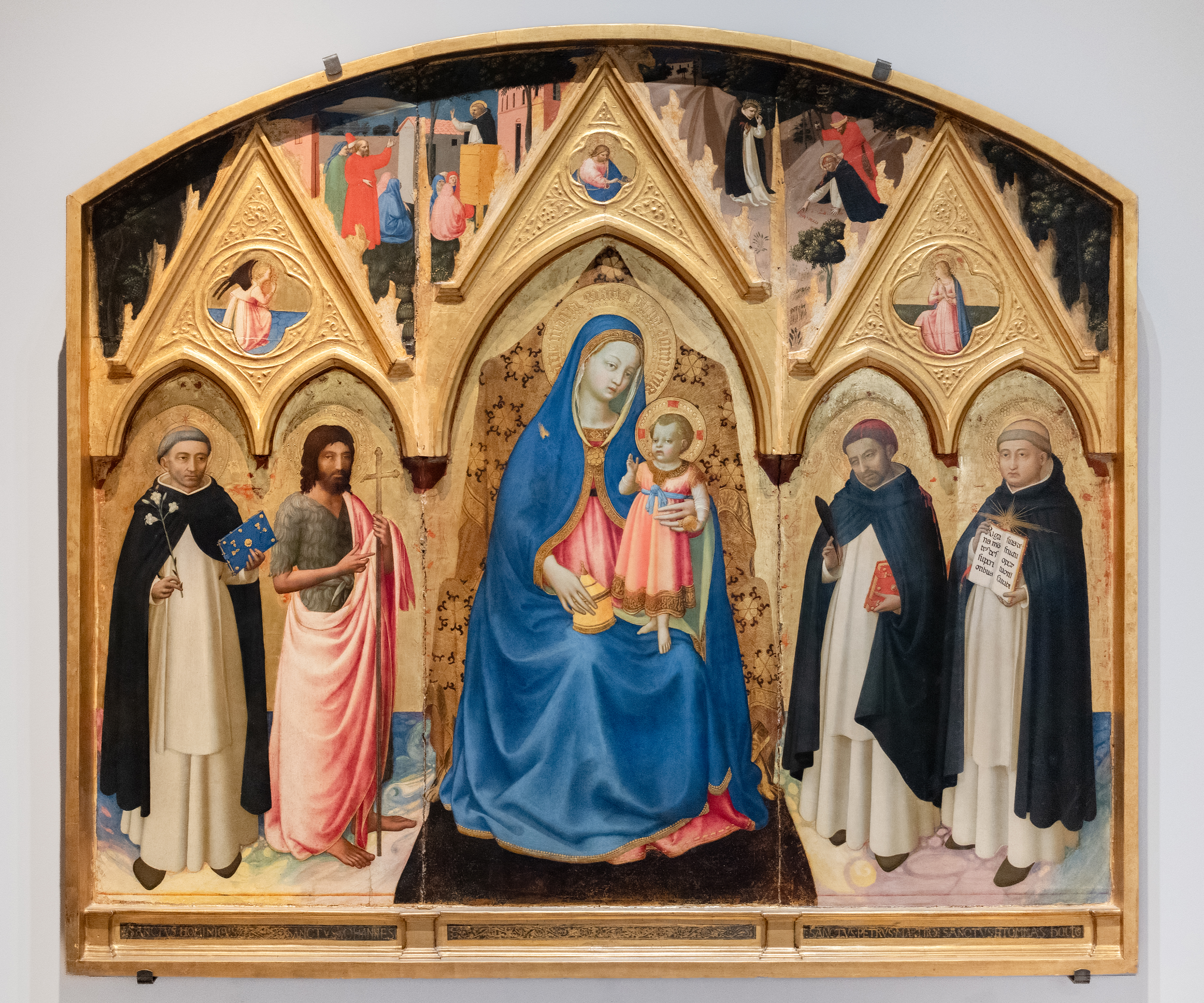
- Artist: Fra Angelico
- Year: 1428–1429
- Medium: Tempera on panel
- Dimensions: 137 cm × 168 cm (54 in × 66 in)
- Location: Museo di San Marco, Florence

The St. Peter of Verona Triptych (Italian: Trittico di San Pietro Martire) is a tempera-on-panel painting by the Italian early Renaissance master Fra Angelico, executed around 1428–1429. It is housed in the National Museum of San Marco in Florence, Italy.

== History ==
The work is Fra Angelico's first documented work. It comes from the convent of San Pietro Martire and a document from 30 March 1429 notes a sum of 20 florins owed to the convent of San Domenico, Fiesole, where the painter was a monk.

According to some art historians, it could be contemporary of the Virgin and Child with Saint Anne (1424–1425) by Masaccio and Masolino da Panicale, although it lacks the use of compartments which at the time were widespread.

== Description ==
In the center of the work is a Maestà (Madonna Enthroned with Child) and, at the sides, are the Saints Dominic, John the Baptist, Peter of Verona, and Thomas Aquinas. In the cusps are lobed tondos with the Annunciation Angel, the Annunciation and, in the center, Blessing Christ. Between the cusps are scenes of the life of St. Peter of Verona (Predication and Martyrdom).

The Madonna sits on a brocaded seat, with the Child standing on her knees. She is holding an ampulla, a reference to Mary Magdalene's ampulla and thus to Jesus' passion. The Child wears a tunic with rich golden decoration. His hand holds a globe, a symbol of his power, while the other hands is raised in a blessing gesture. The relative lack of decoration, compared to Angelico's earlier Fiesole Altarpiece (1424–1425), which was still heavily based on Gentile da Fabriano's style, show the growing influence of Masaccio and a more realistic approach.

== Sources ==
- Pope-Hennessy, John (1981). Beato Angelico. Florence: Scala.
- Cornini, Guido (2000). Beato Angelico. Florence: Giunti. ISBN 88-09-01602-5.
- Laurence B. Kanter, Pia Palladino (2005). Fra Angelico. New York: Metropolitan Museum of Art. p. 88. ISBN 978-0300111408.
