= Benedetto da Fiesole =

Italian painter (died 1448)

Fra Benedetto da Fiesole (died 1448), also known as Benedetto da Mugello, was an Italian artist.

== Life ==
Benedetto was born at the village of Vicchio, in the Florentine province of Mugello. he was a – probably younger – brother of the celebrated Fra Angelico, and with him entered the Convent of San Domenico at Fiesole in 1407, taking the name of Frater Benedictus, by which he is usually known. For three years previous to his death, which occurred in 1448, he held the post of superior of that convent. Fra Benedetto was a miniaturist of talent. He illuminated the choral books of San Marco, Florence, and also books in the convent of San Domenico, Fiesole. He is supposed also to have assisted Fra Angelico in his frescoes in San Marco.
