= Fra Angelico =

Italian friar and painter (c. 1395 – 1455)

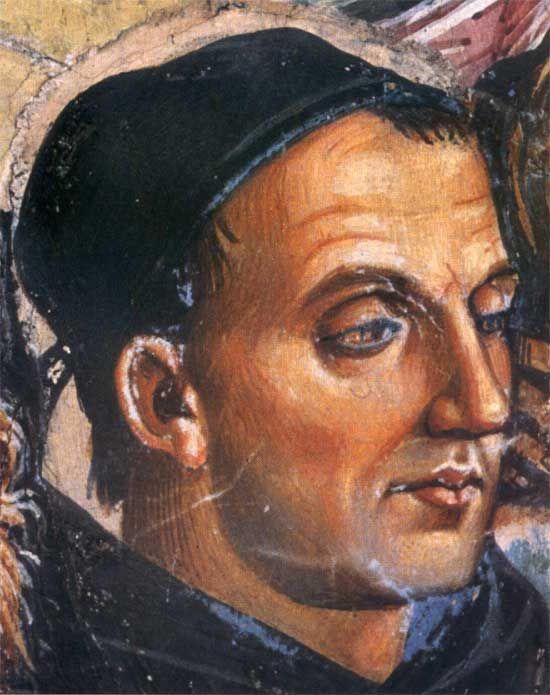
- Posthumous portrait from The Preaching of the Antichrist by Luca Signorelli (c. 1501) in Orvieto Cathedral, Italy
- Born: Guido di Pietro c. 1395; Vicchio, Republic of Florence
- Died: 18 February 1455 (aged about 60); Rome, Papal States
- Resting place: Church of Santa Maria sopra Minerva, Rome
- Known for: Painting; frescoes
- Notable work: Annunciation of Cortona; Fiesole Altarpiece; San Marco Altarpiece; Deposition of Christ; Niccoline Chapel
- Movement: Early Renaissance
- Relatives: Benedetto da Fiesole (brother)
- Patrons: Cosimo de' Medici; Pope Eugene IV; Pope Nicholas V

Blessed John of Fiesole O.P.
- Venerated in: Catholic Church (Dominican Order)
- Beatified: 3 October 1982, Vatican City, by Pope John Paul II
- Major shrine: Santa Maria sopra Minerva, Rome
- Feast: 18 February
- Patronage: Catholic artists

John of Fiesole (born Guido di Pietro; c. 1395 – 18 February 1455), known posthumously as Fra Angelico (/ˌfrɑː ænˈdʒɛlɪkoʊ/ FRAH an-JEL-ik-oh, Italian: [ˈfra anˈdʒɛːliko]; "Angelic Friar/Brother") or in Italian as Beato Angelico ("Blessed Angelic One"), was an Italian Dominican friar and painter active during the early Florentine Renaissance.

Angelico created a series of frescoes for the Dominican convent of San Marco in Florence, where he received the patronage of Cosimo de' Medici. His works include the San Marco Altarpiece and the Deposition of Christ, both made for the convent of San Marco. Painting exclusively religious subjects throughout his career, Angelico completed commissions in Rome under the patronage of Popes Eugene IV and Nicholas V. Angelico was a pioneer of the artistic trends that came to distinguish the early Renaissance, namely linear perspective and a greater attention to depth and form than had been practised in the late Medieval period.

Angelico was beatified by Pope John Paul II in 1982. In 1984, John Paul declared him the patron of artists, especially painters.

== Biography ==
He was known to his contemporaries as Fra Giovanni da Fiesole ('Friar John of Fiesole'), reflecting the town where he joined the Dominican Order, and Fra Giovanni Angelico ('Angelic Brother John'). In modern Italian, he is referred to as Beato Angelico ('Blessed Angelic One') following his beatification by Pope John Paul II.

=== Early life, 1395–1436 ===
Fra Angelico was born around 1395 in the Tuscan region of Mugello, specifically in the town of Vicchio near Fiesole. He was baptised Guido di Pietro and had a younger brother named Benedetto. The earliest known record of him is dated 17 October 1417, when he attended a religious confraternity or guild at the Church of Our Lady of Mount Carmel under the name Guido di Pietro. Payments made to Guido di Pietro in January and February 1418 for work at the church of Santo Stefano del Ponte in Florence indicate that he was already working as a painter.

By 1423, Angelico had joined the convent of San Domenico in Fiesole. Following the custom of adopting a new name upon entering a religious order, he adopted the name Fra Giovanni (Friar John). As a Dominican, he relied on alms and donations for his livelihood. Angelico initially trained as a manuscript illuminator and may have collaborated with his brother Benedetto, who also joined the Dominican Order. Some illuminated manuscripts have been attributed to him or his workshop, though these attributions remain debated. He may have been influenced by Lorenzo Monaco, though direct training is not documented, and influences from the Sienese school are evident in his work. Angelico trained with Master Varricho in Milan. According to Giorgio Vasari, Angelico's first major work was an altarpiece and a painted screen for the Charterhouse (Carthusian monastery) of Florence, though nothing remains of these today.

From 1408 to 1418, Angelico painted frescoes, many of which have now been lost, at the Dominican friary of Cortona as an assistant to Gherardo Starnina or one of his followers. By 1418, he had returned to Fiesole, where he painted a number of works for the monastery, including the Fiesole Altarpiece. A predella of the altarpiece depicting Christ in Glory alongside over 250 figures, including beatified Dominicans, is conserved in the National Gallery. Around 1427, Angelico produced an altarpiece depicting the Coronation of the Virgin, which remained at San Domenico until 1812 when artist and collector Vivant Denon acquired it for the Louvre. Angelico also produced a Madonna of Humility now kept in the Thyssen-Bornemisza Museum. Also completed at this time were an Annunciation and a Madonna of the Pomegranate, both of which are now in the Prado Museum.

=== San Marco, Florence, 1436–1445 ===
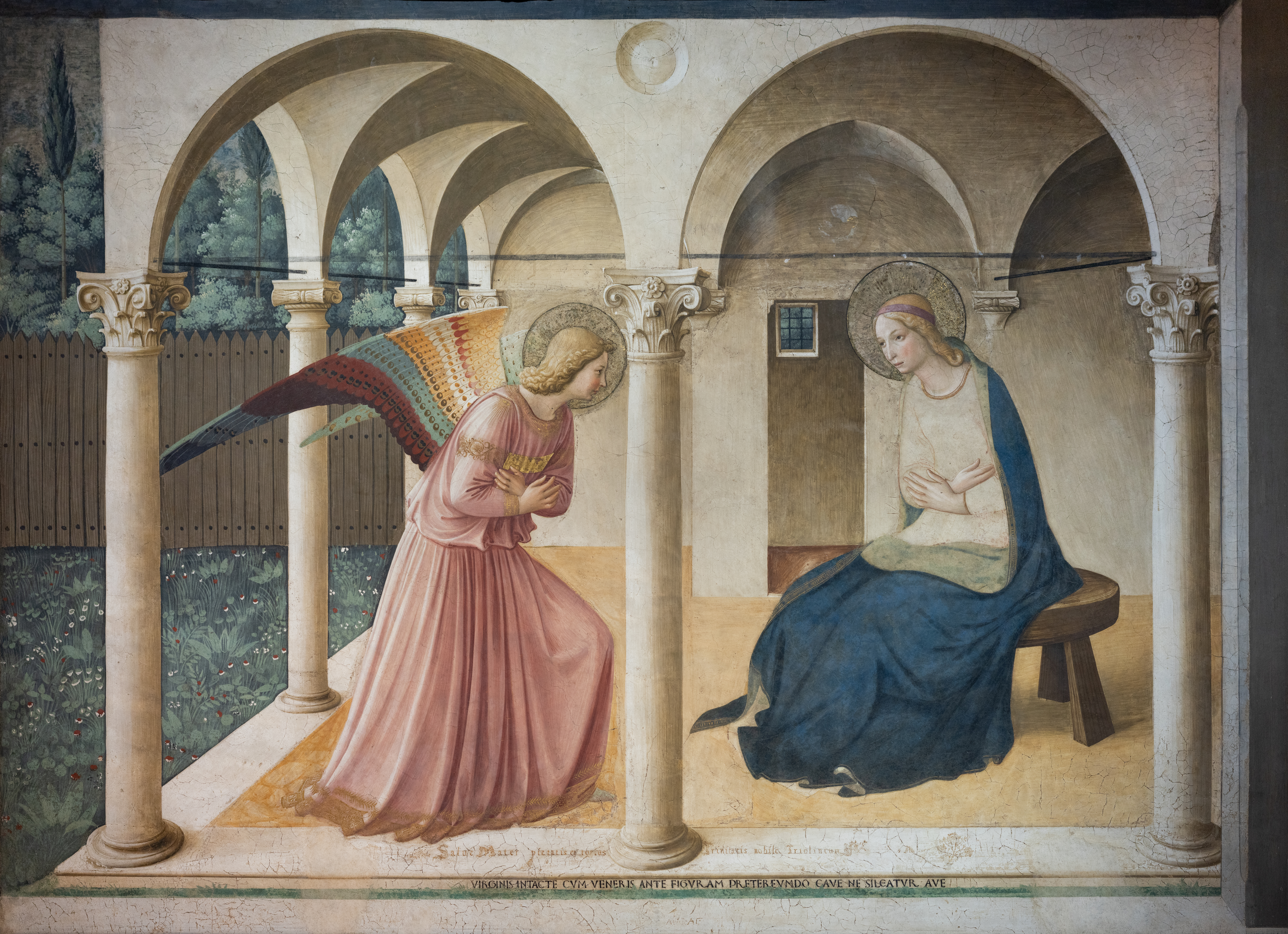
Annunciation, c. 1440–1445

In 1436, Angelico was one of a number of friars from Fiesole who moved to the newly built convent of San Marco in Florence. This move placed him at the heart of the artistic life of the region. During these years in Florence, he was certainly in contact with the three artistic circles in the city in the early 15th century: the school of miniaturists, the workshops of the last Giottesque students (followers of Giotto), and a group of young sculptors and architects destined for great fame: Jacopo della Quercia, Lorenzo Ghiberti, Filippo Brunelleschi and Donatello.

Angelico soon attracted the patronage of Cosimo de' Medici, one of the wealthiest and most powerful members of the city's governing authority, the Signoria, and the founder of the Medici Dynasty that was to dominate Florentine politics for much of the Renaissance. Cosimo had a cell reserved for himself at the convent as a retreat from the world. Vasari reports that Cosimo commissioned Angelico to decorate the convent with frescoes, which were greatly admired at the time. They include the magnificent fresco of the chapter house, the much-reproduced Annunciation at the top of the stairs leading to the cells, the Maestà (or Coronation of the Madonna) with Saints (cell 9), and many other smaller devotional frescoes in the cells depicting stories of the Nativity and Passion of Jesus.

In his early works, Angelico retained a Gothic style. In the small tabernacles of San Marco, however, the simplicity of his compositions and colours shows traces of the mature style that was to characterize his works. In his Deposition of Christ, produced for the Strozzi Chapel in Santa Trinita, he reached the full expression of this style. In this painting, the naturalistic spirit of the 15th century is affirmed by the lifelike figures, who possess a variety of expressions and gestures, as well as in the representation of a naturalistic landscape, which replaced the traditional gold ground typical of the Gothic period.

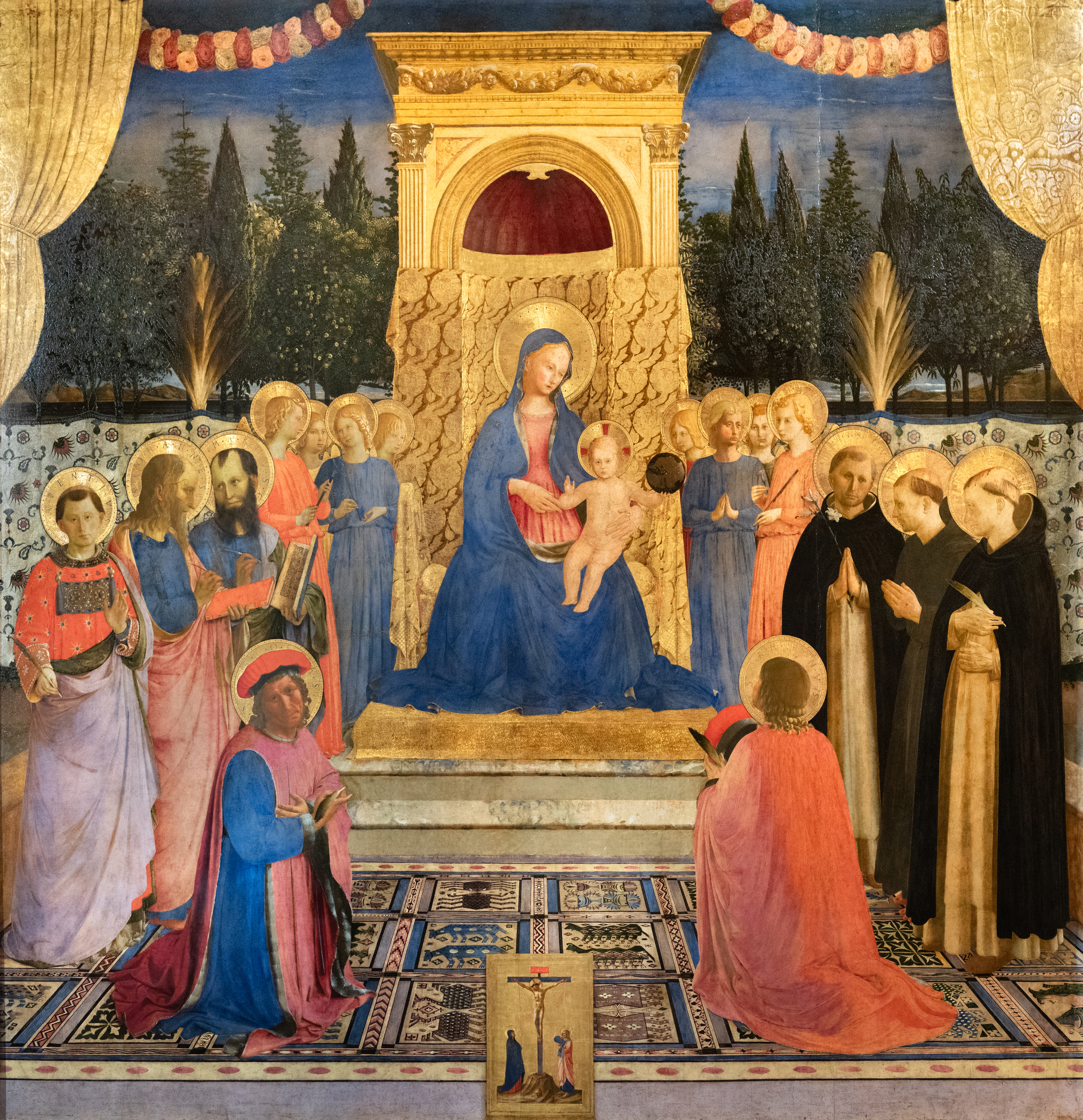
San Marco Altarpiece

In 1439, Angelico completed one of his most famous and influential works: the San Marco Altarpiece. It created a new religious genre, sacra conversazione (sacred conversation), later used by artists including Giovanni Bellini, Titian, Perugino and Raphael. Although representations of the enthroned Madonna and Child surrounded by saints were common, they were depicted in a heaven-like setting, hovering as spiritual presences rather than with earthly substance. In the San Marco Altarpiece, the saints stand squarely within the space, grouped in a natural way as if conversing about their shared witness of the Virgin Mary.

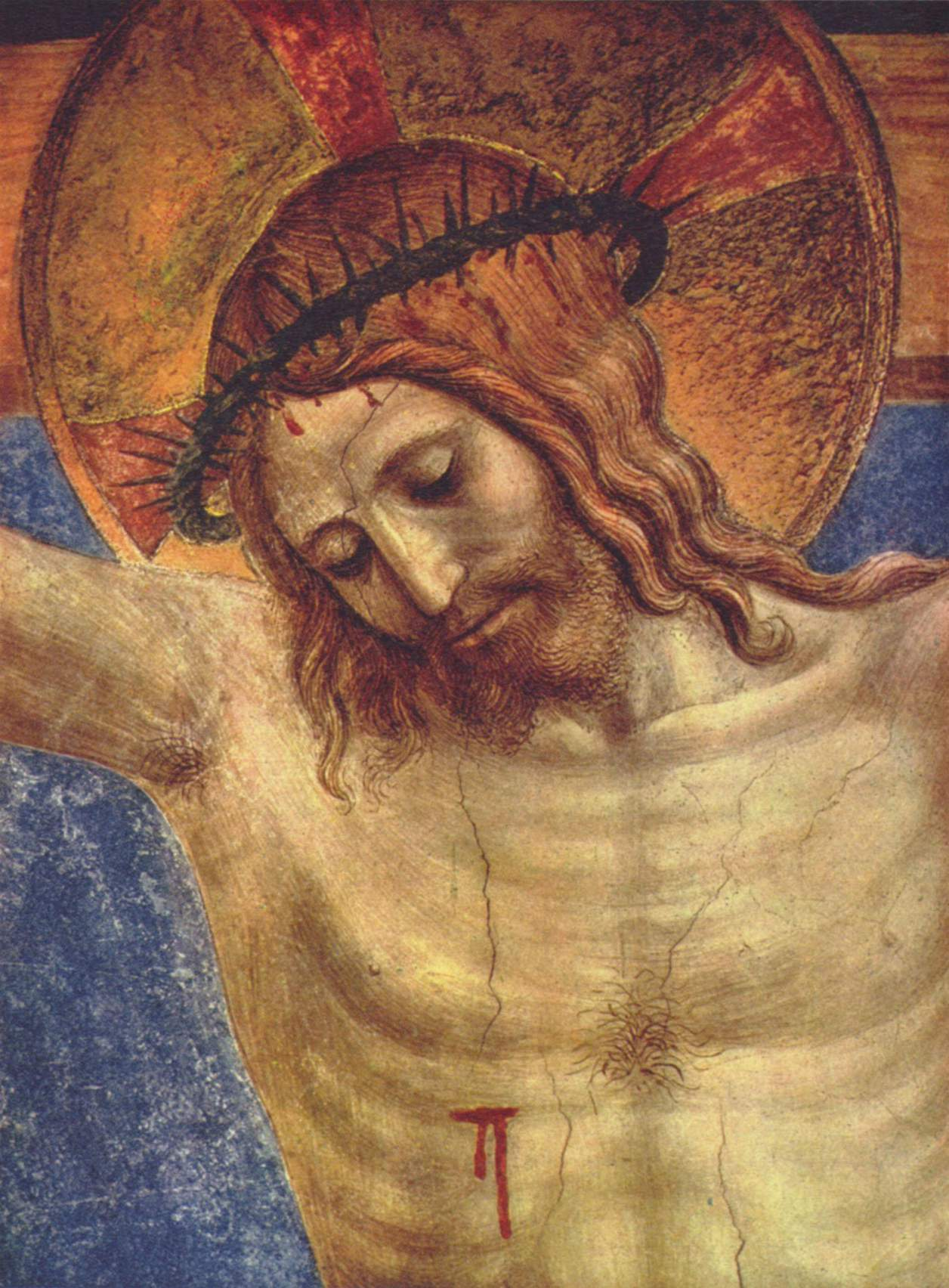
The Crucified Christ (detail)

=== The Vatican, 1445–1455 ===
In 1445, Pope Eugene IV summoned Angelico to Rome to paint the frescoes of the Chapel of the Holy Sacrament at St Peter's, later demolished by Pope Paul III. Vasari suggests that at this time Angelico was offered the Archbishopric of Florence by Pope Nicholas V, which he rejected, recommending another friar in his place. However, the story does not align with the historical facts. In 1445 the Pope was Eugene IV and Nicholas was not to be elected until two years later in March 1447. The archbishop in question during 1446–1459 was the Dominican Antoninus of Florence (Antonio Pierozzi), who was canonized by Pope Adrian VI in 1523.

In 1447, Angelico and his pupil, Benozzo Gozzoli, travelled to Orvieto to produce works for the Cathedral of the Assumption of Mary. Among his other pupils was Zanobi Strozzi.

From 1447 to 1449, Angelico was again at the Vatican, designing the frescoes for the Niccoline Chapel for Nicholas V. The scenes from the lives of the two martyred deacons of the Early Christian Church, St. Stephen and St. Lawrence may have been executed wholly or in part by assistants. The small chapel, with its brightly frescoed walls and gold leaf decorations, gives the impression of a jewel box. From 1449 until 1452, Angelico returned to the convent in Fiesole, where he became Prior.

=== Death and beatification ===
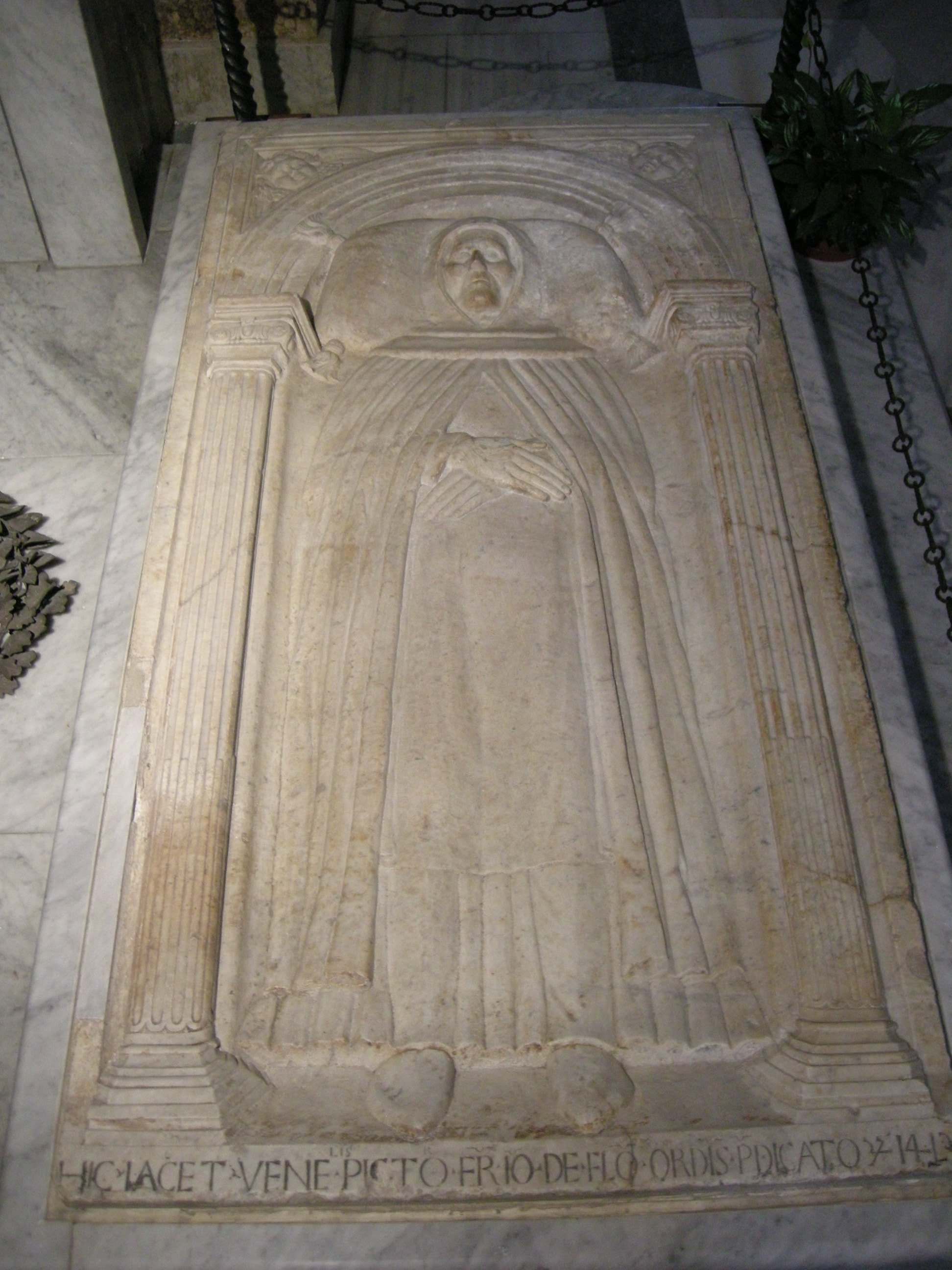
Fra Angelico's tomb in Santa Maria sopra Minerva, Rome

Fra Angelico died in 1455 while staying at a Dominican convent in Rome, possibly on an order to work on Pope Nicholas' chapel. He was buried in the church of Santa Maria sopra Minerva, in Rome. Angelico was interred in a niche near the altar in a marble tomb. The tombstone is an effigy carved in relief depicting Angelico in a Dominican habit. Above the tomb are two epitaphs, probably by Lorenzo Valla. The first reads:

Give me not praise for being another Apelles,
But say, rather, that in the name of Christ, that I gave all I had to the poor.
The deeds that count on Earth are not the ones that count in Heaven.
That city which is the flower of Etruria bore me, Giovanni.

Below this is inscribed:

In this place is enshrined the glory, the mirror, and the ornament of painters, John the Florentine. A religious and a true servant of God, he was a brother of the holy Order of Saint Dominic. His disciples mourn the death of such a great master, for who will find another brush like his? His homeland and his order mourn the death of a distinguished painter, who had no equal in his art.

The English writer and critic William Michael Rossetti wrote of the friar:

From various accounts of Fra Angelico's life, it is possible to gain some sense of why he was deserving of canonization. He led the devout and ascetic life of a Dominican friar, and never rose above that rank; he followed the dictates of the order in caring for the poor; he was always good-humored. All of his many paintings were of divine subjects, and it seems that he never altered or retouched them, perhaps from a religious conviction that, because his paintings were divinely inspired, they should retain their original form. He was wont to say that he who illustrates the acts of Christ should be with Christ. It is averred that he never handled a brush without fervent prayer and he wept when he painted a Crucifixion. The Last Judgment and the Annunciation were two of the subjects he most frequently treated.

Pope John Paul II beatified Angelico on 3 October 1982 and in 1984 declared him patron of Catholic artists. John Paul II noted that:

Angelico was reported to say "He who does Christ's work must stay with Christ always". This motto earned him the epithet "Blessed Angelico", because of the perfect integrity of his life and the almost divine beauty of the images he painted, to a superlative extent those of the Blessed Virgin Mary.

He is commemorated by the current Roman Martyrology on 18 February, the date of his death in 1455. There the Latin text reads Beatus Ioannes Faesulanus, cognomento Angelicus ("Blessed John of Fiesole, known as the Angelic").

== Evaluation ==
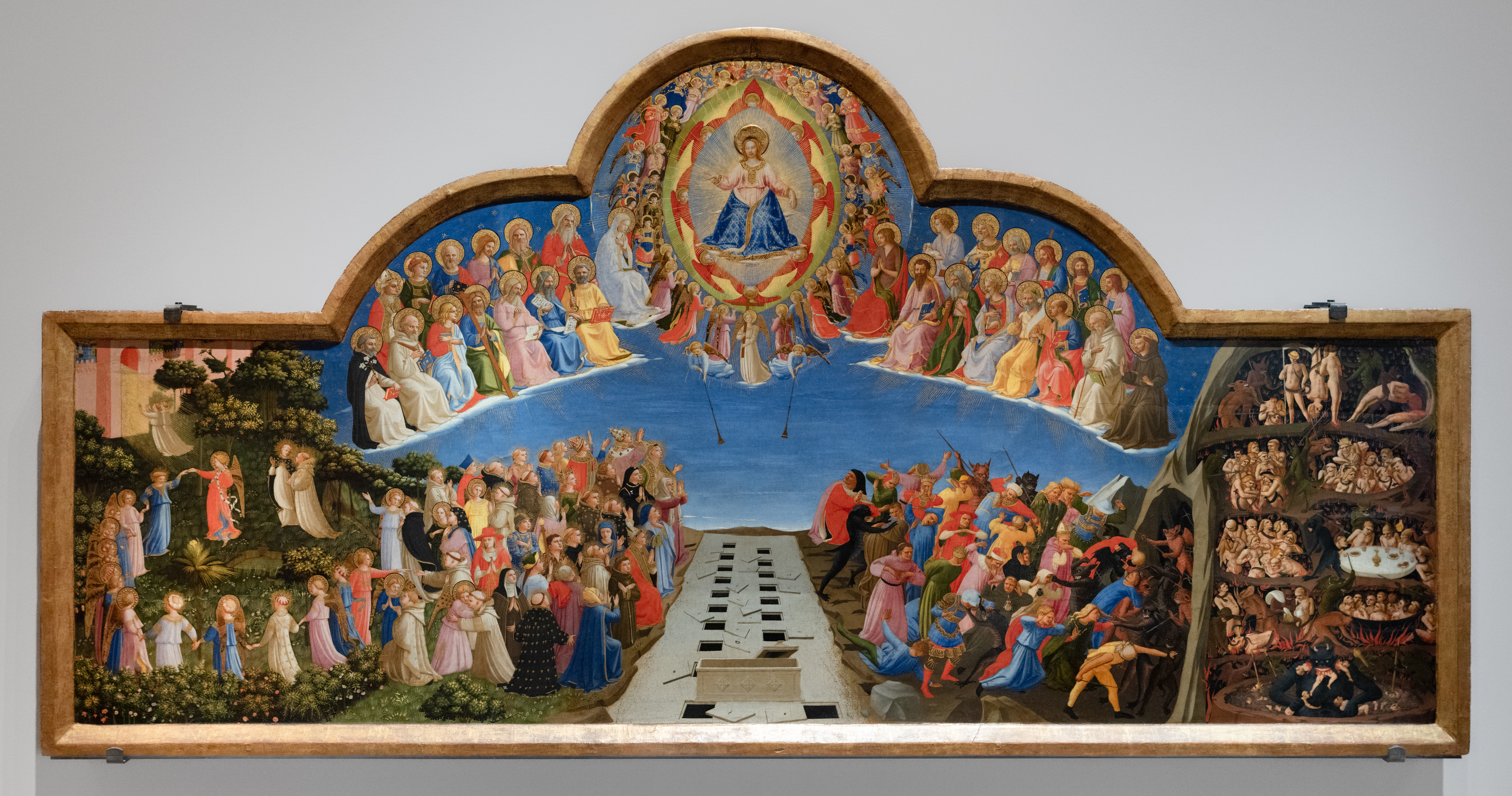
The Day of Judgement, upper panel of an altarpiece in the convent of San Marco, Florence. (1425–1430)

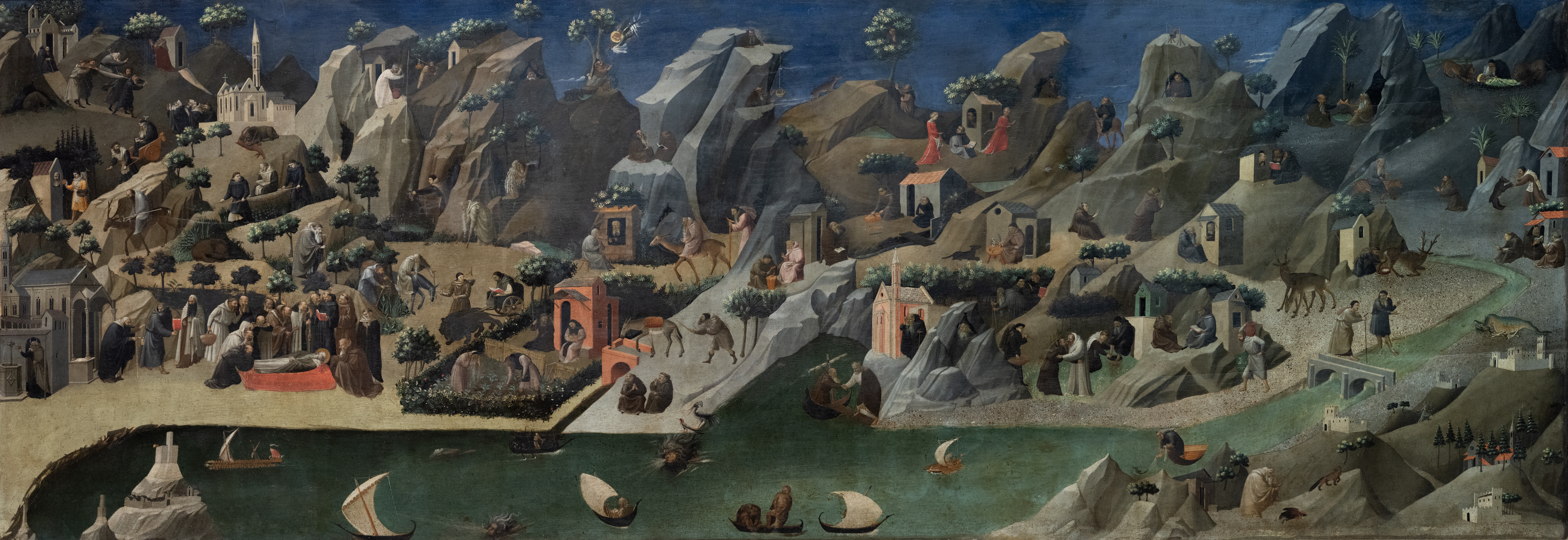
A Thebaide, showing the activities in the lives of the saints, 1420

=== Background ===
Angelico worked during a period of significant change in European artistic style, marked by the transition from the Medieval tradition to the Early Renaissance. This shift began in the fourteenth century with artists such as Giotto and Giusto de' Menabuoi. Both Angelico and de' Menabuoi produced major works in Padua, while Giotto had earlier trained in Florence under the Gothic painter Cimabue.

Giotto's fresco cycle depicting the life of Saint Francis at the Basilica of Santa Croce represented a departure from earlier conventions through its emphasis on naturalism, spatial coherence, and emotional expression. His approach influenced a number of later painters who adopted and expanded upon his techniques, such as the brothers Pietro and Ambrogio Lorenzetti and their developments towards narrative clarity and realism.

The Adoration of the Magi is a tondo depicting the arrival of the Magi during the Nativity of Christ. It is credited to Fra Angelico and Filippo Lippi and dates to c. 1440/1460.

=== Altarpieces ===
The works of Angelico combine elements of the late Gothic tradition with emerging Renaissance principles. In his Coronation of the Virgin, an altarpiece painted for the Florentine church of Santa Maria Novella, Angelico employed features typical of prestigious fourteenth-century altarpieces, including a finely worked gold ground and extensive use of azurite and vermilion pigments. The gilded haloes and gold-edged garments reflect the refined decorative conventions of Gothic painting.

The work also demonstrates characteristics associated with the Renaissance. In contrast to earlier Gothic examples, such as altarpieces by Gentile da Fabriano, Angelico's figures are rendered with greater solidity, three-dimensional form, and naturalism. The drapery of the garments follows the structure of the bodies beneath, and the figures convey a sense of physical weight, despite being depicted standing on clouds rather than on solid ground.

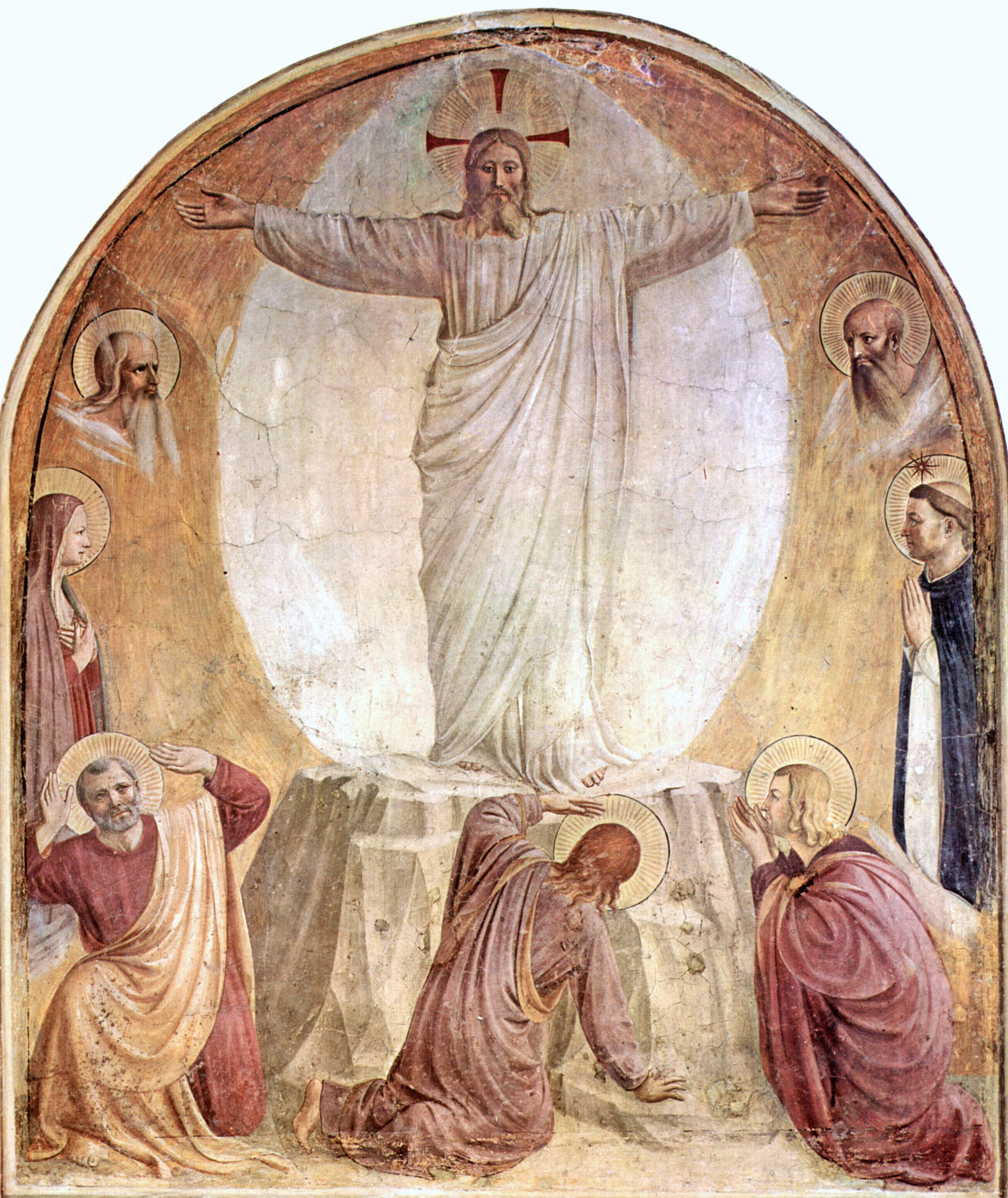
The Transfiguration shows the directness, simplicity and restrained palette typical of these frescoes. Located in a monk's cell at the Convent San' Marco, its apparent purpose is to encourage private devotion.

=== Frescoes ===
Angelico produced a series of frescoes for the cells of San Marco that built upon Masaccio's work. The dormitory of San Marco consists of three corridors with thirty-eight internal cells, each decorated by Angelico with frescoes depicting scenes from the life of Jesus in a loose narrative sequence.

The fresoes are the same shape as the arched window and vaulted ceiling of each cell. The decoration and style reflects the Dominican Rule's focus on charity, and the cells contain no other decorations to distract from the fresco scenes. Vasari explains that Angelico was inspired to create a large crucifixion scene with many saints for the chapter house after Cosimo de' Medici saw the frescoes. As with the other frescoes, de' Medici's patronage did not influence Angelico's artistic expression with displays of wealth.

Masaccio ventured into perspective with his creation of a realistically painted niche at Santa Maria Novella. Subsequently, Angelico demonstrated an understanding of linear perspective, particularly in his annunciation paintings set inside the sort of arcades that Michelozzo and Brunelleschi created at San Marco and the square in front of it.

=== Lives of the Saints ===
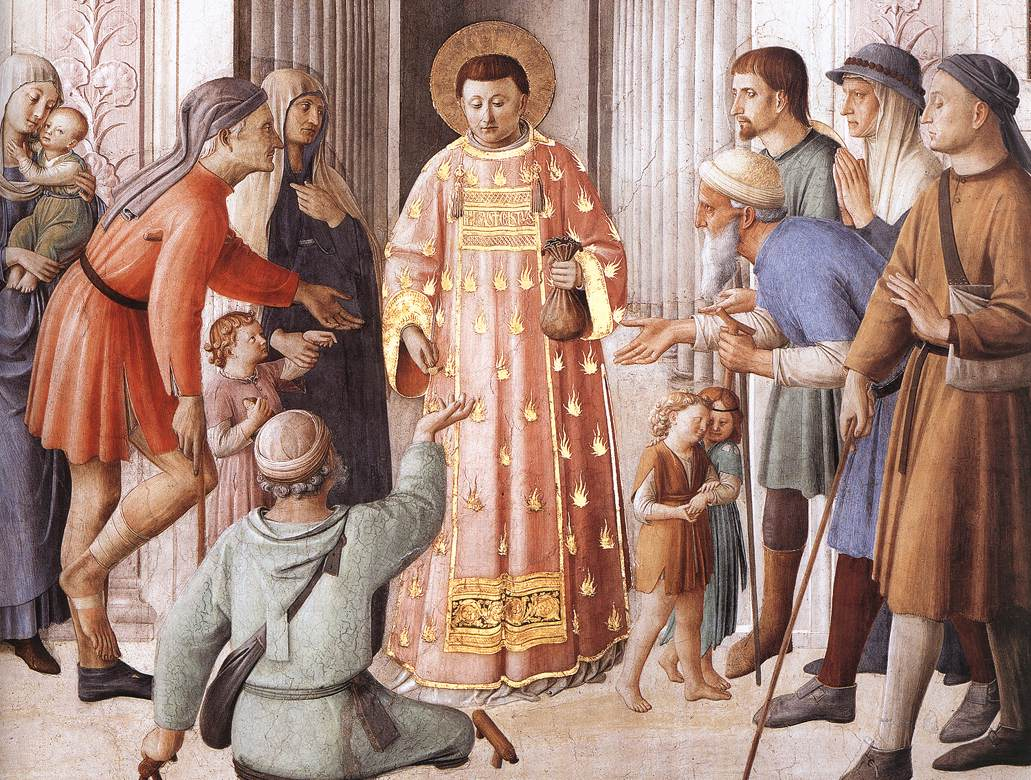
Saint Lawrence distributing alms 1447–1450, fresco, Chapel of Nicholas V, Vatican City. This painting incorporates the expensive pigments, gold leaf and elaborate design typical of Vatican commissions.

When Fra Angelico went to the Vatican to decorate the chapel of Pope Nicholas, he was again confronted with the need to please the very wealthiest of clients. The walls are decked with the brilliance of colour and gold that are found in the most lavish creations of the Gothic painter Simone Martini at the Lower Church of St Francis of Assisi, a hundred years earlier. Yet Angelico created designs that reveal his own preoccupation with humanity, humility, and piety. According to Vasari, "in their bearing and expression, the saints painted by Angelico come nearer to the truth than the figures done by any other artist."

It is probable that much of the actual painting was done by his assistants to his design. Benozzo Gozzoli was a highly accomplished painter but took his art further towards the fully developed Renaissance style with his expressive and lifelike portraits in his masterpiece depicting the Journey of the Magi, painted in the Medici's private chapel at their palazzo.

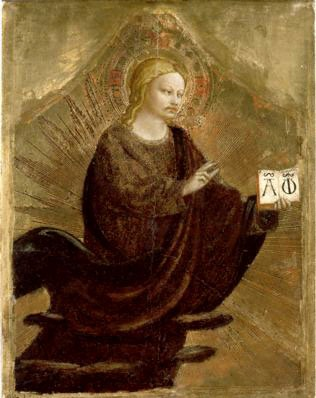
Blessing Redeemer (1423)

=== Artistic legacy ===
Through Fra Angelico's pupil Benozzo Gozzoli's portraiture and technical style in the art of fresco we see a link to Domenico Ghirlandaio, who was commissioned by the wealthy patrons of Florence, and through Ghirlandaio to his pupil Michelangelo and the High Renaissance.

When Michelangelo took up the Sistine Chapel commission, he was working within a space that had already been extensively decorated by other artists. Around the walls the Life of Christ and Life of Moses were depicted by a range of artists including his teacher Ghirlandaio, Raphael's teacher Perugino and Botticelli.

Within the cells of San Marco, Fra Angelico had demonstrated that painterly skill and the artist's personal interpretation were sufficient to create memorable works of art, without the expensive trappings of blue and gold. In the use of the unadorned fresco technique, the clear, bright colours, the careful arrangement of a few significant figures and the skillful use of expression, motion and gesture, Michelangelo showed himself to be the artistic descendant of Fra Angelico. Frederick Hartt describes Fra Angelico as "prophetic of the mysticism" of painters such as Rembrandt, El Greco and Zurbarán.

Vasari praised Fra Angelico: "it is impossible to bestow too much praise on this holy father, who was so humble and modest in all that he did and said and whose pictures were painted with such facility and piety."

== Works ==
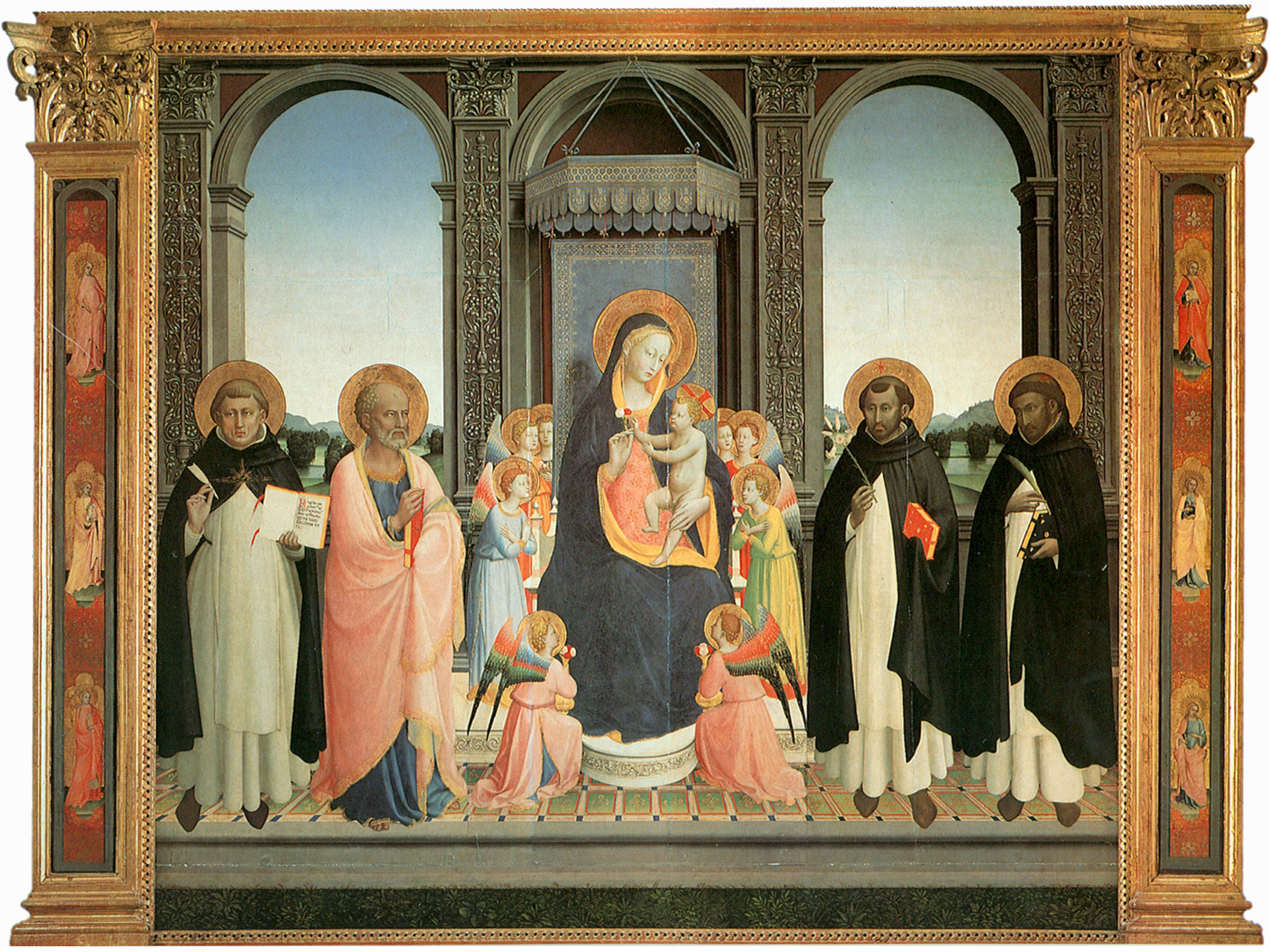
Virgin and Child with Saints, detail, Fiesole (1428–1430)

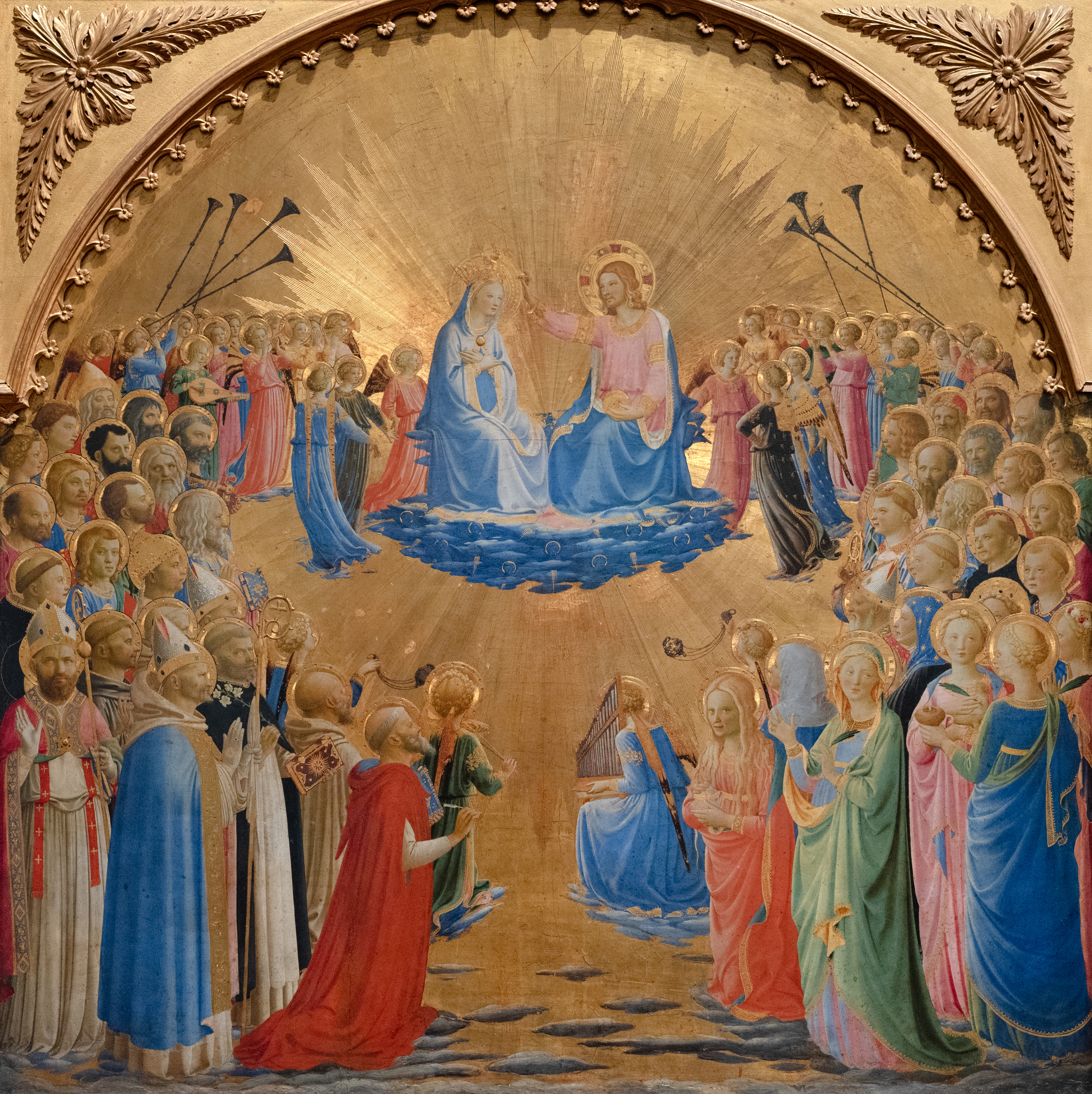
Coronation of the Virgin (c. 1432)

=== Early works, 1408–1436 ===
Unknown

- Saint James and Saint Lucy Predella, five panels, tempera, c. 1426 to 1428

Rome

- The Crucifixion, panel, c. 1420–1423, Metropolitan Museum, New York. Possibly Fra Angelico's only signed work.

Oxford, England

- The Crucifixion with the Virgin, Saint John the Evangelist and the Magdalen. early 1420s. Ashmolean Museum, Oxford. Purchased from a private collection in November 2024.

Cortona

- Annunciation, c. 1430, Diocesan Museum, Cortona

Fiesole

- Coronation of the Virgin, altarpiece with predellas of Miracles of St Dominic, Church of San Domenico, Louvre, Paris
- Virgin and Child between Saints Thomas Aquinas, Barnabas, Dominic and Peter Martyr, altarpiece, San Domenico, 1424
- Christ in Majesty, predella, National Gallery, London.

Florence: Basilica di San Marco

- Dormition of the Virgin, 1431

Florence: Santa Trinita

- Deposition of Christ, altarpiece, National Museum of San Marco, Florence.
- Coronation of the Virgin, c. 1432, Uffizi, Florence
- Coronation of the Virgin, c. 1434–1435, Louvre, Paris

Florence: Santa Maria degli Angeli

- Last Judgement, Accademia, Florence

Florence: Santa Maria Novella

- Coronation of the Virgin, altarpiece, Uffizi.

=== San Marco, Florence, 1436–1445 ===
- Altarpiece for chancel – Virgin with Saints Cosmas and Damian, attended by Saints Dominic, Peter, Francis, Mark, John Evangelist and Stephen. Cosmas and Damian were patrons of the Medici. The altarpiece was commissioned in 1438 by Cosimo de' Medici. It was removed and disassembled during the renovation of the convent church in the seventeenth century. Two of the nine predella panels remain at the convent; seven are in Washington, Munich, Dublin and Paris. Two missing side panels depicting Dominican saints were found in the 2000s.

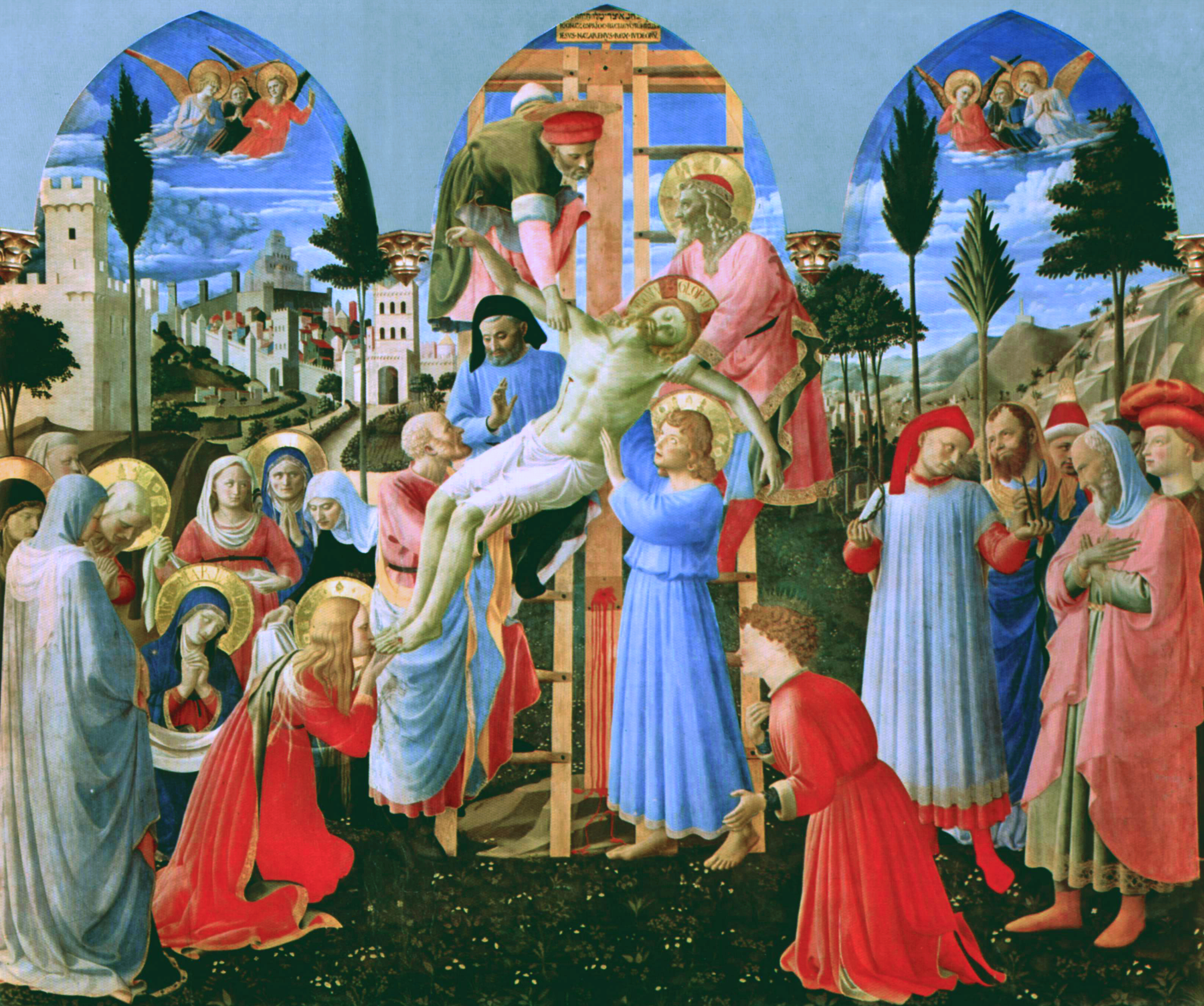
The Deposition from the Cross, Museo San Marco

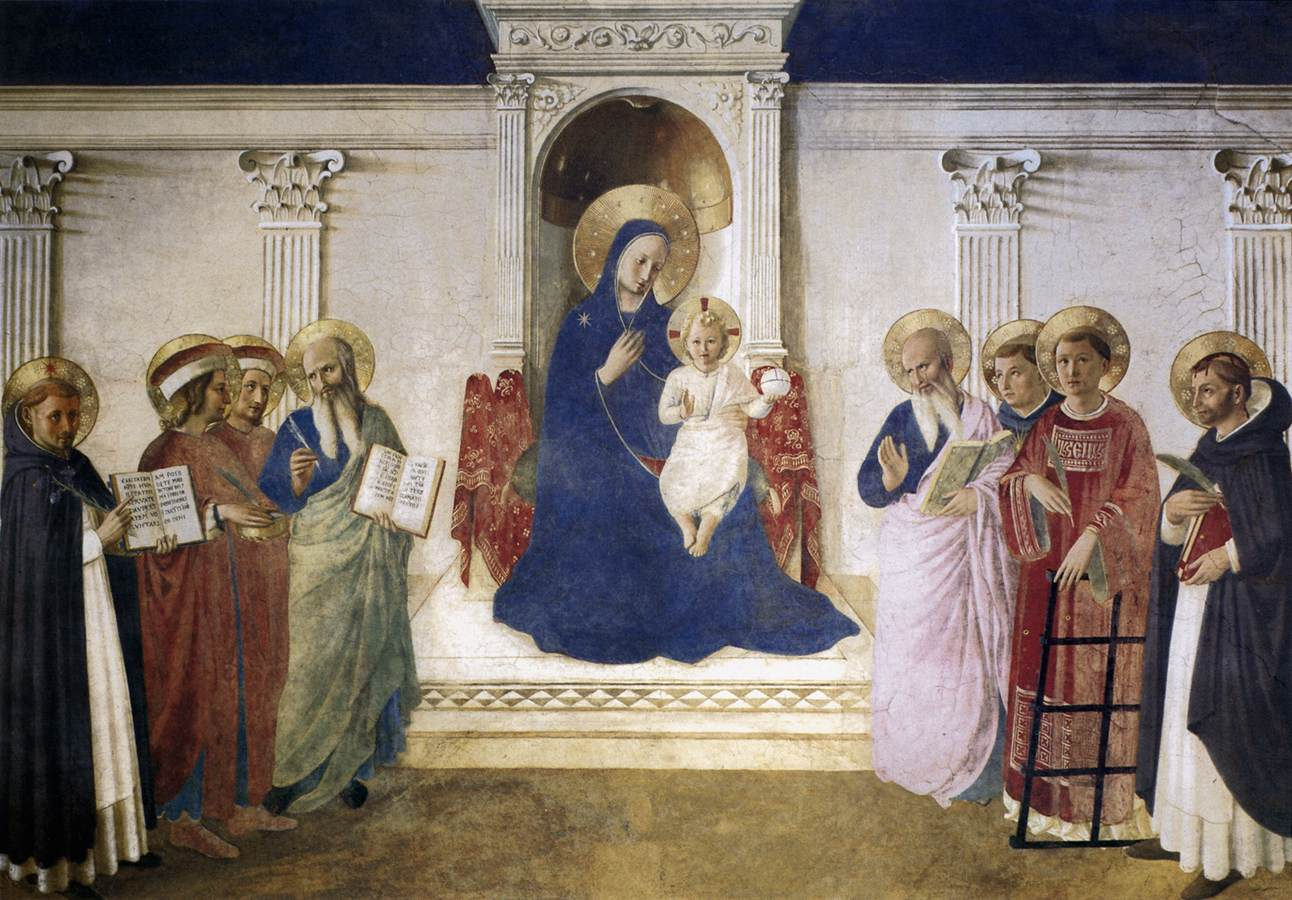
The Madonna enthroned with Saints Cosmas and Damian, Saint Mark and Saint John, Saint Lawrence and three Dominicans, Saint Dominic, Saint Thomas Aquinas and Saint Peter Martyr; San Marco, Florence

- Altarpiece? – Madonna and Child with Twelve Angels (life sized); Uffizi.
- Altarpiece – The Annunciation
- San Marco Altarpiece
- Two versions of the Crucifixion with St Dominic; in the Cloister
- Very large Crucifixion with Virgin and 20 Saints; in the Chapter House
- The Annunciation; at the top of the Dormitory stairs. This is probably the most reproduced of all Fra Angelico's paintings.
- Virgin Enthroned with Four Saints; in the Dormitory passage

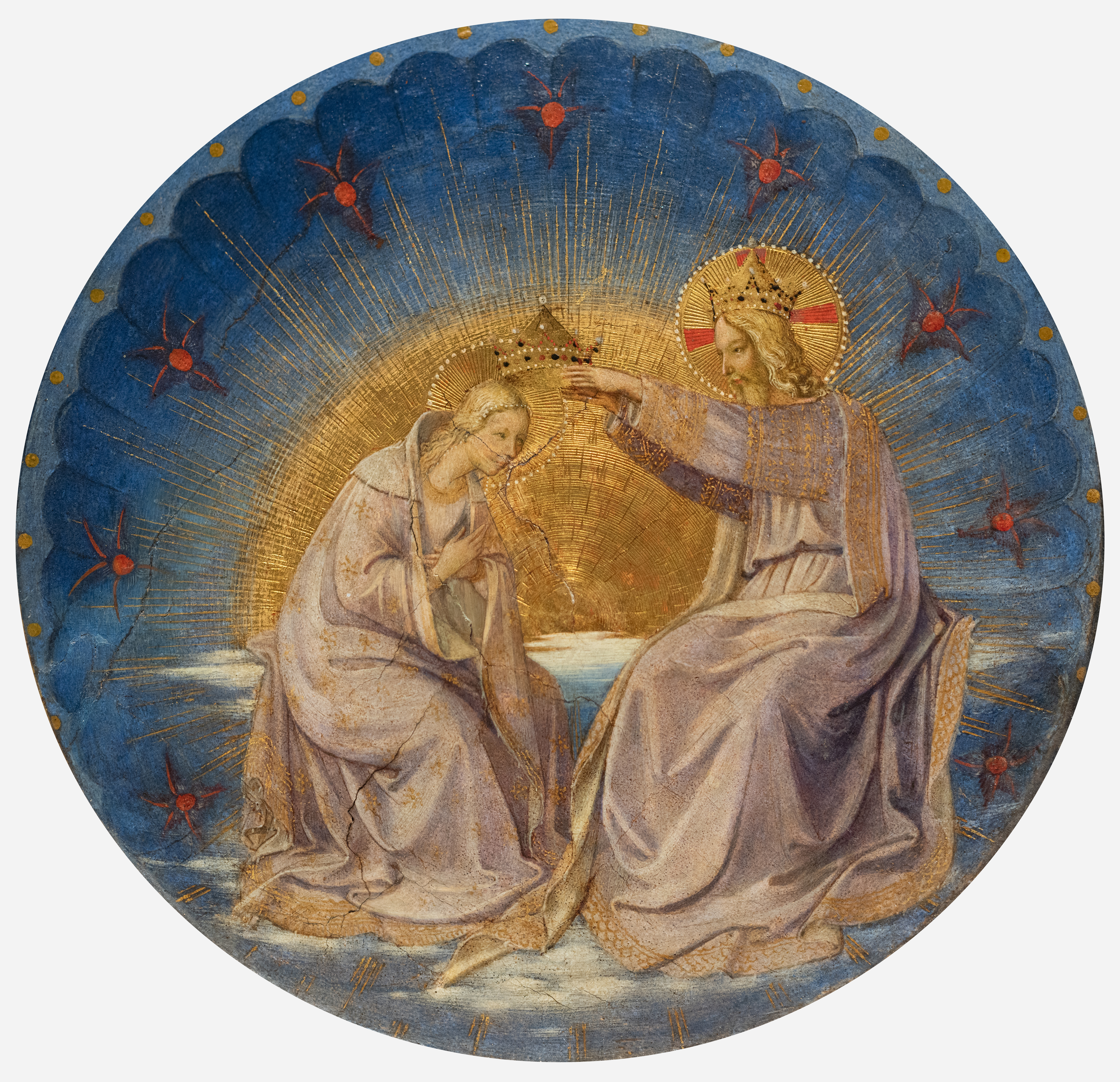
Coronation of the Virgin medallion, 1450s

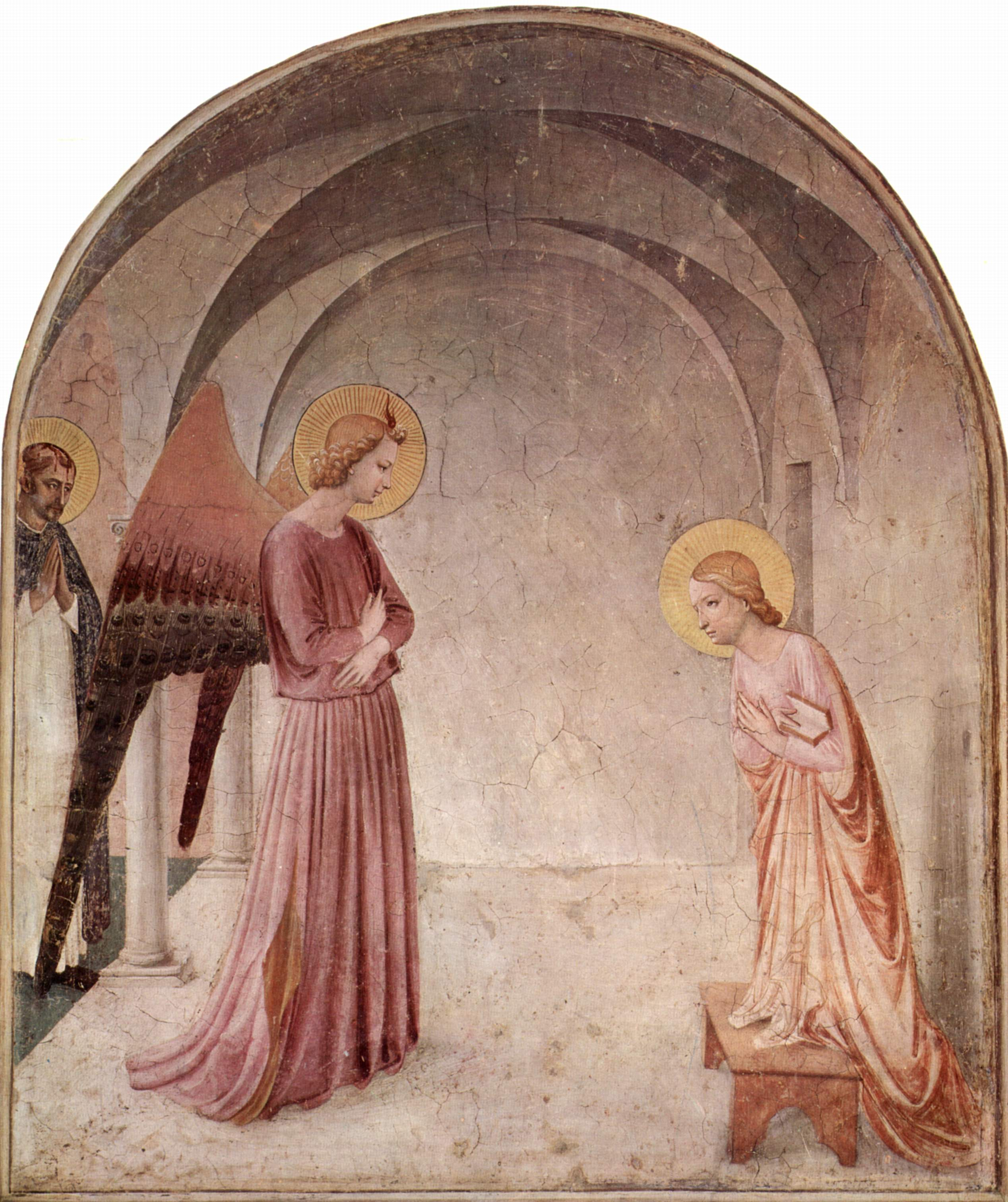
In The Annunciation, the interior reproduces that of the cell in which it is located.

Each cell is decorated with a fresco which matches in size and shape the single round-headed window beside it. The frescoes are apparently for contemplative purposes. Many of Fra Angelico's finest and most reproduced works are among them. There are, particularly in the inner row of cells, some of the less inspiring quality and of the more repetitive subject, perhaps completed by assistants. Many pictures include Dominican saints as witnesses of the scene each in one of the nine traditional prayer postures depicted in De Modo Orandi. The friar using the cell could place himself in the scene.

- The Adoration of the Magi
- The Transfiguration
- Noli me tangere
- The Three Marys at the Tomb.
- The Road to Emmaus, with two Dominicans as the disciples
- The Mocking of Christ
- There are many versions of the Crucifixion

=== Late works, 1445–1455 ===
Orvieto Cathedral

Three segments of the ceiling in the Cappella Nuova, with the assistance of Benozzo Gozzoli.

- Christ in Glory
- The Virgin Mary
- The Apostles

Niccoline Chapel

The Chapel of Pope Nicholas V, at the Vatican, was probably painted with much assistance from Benozzo Gozzoli and Gentile da Fabriano. The entire surface of the wall and ceiling is sumptuously painted. There is much gold leaf for borders and decoration, and a great use of brilliant blue made from lapis lazuli.

- The Life of St Stephen
- The Life of St Lawrence
- The Four Evangelists.

=== Discovery of lost works ===
The San Marco Altarpiece had eight side panels. During Napoleon's Italian campaigns, they were dispersed, with the whereabouts of two remaining unknown for centuries. Around 2005, those two were discovered in Oxford in the home of Jean Preston, a curator of medieval manuscripts at the Huntington Library and Princeton University Library. Preston and her amateur collector father, Kerrison Preston, had purchased them in California in 1965 for around $200–400, where they were described as "panel paintings of Dominican Saints, 15th Century, Italian". The panels had been inherited by an American widow after her husband had died in Switzerland c. 1924–1925. Michael Liversidge, a former dean of art history at the University of Bristol, evaluated the panels at Preston's house, describing them as a "once in a lifetime" find. After her death in 2006, the collection in her estate was auctioned off by Duke's, an auction house in Dorset. In April 2007, Florentine antiquarian Fabrizio Moretti anonymously outbid the Italian ministry of art and culture to purchase the two panels for £1.7 million. Later that year, the Polo Museale Fiorentino and the Cassa di Risparmio di Firenze each purchased one of them for a total of €3.6 million, subsequently entrusting them to San Marco Museum. In 2025, the altarpiece was temporarily displayed alongside 17 of the 18 total known predellas and panels at Palazzo Strozzi as part of the Beato Angelico exhibition.

== See also ==
- List of Italian painters
- List of famous Italians
- Early Renaissance painting
- Poor Man's Bible
- Fray Angelico Chavez – Franciscan friar, historian and artist who was named after Fra Angelico due to his interest in painting
- Western painting
