= Saint James and Saint Lucy Predella =

Series of paintings by Fra Angelico

Saint James and Saint Lucy Predella is a circa 1426 to 1428 series of five tempera on panel paintings by Fra Angelico. Together, and possibly with other unknown paintings, they formed the predella to a single altarpiece, now lost or not clearly identified. They are dated on the basis of stylistic motifs and they cannot be later than 1435, when Andrea di Giusto copied Naming in the predella of his own altarpiece now in the Museo civico in Prato.

== History ==
Naming and Funeral were recorded in 1778 as belonging to the art dealer Giovanni Vincenzo Frati, who in January that year proposed that Giuseppe Pelli purchase them for the Uffizi, of which Pelli was the director. It has been theorised that there was an unknown altarpiece by Angelico in Santa Lucia dei Magnoli in Florence.

== List ==
- St James the Great Frees Hermogenes, 26,8x23,8 cm, Fort Worth, Kimbell Art Museum
- Naming of John the Baptist, 26x52,9 cm, Museo Nazionale di San Marco
- Funeral of the Virgin Mary, Philadelphia Museum of Art
- St Dominic Meets St Francis, 26x26,7 cm, California Palace of the Legion of Honor, San Francisco
- St Lucy's Vision of Saint Agatha, private collection of Richard L. Feigen, New York

== Panels ==
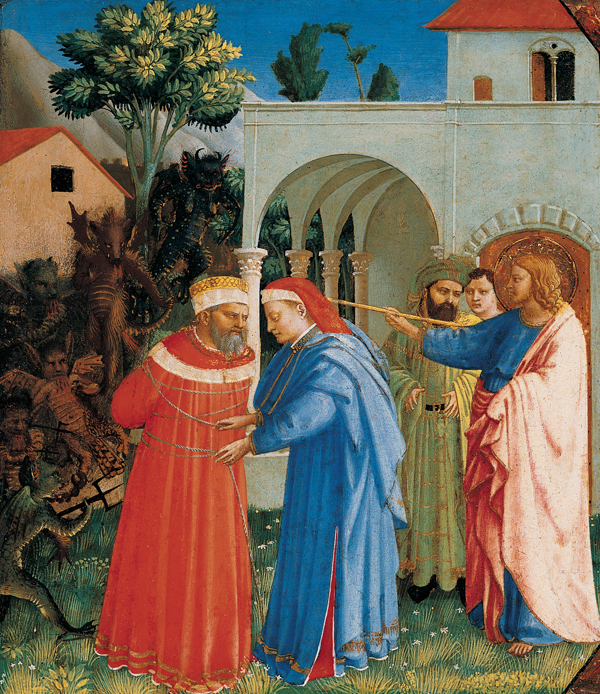
The Apostle Saint James the Great Freeing the Magician Hermogenes

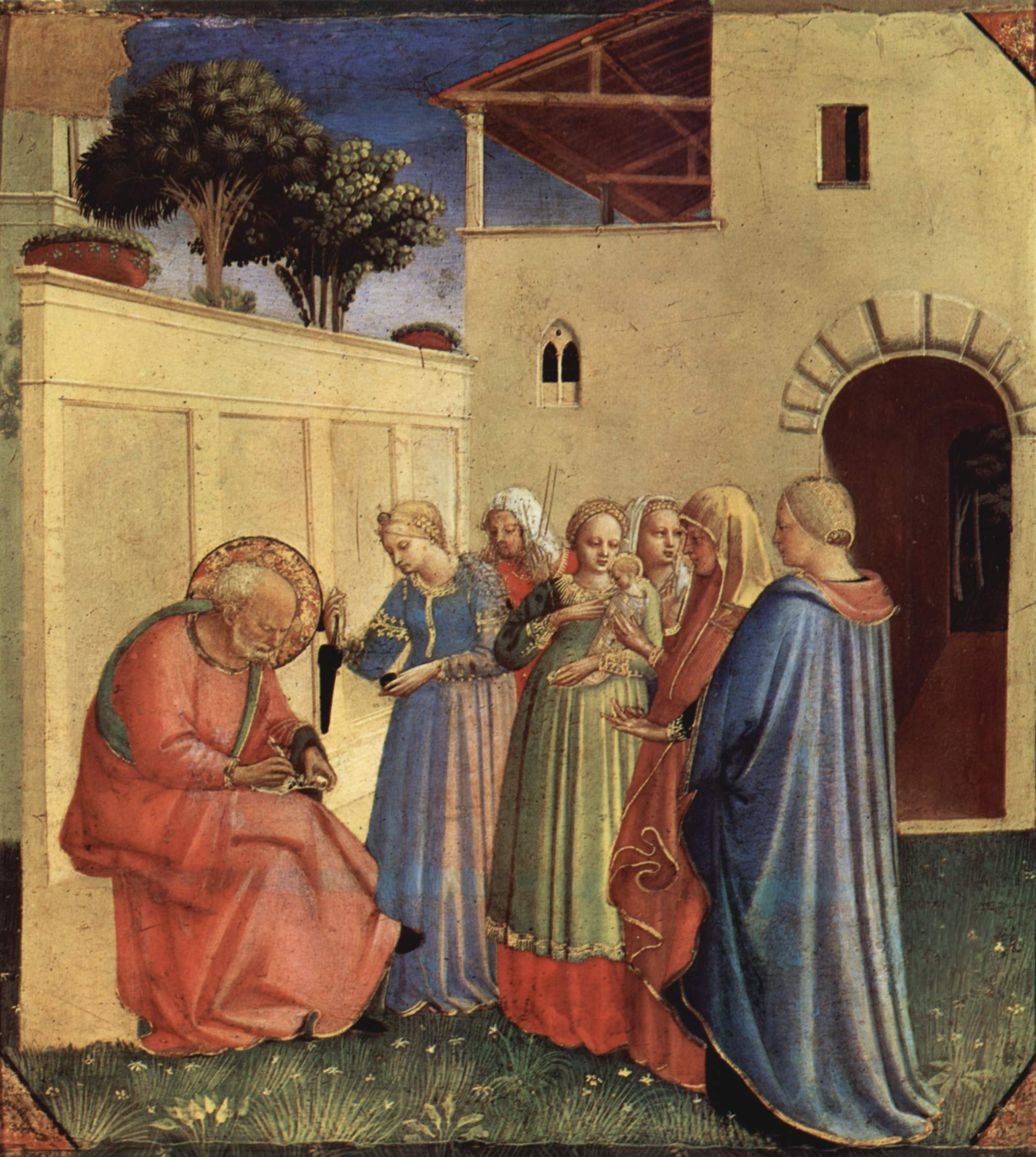
The Naming of St John the Baptist

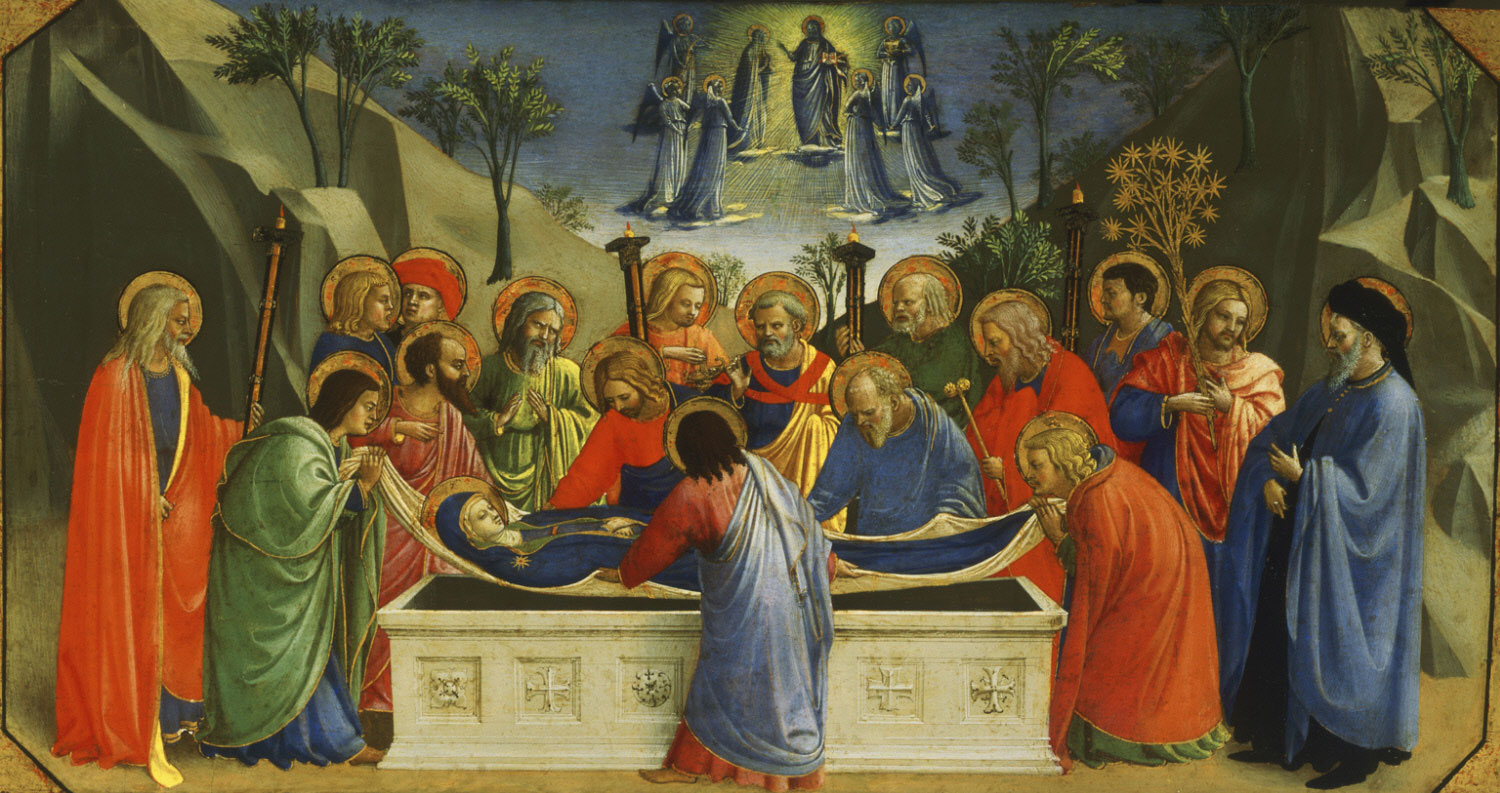
Dormition of the Virgin, Philadelphia

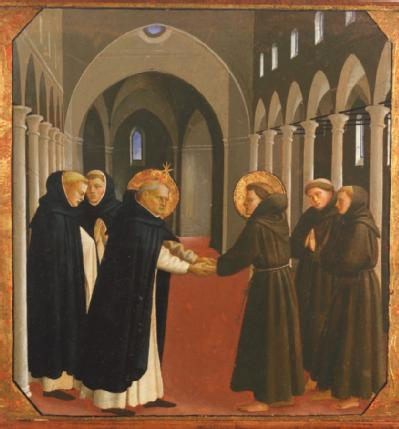
St Dominic Meets St Francis

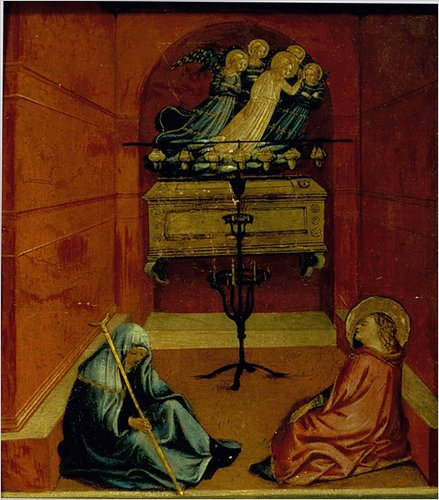
Vision of Saint Lucy
