= Annunciation (Fra Angelico, San Marco) =

Fresco by Fra Angelico

The Annunciation
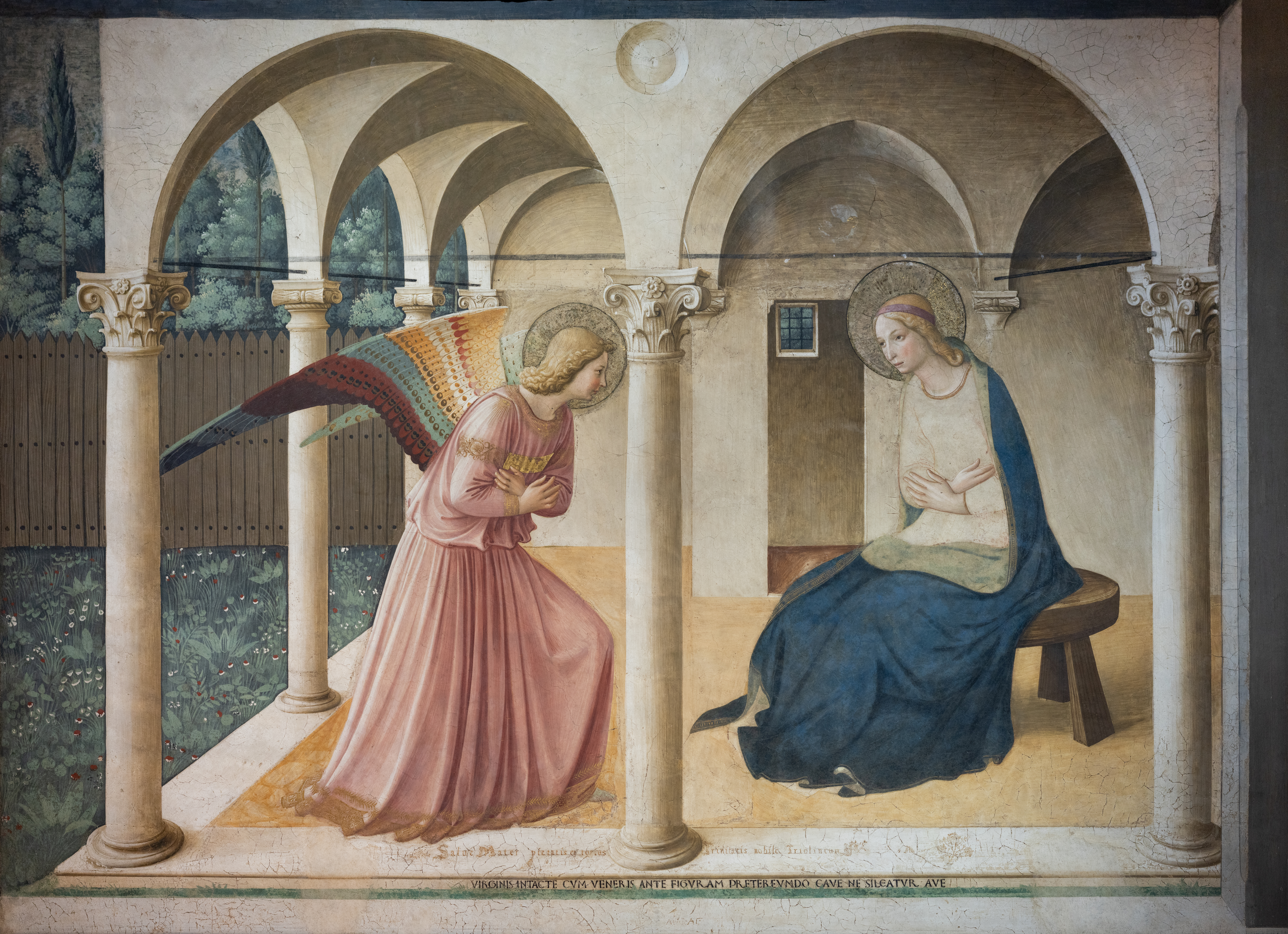
- Fra Angelico, The Annunciation
- Artist: Fra Angelico
- Year: 1440–1445
- Type: Fresco
- Subject: Gabriel and Mary
- Location: Convent of San Marco, Florence

The Annunciation (c. 1440–1445) is an Early Renaissance fresco by Fra Angelico in the Convent of San Marco in Florence, Italy. When Cosimo de' Medici rebuilt the convent, he commissioned Fra Angelico to decorate the walls with intricate frescos. This included the altarpiece, the inside of the friars' cells, the friars' cloister, the chapter house, and inside the corridors; around fifty pieces in total. All of the paintings were done by Angelico himself or under his direct supervision. Out of all of the frescos at the convent, the Annunciation is the most well known in the art world.

The Annunciation is not Fra Angelico's first painting on that theme nor his only one in the convent. His works are scattered across the world in well-known museums and galleries including the Prado. He is credited as the inventor of this type of composition, where Gabriel visits Mary in an outdoor setting. A typical Gothic Annunciation painting contained the archangel Gabriel visiting the Virgin Mary indoors and with Mary enthroned. The figures would appear flat, static, and unrealistic. This painting in particular is supposed to have "achieved heights of singular elegance." The way it handles space and lighting is revolutionary because it is a transition out of the Gothic period and into the Renaissance. Previous versions had no spatial awareness. The figures seemed to float in the air, and lines did not end in a vanishing point. This caused them to be lopsided and disproportional.

This particular version of the Annunciation is located at the top of the stairs on the first floor where the San Marco dormitories are located - on the north side. This is one of only three frescoes that Fra Angelico painted outside on the walls of the corridor instead of inside the cells. The staircase has undergone many renovations including modifications to the window which affects the amount of light entering the convent. This fresco was meant to be viewed under low light. When viewing the painting, there is an invisible light source that would have made additional light unnecessary to the friars viewing the painting. If visitors to the convent viewed the painting today, it would not look authentic. There are now lights illuminating it from many different angles. With its placement at the top of the stairs Fra Angelico sought to bring the scene into the convent and into the daily lives of the friars. A lighter painting at the time would have been used for decoration, while a darker one was meant for reflection and prayer.

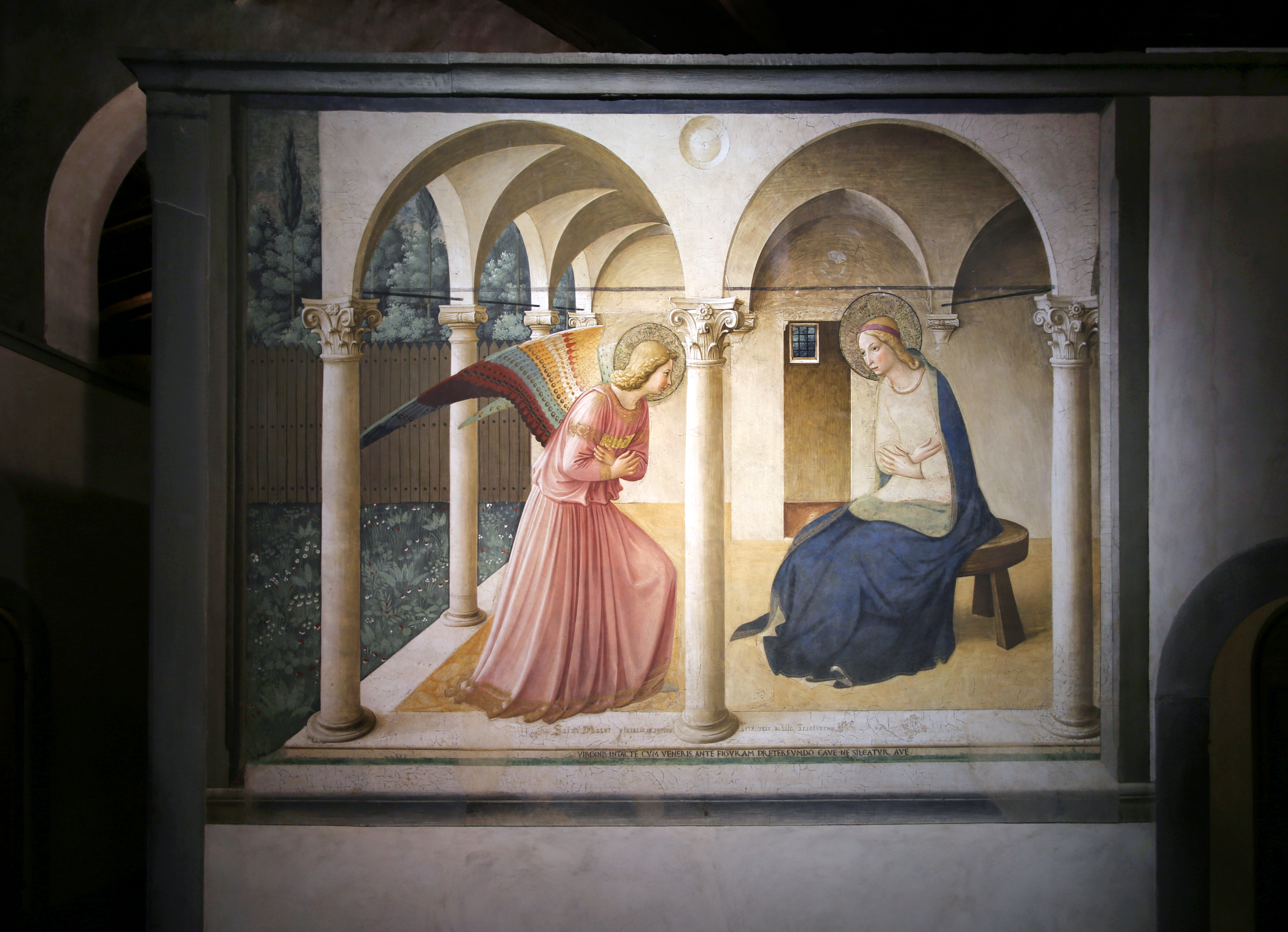
The Annunciation viewed from the top of the stairs to the cells, with the east corridor visible at the left

The frescos inside the cells at the convent of San Marco were done with reserve. "They were intended for contemplation and meditation and a reflection on poverty. Gold leaf and azurite were reserved for Cosimo de' Medici in his private cell and for the frescos in public spaces in the corridors." The gold leaf and azurite were extravagant materials and were a luxury only given to Cosimo because he was a wealthy patron. The friars were given paintings in their cells for the sole purpose of praying. Even with the gold and azurite, the Annunciation in the north dormitory would have still been relatively dull because of its location in a convent. In the Annunciation Gabriel is seen approaching Mary outdoors in the cloister. Overlooking the loggia, an open-sided room of a convent that faces the outside, it is supported by columns. Gabriel is seen clad in pink and gold with multi-coloured wings stooping down with his gaze fixed on Mary. He is seen with his arms bent at the elbow with his hands crossed over his chest gesturing to Mary. Mary is depicted as sweet and innocent, yet taken aback by Gabriel's arrival. Her innocence and virginity is represented by the Hortus Conclusus seen through the fence and the window in the background. Mary is seated facing him in her typical blue indicating her royal status and her purity. Her arms are folded in the same manner as Gabriel but this gesture shows her acceptance, humility, and submission. The cloister is surrounded by columns from the Composite order. They are all supporting Roman arches. Together they all work to frame Gabriel and Mary and highlight the focal point of the piece. The centre column in the foreground separates the painting into two spaces putting Gabriel and Mary at opposite ends, separating them but at the same time keeping them together.

This fresco was not intended just for aesthetic purposes. Running across the loggia at the bottom of the fresco there is an inscription that instructs the viewer: "Virginis Intacte Cvm Veneris Ante Figvram Preterevndo Cave Ne Sileatvr Ave." It means when you come before the image of the Ever-Virgin take care that you do not neglect to say an Ave. This was a daily reminder for the monks to pray.

The novelist Henry James wrote of the painting, "You may be as little of a formal Christian as Fra Angelico was much of one, you yet feel admonished by spiritual decency to let so yearning a view of the Christian story work its utmost will on you".
