= The Last Judgment (Fra Angelico, Florence) =

Painting by Fra Angelico

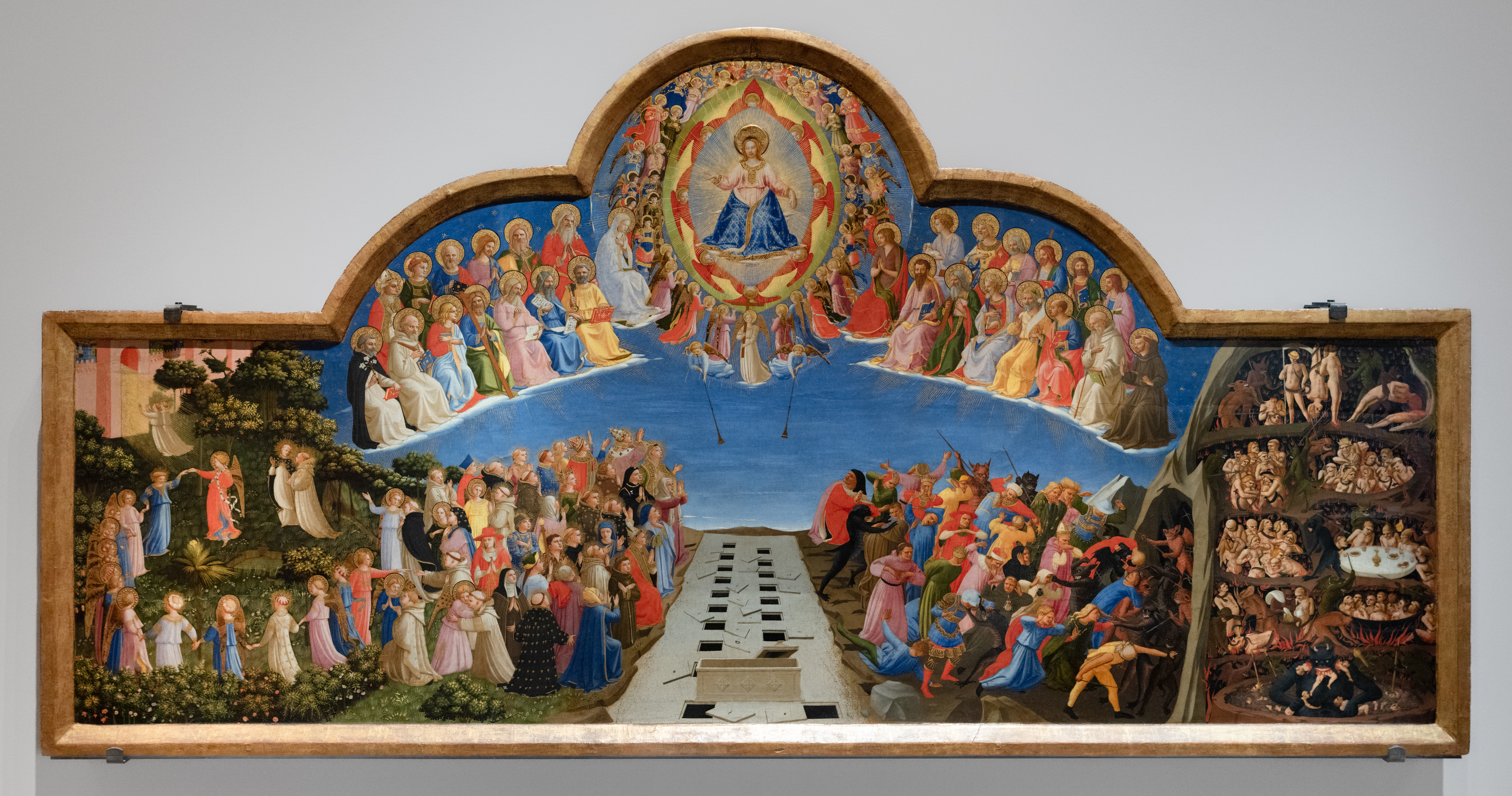
- Artist: Fra Angelico
- Year: 1425–1430
- Medium: tempera on panel
- Location: San Marco, Florence

The Last Judgment (tempera on panel) is a painting by the Renaissance artist Fra Angelico. It was commissioned by the Camaldolese Order for the newly elected abbot, the humanist scholar Ambrogio Traversari. It is variously dated to c. 1425, 1425–1430 and 1431. It was originally sited in the church of Santa Maria degli Angeli and now is in the museum of San Marco, Florence. It is not to be confused with another Fra Angelico Last Judgement in the Gemäldegalerie, Berlin.

== Description ==
Like most of Fra Angelico's work, the iconography is standard for the contemporary treatments of the Last Judgement. Among the most common subjects of painting in churches, it is found more often on walls. In the top centre of the picture, Christ sits in judgement on a white throne surrounded by angels, Mary, John, and the saints. Christ is shown as judge of the living and dead, his left hand pointing down to Hell, his right up to Heaven. On Christ's right hand is paradise, with angels leading the saved through a beautiful garden into a shining city. In the middle are the broken tombs of the risen dead, come out of their graves to be finally judged. On Christ's left demons drive the damned into Hell, where the wicked are tormented. At the very bottom Satan chews on three of the damned, and grasps two others.

== Details ==
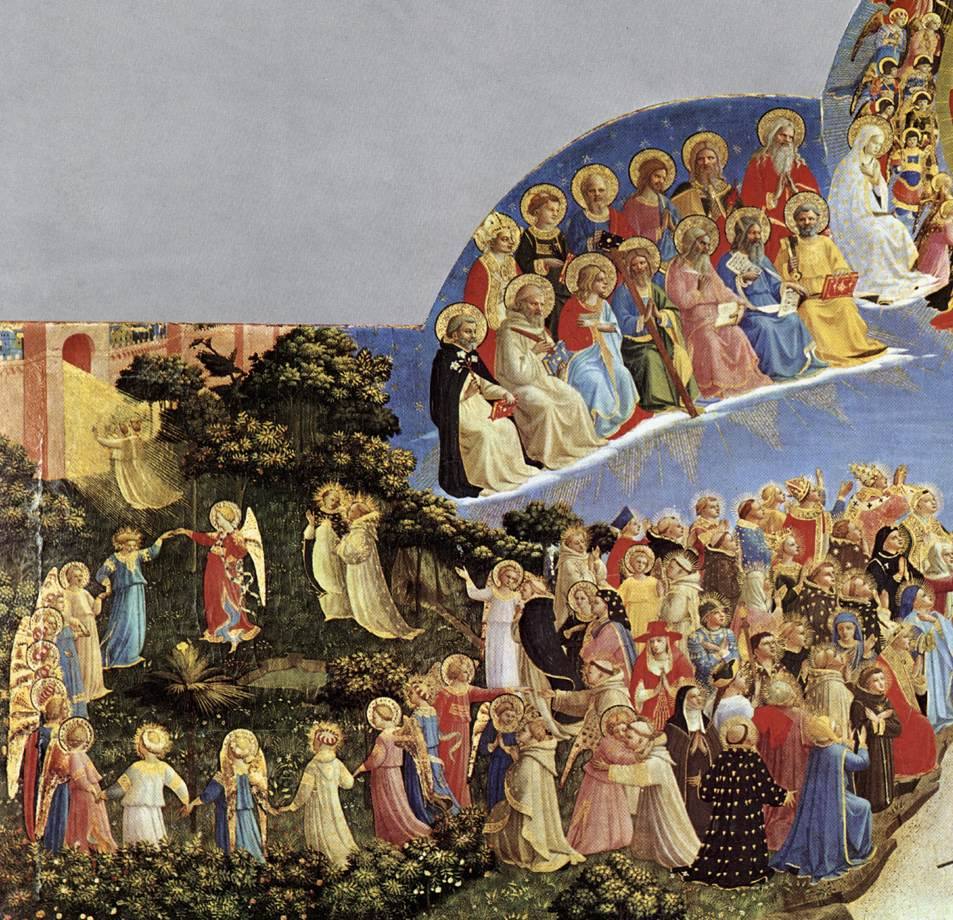
Paradise

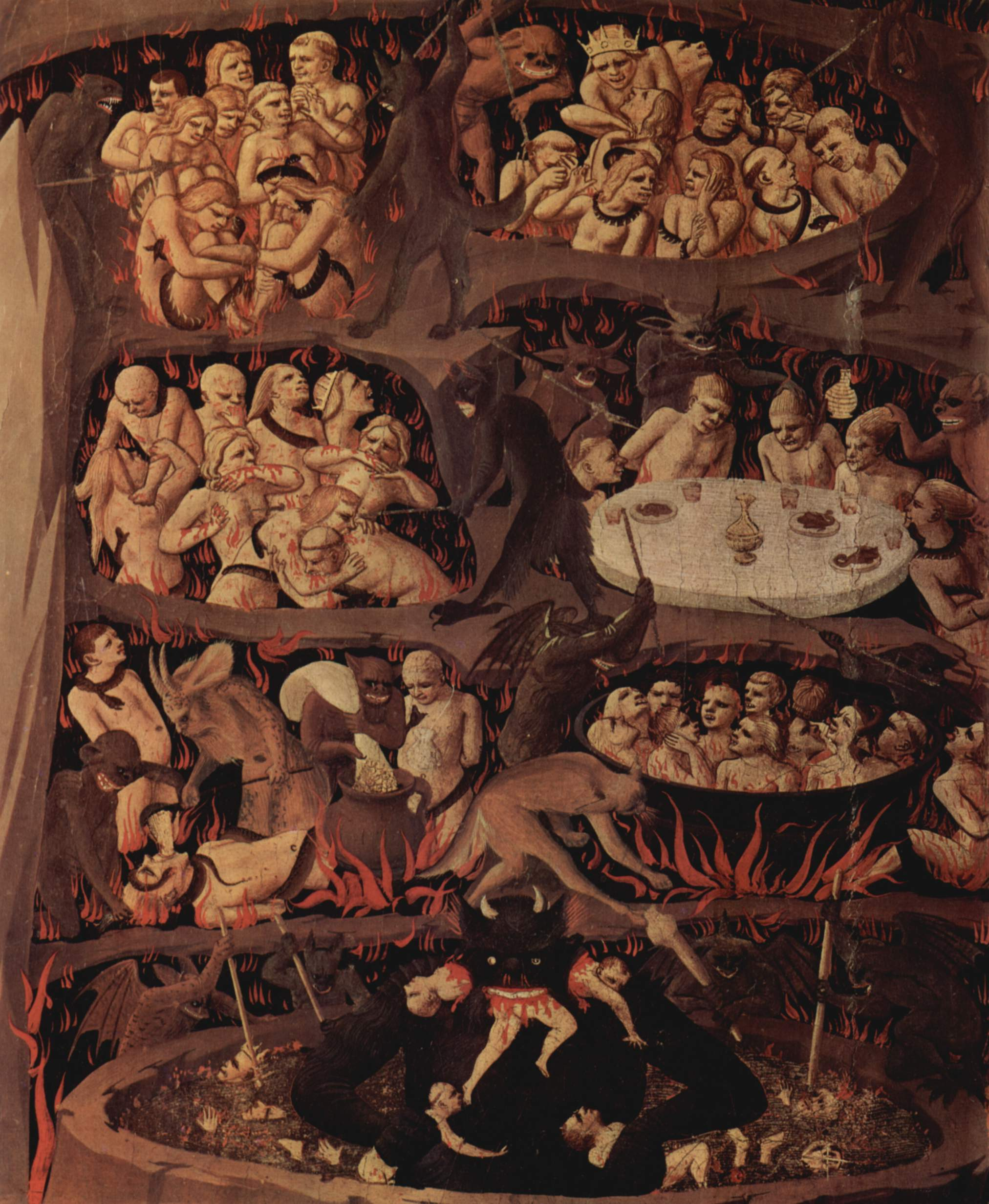
Hell

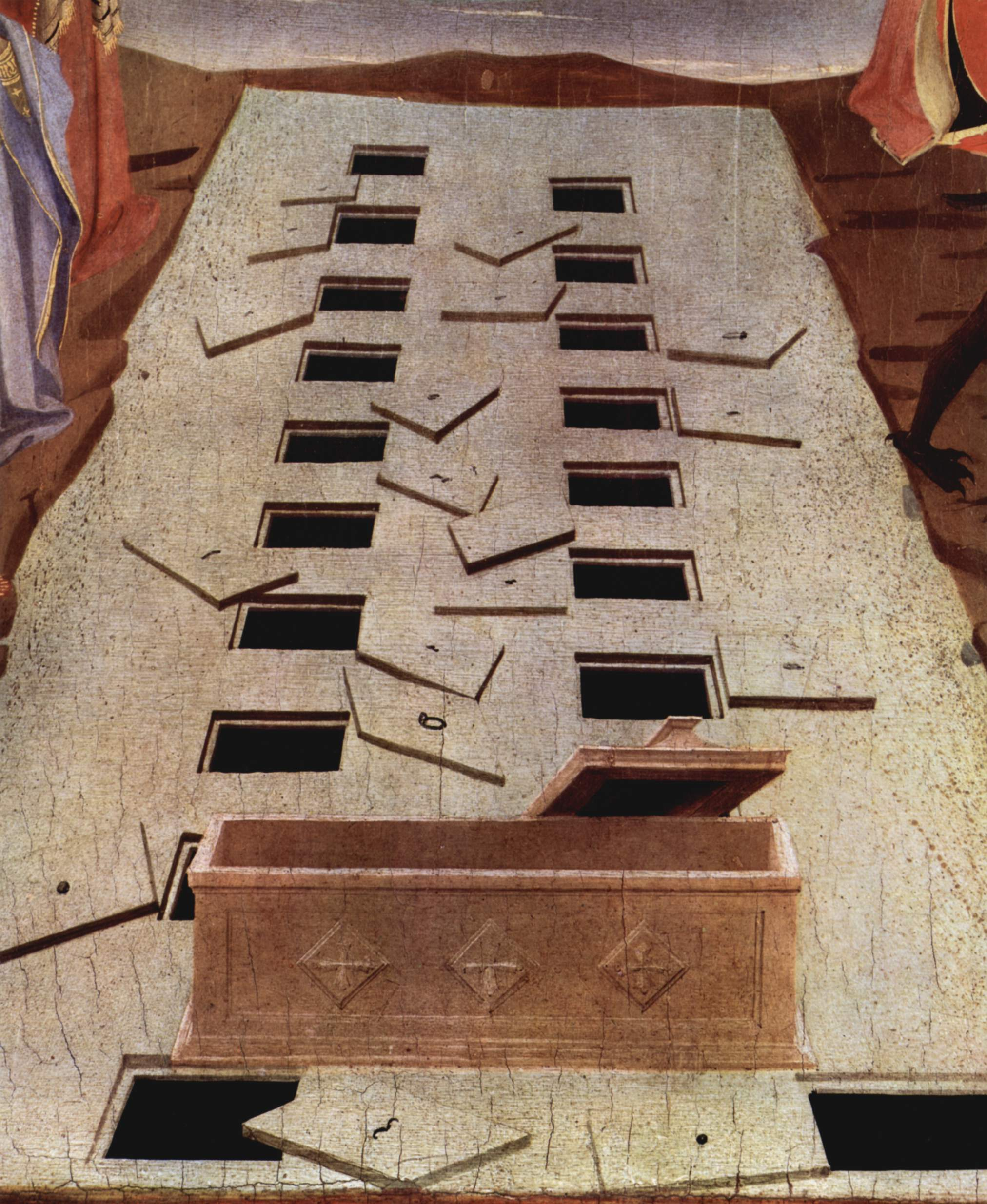
Detail of the broken tombs

== See also ==
- Doom (painting)
- The Last Judgment (Michelangelo)
- The Last Judgment (Bosch triptych)
- The Last Judgment (Memling)
- Beaune Altarpiece
