= Fiesole Altarpiece =

Painting by Fra Angelico and Lorenzo di Credi

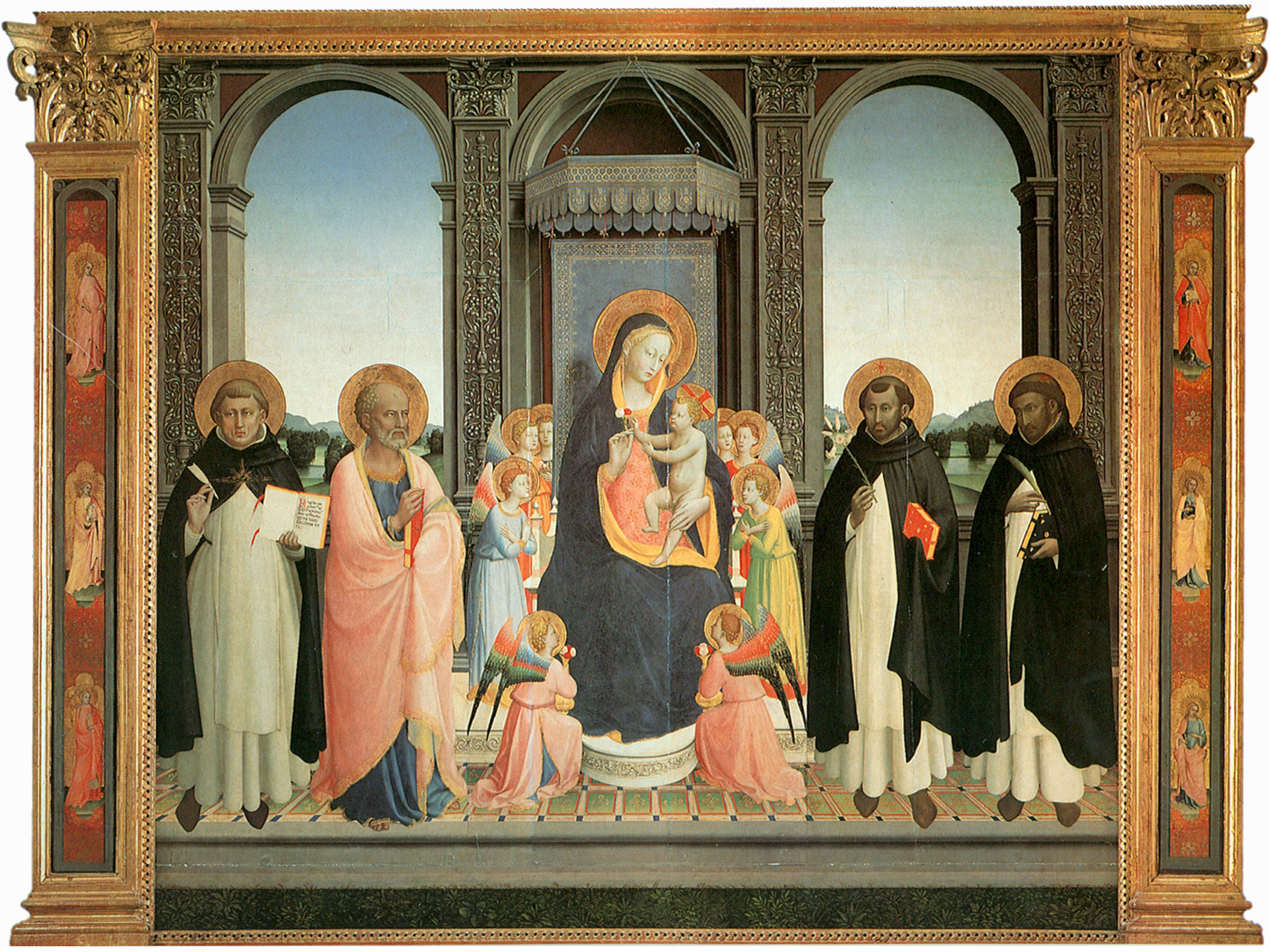
- Artist: Fra Angelico and Lorenzo di Credi
- Year: 1424–1501
- Medium: Tempera on panel
- Location: Convent of San Domenico, Fiesole

The Fiesole Altarpiece is a painting by the Italian early Renaissance master Fra Angelico, executed around 1424–1425. It is housed in the Convent of San Domenico, Fiesole, central Italy. The background was repainted by Lorenzo di Credi in 1501.

== History ==
The altarpiece is among the earliest known works by Fra Angelico. It was originally commissioned for the high altar in the convent's church, but was later moved to a side altar where it is currently visible.

In 1501 Lorenzo di Credi repainted the background, which was probably gilded, with a more modern landscape featuring a throne with baldachin, trompe-l'oeil reliefs and two landscapes between pillars. The Gothic cusps were also eliminated in that occasion.

== Description ==
The work is a Maestà, a Madonna enthroned, a theme particularly fashionable in Florentine art at the time. The central group with the Madonna and Child is surrounded by eight adoring angels depicted in smaller size. The saints Thomas Aquinas, Barnabas, Dominic and Peter of Verona are at the sides: these were three saints of the Dominican Order (the same owning the convent) and the namesake of Barnaba degli Agli, a Florentine man who had donated 6,000 florins for the convent's restoration and enlargement.

The naked Child is shown while grasping two flowers: a white rose, symbol of purity, and a red one, a forecast of his future passion connected with the Eucharist: the panel was in fact painted for the church's high altar, where the celebration of this sacrament occurs.

The composition resembles that of Masaccio's San Giovenale Triptych (1422). The scheme is also similar to the cartoon of the Assumption by Lorenzo Ghiberti for the windows in the façade of Florence Cathedral (1404–1405). It is also one of the most ancient polyptychs in which the figures are in the same painted surface, without being divided into different compartments.

Elements such as the less evolved perspective and the tile pavements (also found in an anonymous Florentine triptych from 1419 and an altarpiece by Angelico himself at San Gimignano) led to the datation of some three years before his San Pietro Martire Triptych, which is documented from 1428.

The work had a predella, now at the National Gallery, London and portraying Adoration of Saints, Prophets and Members of the Dominican Order. The latter also houses a tondo with St. Romulus, perhaps located above the polyptych. The side pillars were decorated by ten small panels with saints and blessed, four of which are known today: two are at the Musée Condé of Chantilly and two in private collections.

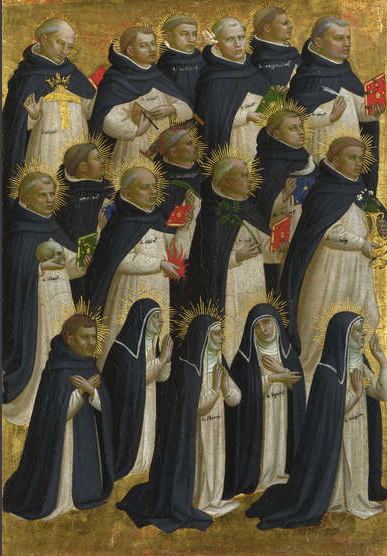
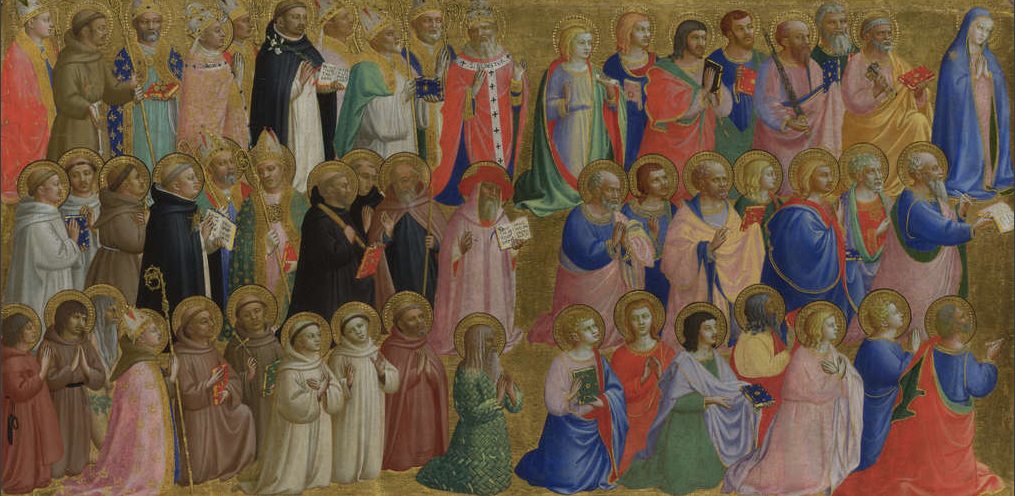
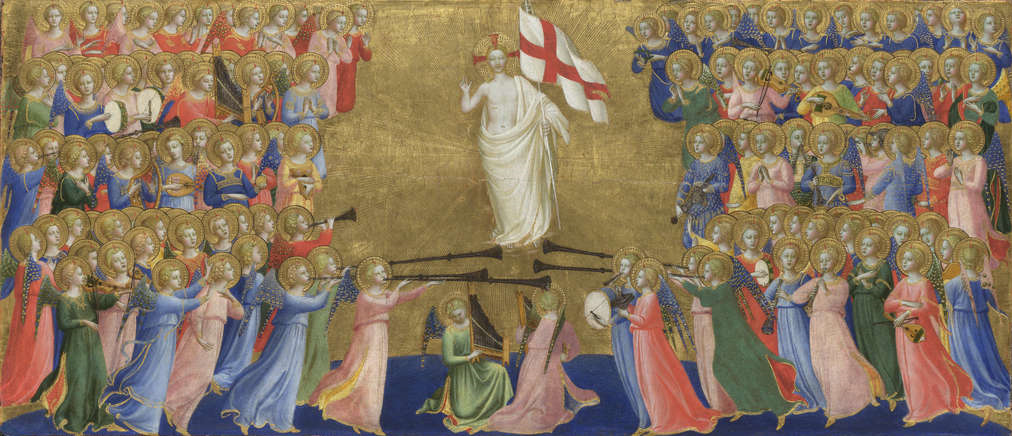
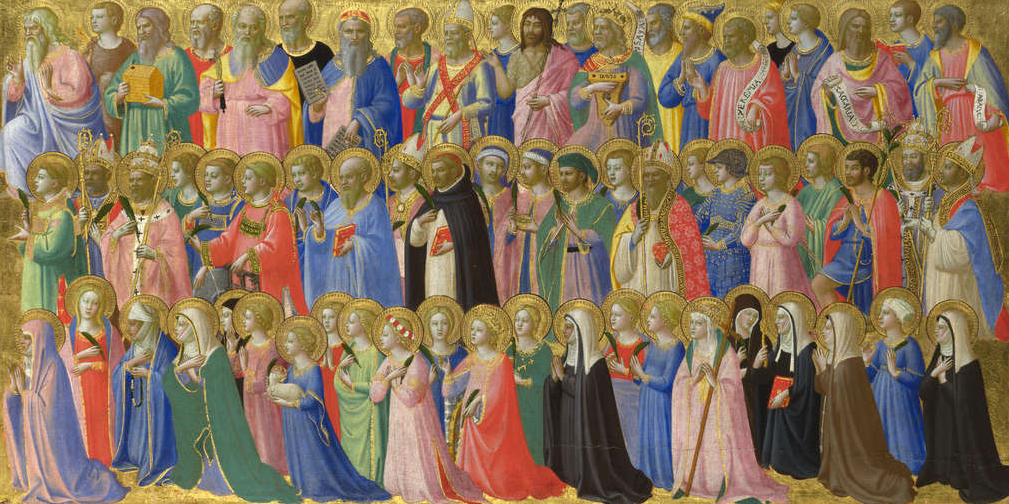
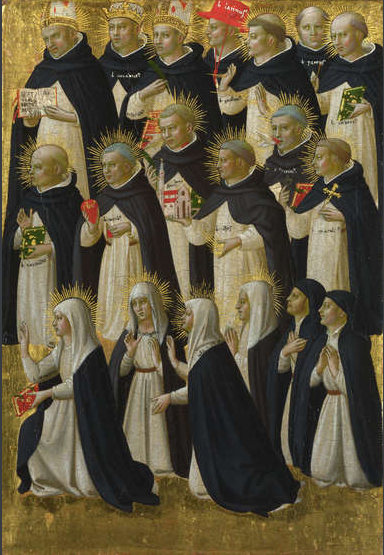

Predella of the Fiesole Altarpiece

== Sources ==
- Pope-Hennessy, John (1981). Beato Angelico. Florence: Scala.
- Cornini, Guido (2000). Beato Angelico. Florence: Giunti. ISBN 88-09-01602-5.
