= Madonna of Humility (Fra Angelico) =

1430s painting by Fra Angelico

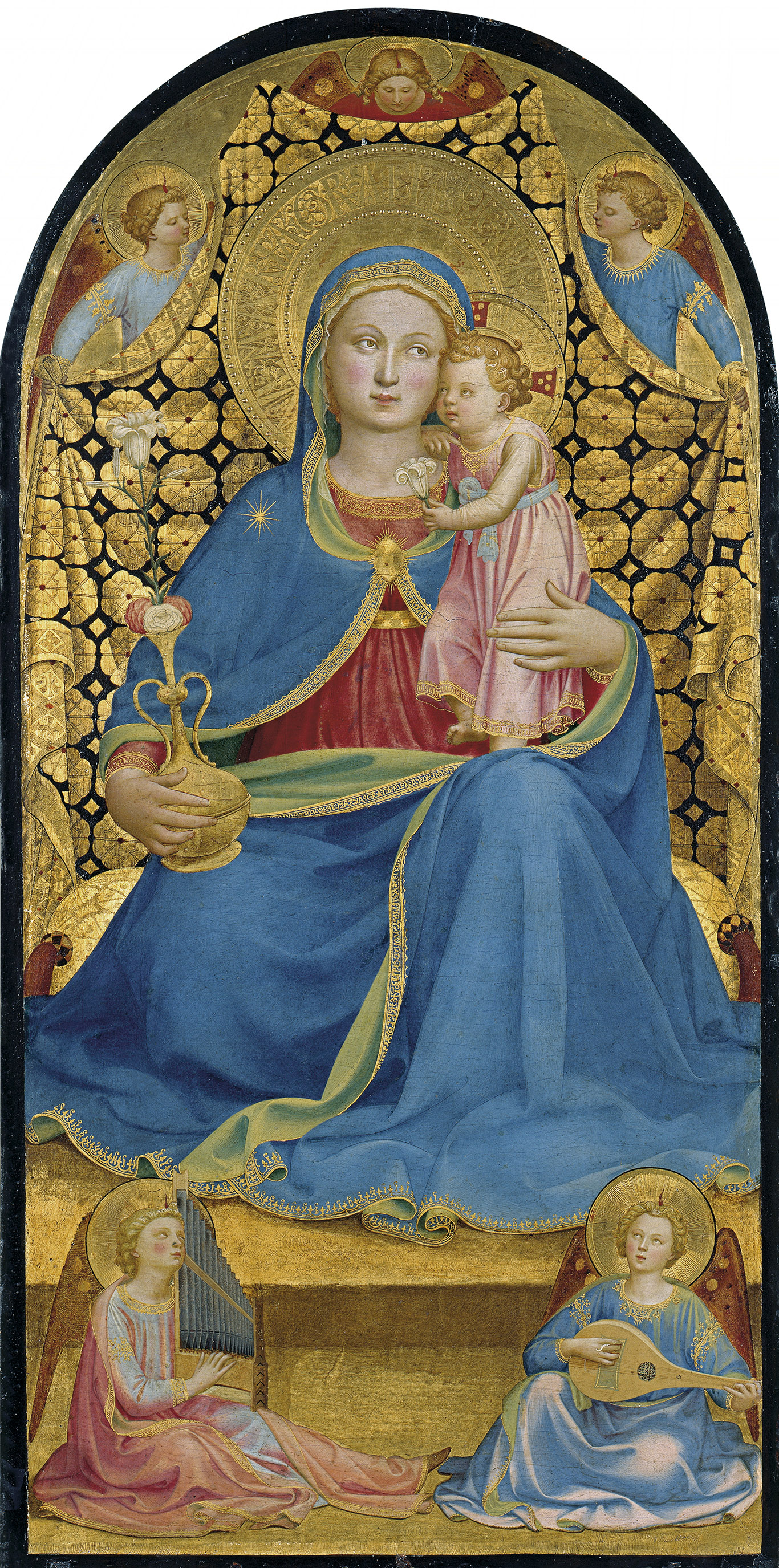
- Artist: Fra Angelico
- Year: 1433–1435
- Medium: Tempera on wood
- Dimensions: 147 cm × 91 cm (58 in × 36 in)
- Location: Museu Nacional d'Art de Catalunya, Barcelona

The Madonna of Humility is a tempera-on-wood painting by Fra Angelico, executed in 1433–1435, which belongs to the Thyssen-Bornemisza Museum in Madrid and is conserved on loan at the National Art Museum of Catalonia.

== Description ==
The Virgin seated on a cushion placed directly on the ground with the child standing on her lap, holds a vase in her left hand which contains roses and a lily, symbols of motherhood and purity. The Child, who is also holding a lily, rests his forehead on his mother's cheek. They are set under a cloth of honour made of gold and black embroidered brocade held by three angels, while two more angels are seated on the ground playing an organ and a lute.

The monumental figures, the splendour of the clothes, the modulated light and the use of the blue colour place this panel in the purest fifteenth-century Italian style. The work has been identified as the one described by Giorgio Vasari in 1568 in the home of the Gondi family, in Florence, where it formed part of a polyptych.
