= Life of Moses =

Life of Moses may refer to:

- the life of Moses as recorded in the Bible
- Life of Moses, a work by Philo
- Life of Moses, a work by Gregory of Nyssa
- Life of Moses, a Slavic translation of the Hebrew Chronicle of Moses
- Life of Moses, a cycle of frescoes in the Sistine Chapel
- The Life of Moses, a 1909 American silent epic film
