= De Modo Orandi =

13th-century treatise on the prayer life of St. Dominic

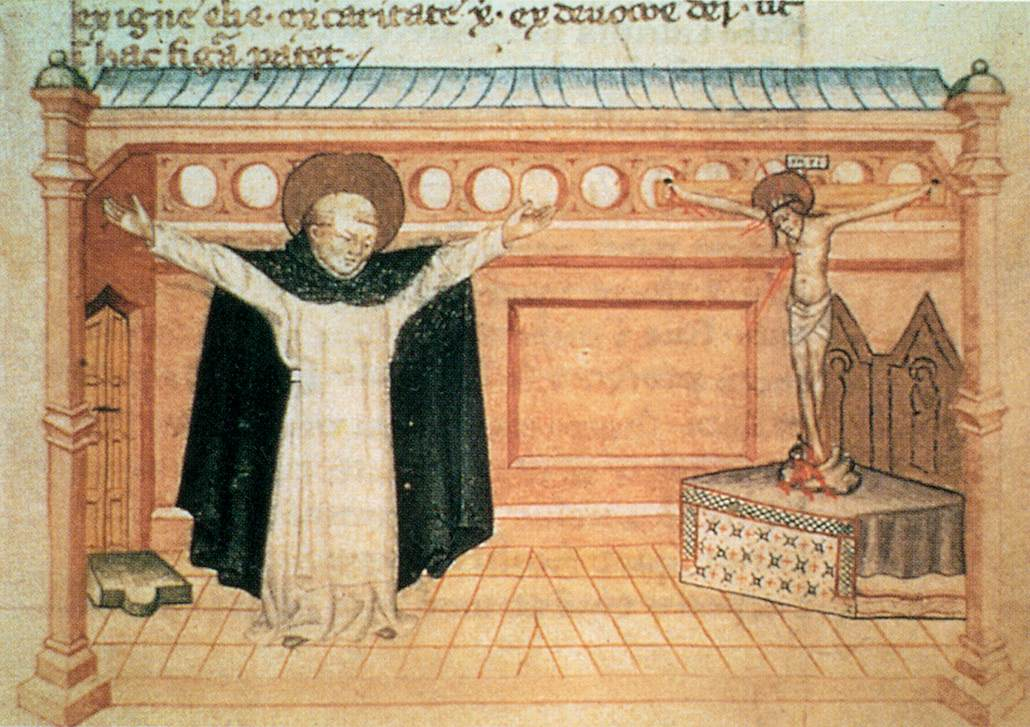
Image from the manuscript of De Modo Orandi in the Vatican Library

De Modo Orandi (English: The Nine Ways of Prayer of St. Dominic) is an anonymous thirteenth-century treatise on the prayer life of St. Dominic, the founder of the Dominican Order. The treatise is based on the testimony of Sister Cecilia of the Monastery of St. Agnes at Bologna. There are three extant manuscripts with illustrations of the saint's nine prayer postures. One is housed in the Vatican Library. The treatise presents nine prayer postures used by the saint each connected to a specific virtue. Below is the breakdown provided by William Hood.

| Mode | Sentiment | Posture |
|---|---|---|
| One | Reverence | Bow |
| Two | Humility | Prostration |
| Three | Penitence | Flagellation |
| Four | Compassion | Genuflection |
| Five | Meditation | Standing with hands before chest |
| Six | Imploring divine power | Standing with arms outstreatched |
| Seven | Ecstasy | Standing with hands over head |
| Eight | Recollection | Reading |
| Nine | Enthusiasm for preaching | Conversation |

The work itself does not break out the postures and virtues in such a neat manner. Others, for instance, connect the ninth mode conversatio in Latin not to the English conversation but to travel i.e. praying while strolling about. The art historian William Hood argues that De Modo Orandi was the inspiration for the prayer postures of Saint Dominic, Thomas Aquinas, and Peter of Verona who appear in the meditative wall frescos at San Marco, Florence.
