= Convent of San Domenico, Fiesole =

Dominican monastery in Fiesole, Italy

Coordinates: 43°48′04″N 11°17′09″E

Convent of San Domenico
- Convento di San Domenico
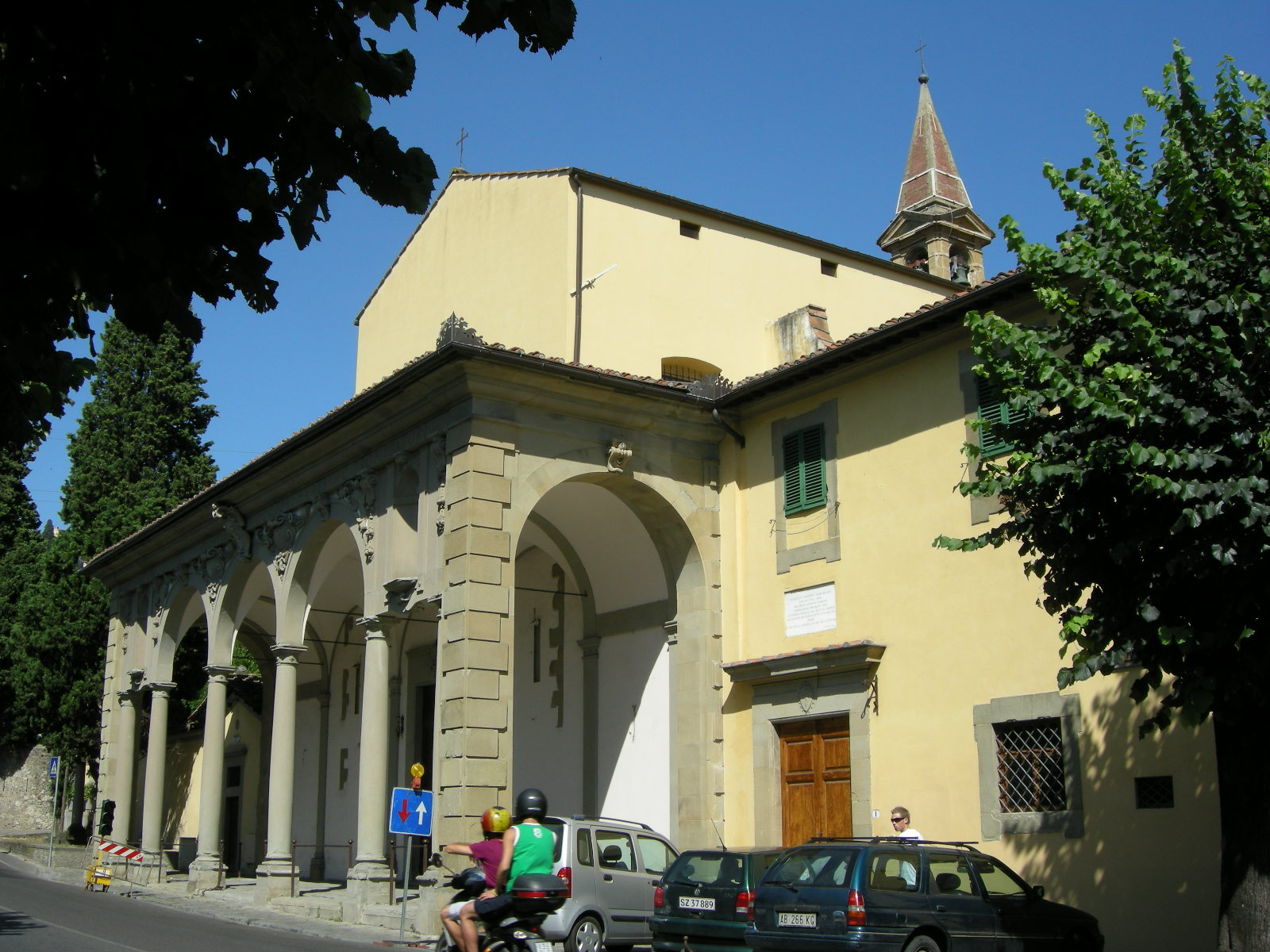
- Entrance portico to the convent
- Interactive map of Convent of San Domenico

Monastery information
- Other name: Conventino
- Order: Dominican Order
- Established: 1406

People
- Founders: Giovanni Dominici and the bishop of Fiesole Jacopo Altoviti

Site
- Location: Fiesole, Metropolitan City of Florence, Tuscany
- Website: www.sandomenicodifiesole.it

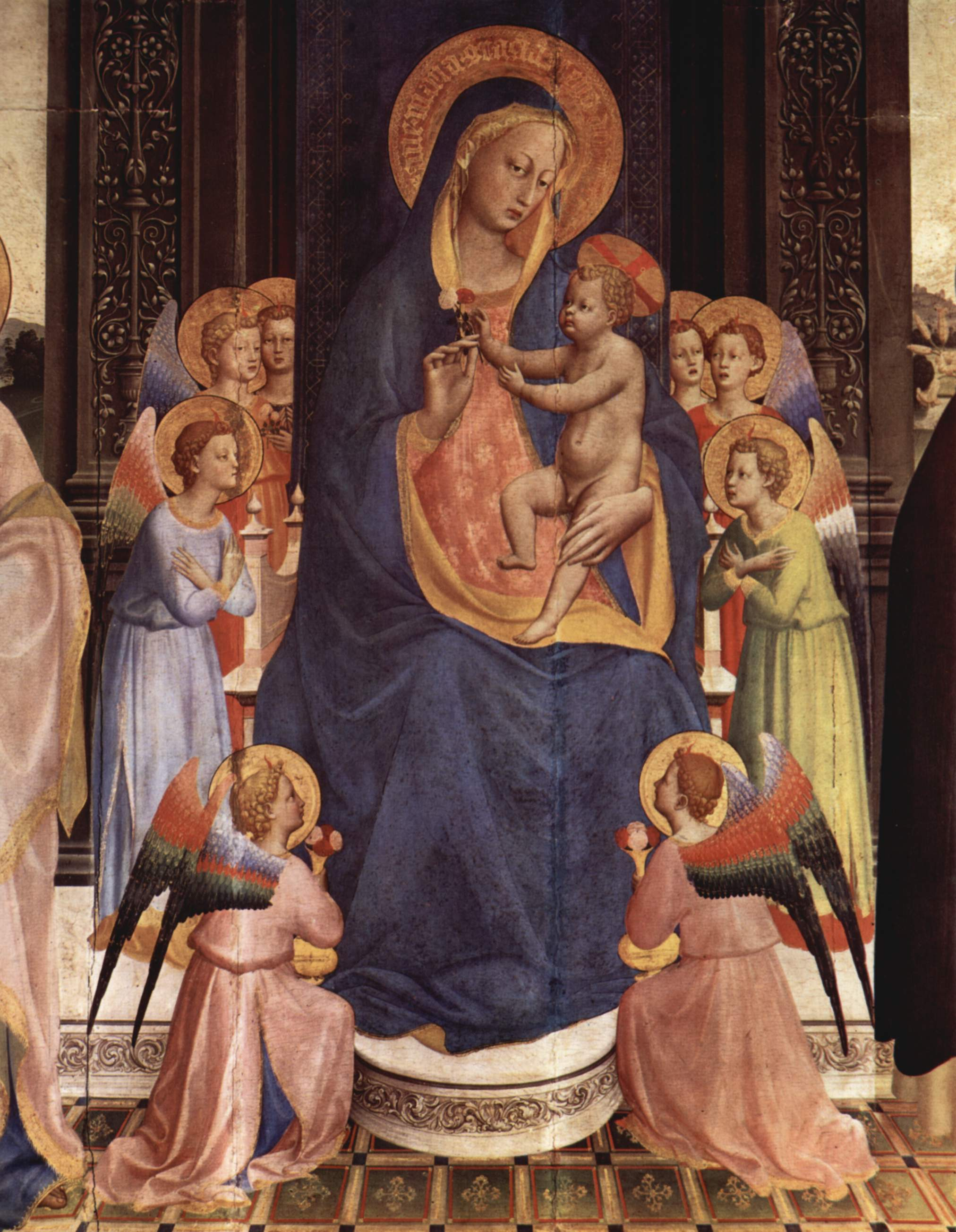
Central part of the Pala di Fiesole by Fra Angelico

The Convent of San Domenico (Italian: Convento di San Domenico) is a Dominican convent in Fiesole, Italy, situated between the hill of Fiesole and the suburbs of Florence. It was founded in 1406 and completed in 1435 on the initiative of Giovanni Dominici and the bishop of Fiesole, Jacopo Altoviti, both of them friars at the Basilica of Santa Maria Novella in Florence.

Fra Angelico was a friar at the convent, and painted several artworks for it, including the Fiesole Altarpiece and the Coronation of the Virgin (now in the Louvre of Paris). Pietro Perugino's Madonna with Child between Saints John the Baptist and Sebastian, painted in 1493, is now at the Uffizi Gallery in Florence. Also at the convent is the 'Baptism' of Lorenzo di Credi, a free rendering of the Baptism in the Uffizi, the panel attributed to master Verrocchio and to Leonardo himself.

Since 2016, the Convent of San Domenico has hosted the Language Centre, the Human Resources Service and a part of the Budget and Financial Affairs Service of the European University Institute.
