= Portrait of Girolamo Savonarola =

Painting by Fra Bartolomeo

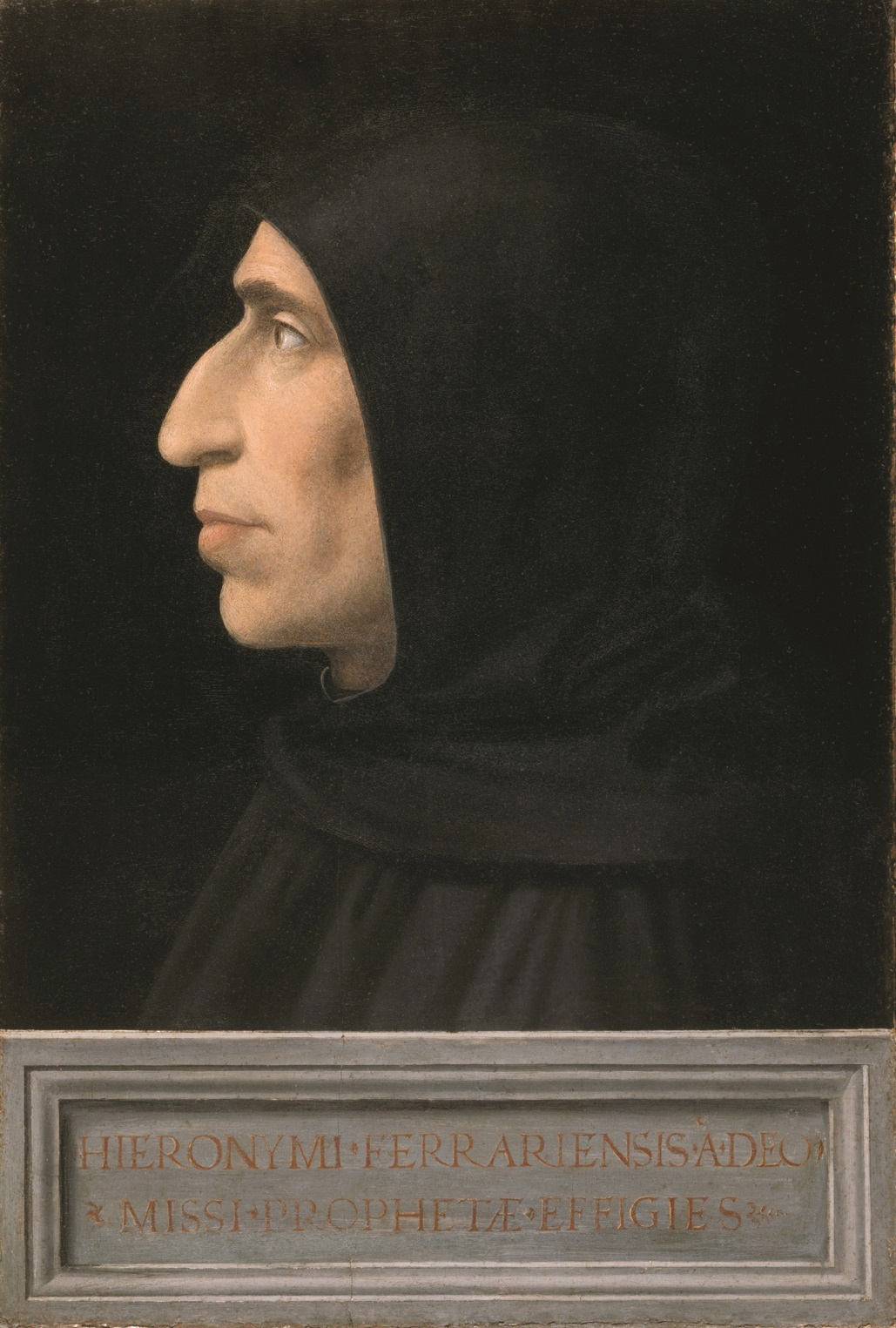
- Artist: Fra Bartolomeo
- Year: c. 1498
- Medium: oil on panel
- Dimensions: 46.5 cm × 32.5 cm (18.3 in × 12.8 in)
- Location: Museo di San Marco, Florence

The Portrait of Girolamo Savonarola is an oil-on-panel painting by the Italian Renaissance artist Fra Bartolomeo, created c. 1498. This portrait is believed to have been made when reformer Girolamo Savonarola was still alive and when Fra Bartolomeo was a follower of his renewal religious movement in Florence. It is held at the Museo di San Marco, in Florence.

== History and description ==
Savonarola was involved in a religious movement that attempted to fight what he believed to be the corrupt ways of living in Florence, which led him to conflict with the political and religious authorities of the city, and eventually to his excommunication and execution in 1498. He attracted many followers and encouraged the creation of the famous bonfire of the vanities, where many worldly and secular belongings were burned. This movement also attracted some artists, including Fra Bartolomeo, who is believed to have burned some nude studies from his youth there. After Savonarola's death, Fra Bartolomeo would enter the Dominican order, in 1500, and temporarily renounce painting, until being encouraged to return to this activity by his order, in 1504.

This portrait was made most likely in the last year of Savonarola's life, and expresses the artist admiration and support for the religious reformer. He is seen in profile, looking to his left, in a dark background, wearing dark religious clothing, including a hood. His profile appears sharp and decided, and the latin inscription below expresses Fra Bartolomeo support for his religious mission: "Portrait of the prophet Jerome of Ferrara, sent by God."

The portrait was part of the exhibition Fra Bartolommeo – The Divine Renaissance, held in the Museum Boijmans Van Beuningen, in Rotterdam, in 2016.
