= Virgin Reliquaries =

Panel paintings by Fra Giovanni Masi

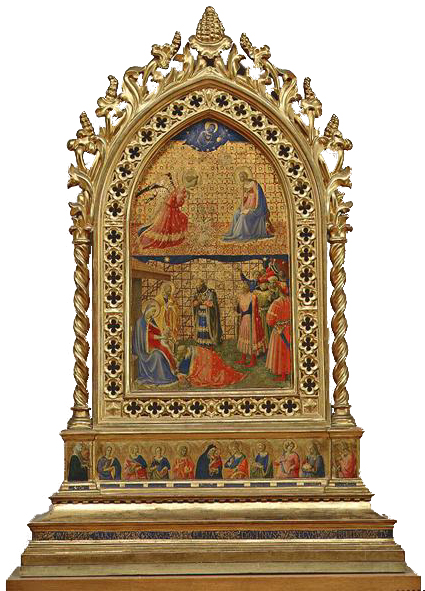
Annunciation and Adoration of the Magi

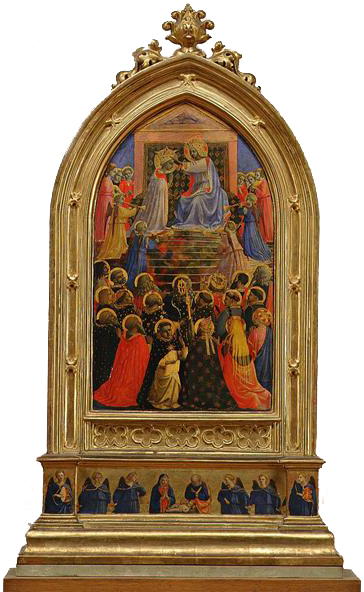
Coronation of the Virgin

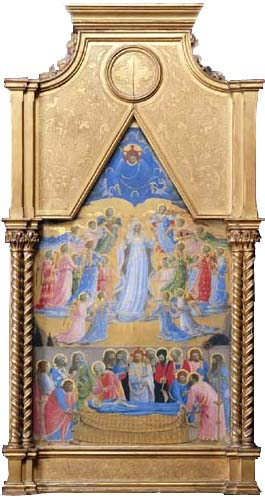
Death and Assumption of the Virgin Mary

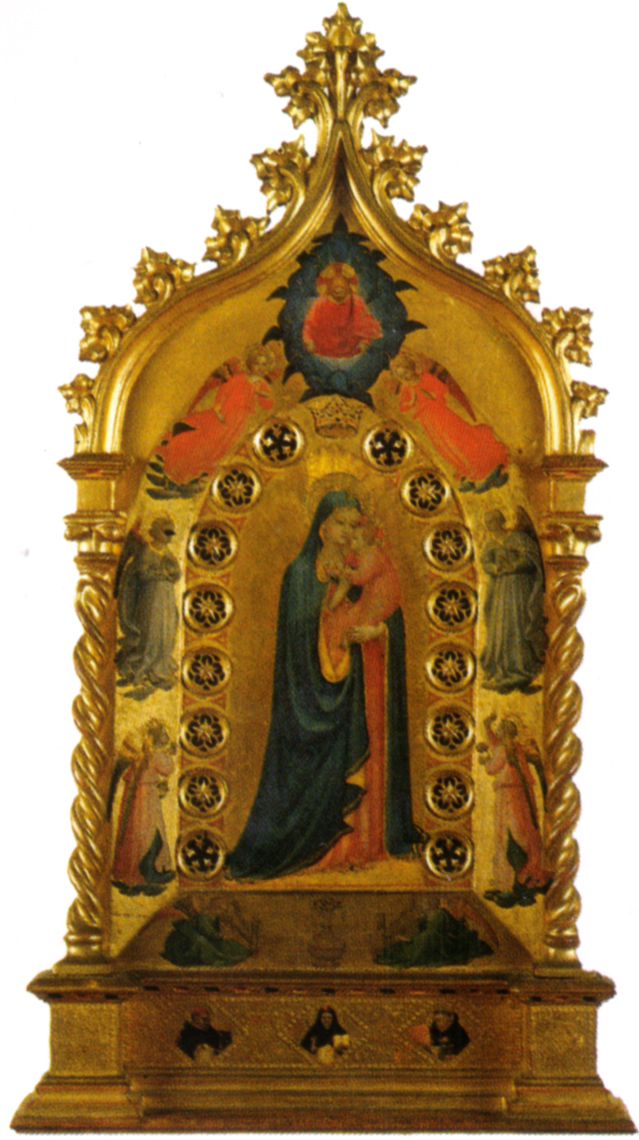
Mary, Star of the Sea

The Virgin Reliquaries are four 1434 panel paintings by Fra Giovanni Masi after drawings by Fra Angelico, intended as tabernacle-reliquaries for the Convent of Santa Maria Novella. One is in the Isabella Stewart Gardner Museum in Boston (Death and Assumption of the Virgin) whilst the rest are in the Museo nazionale di San Marco in Florence.
