= Armadio degli Argenti =

Italian paintings

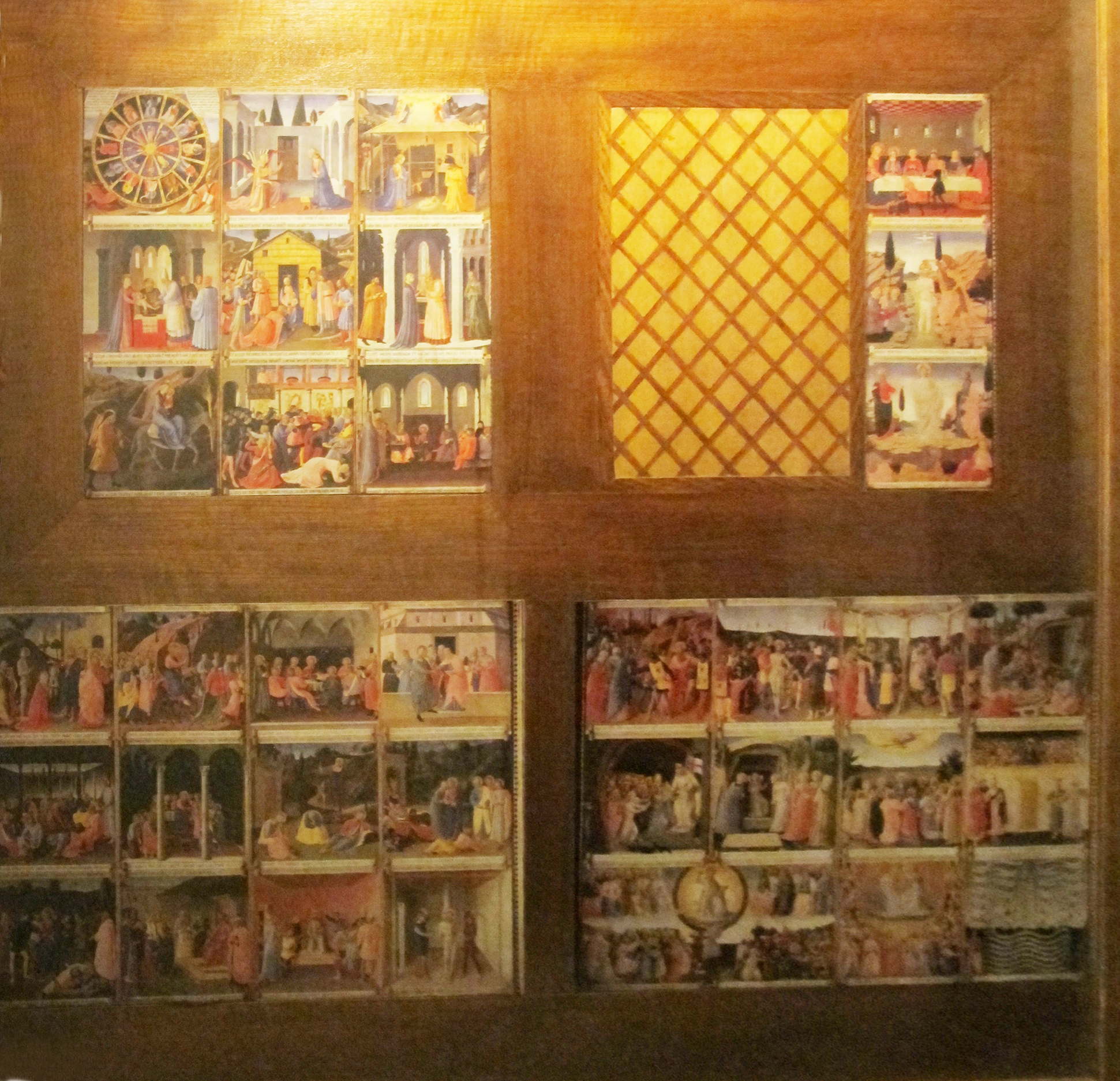
- Artist: Fra Angelico
- Year: 1451–1453
- Medium: tempera on panel
- Location: Museo nazionale di San Marco, Florence

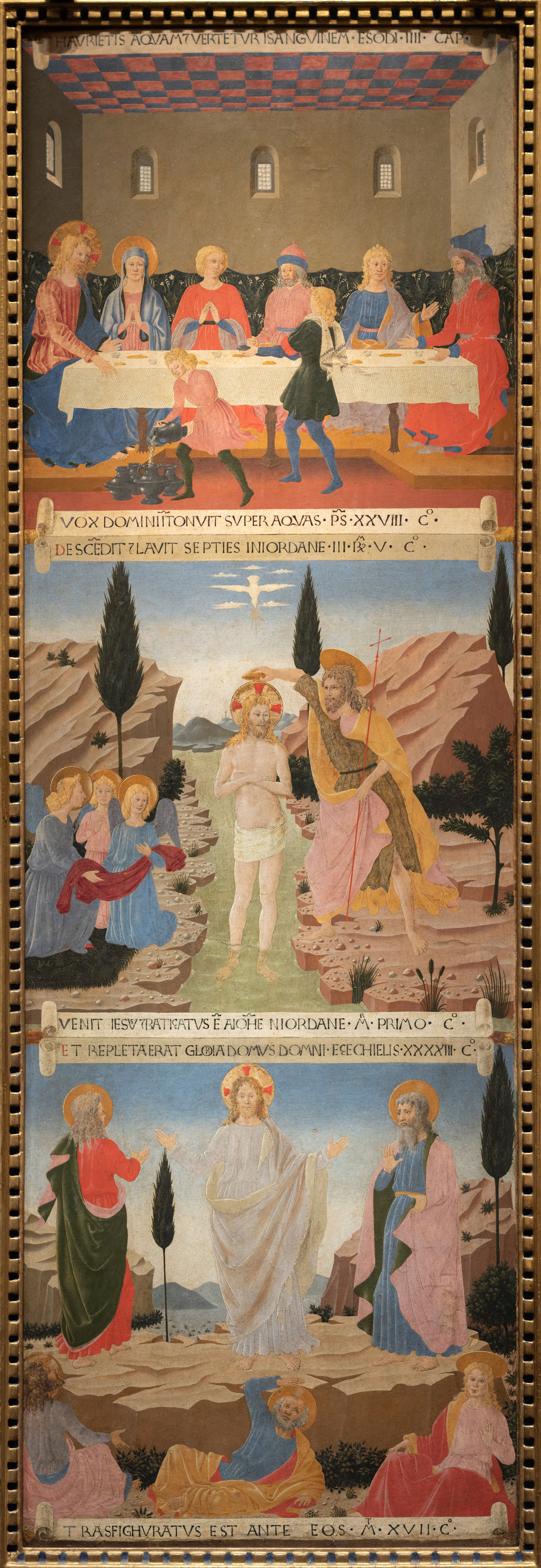
Wedding at Cana, Baptism and Transfiguration

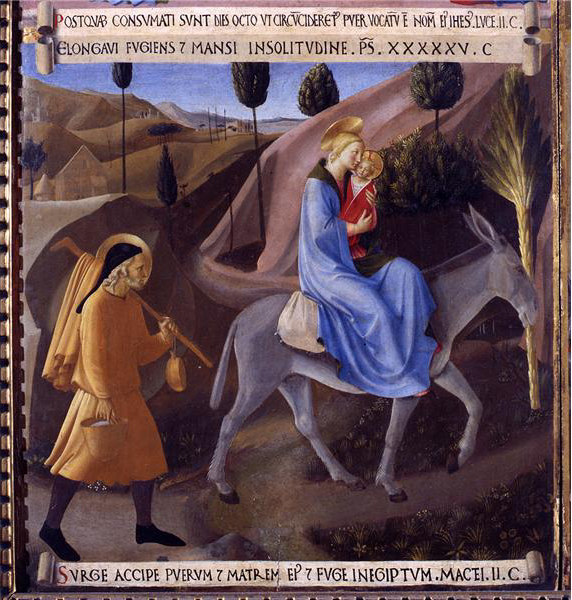
Fra Angelico, Flight into Egypt

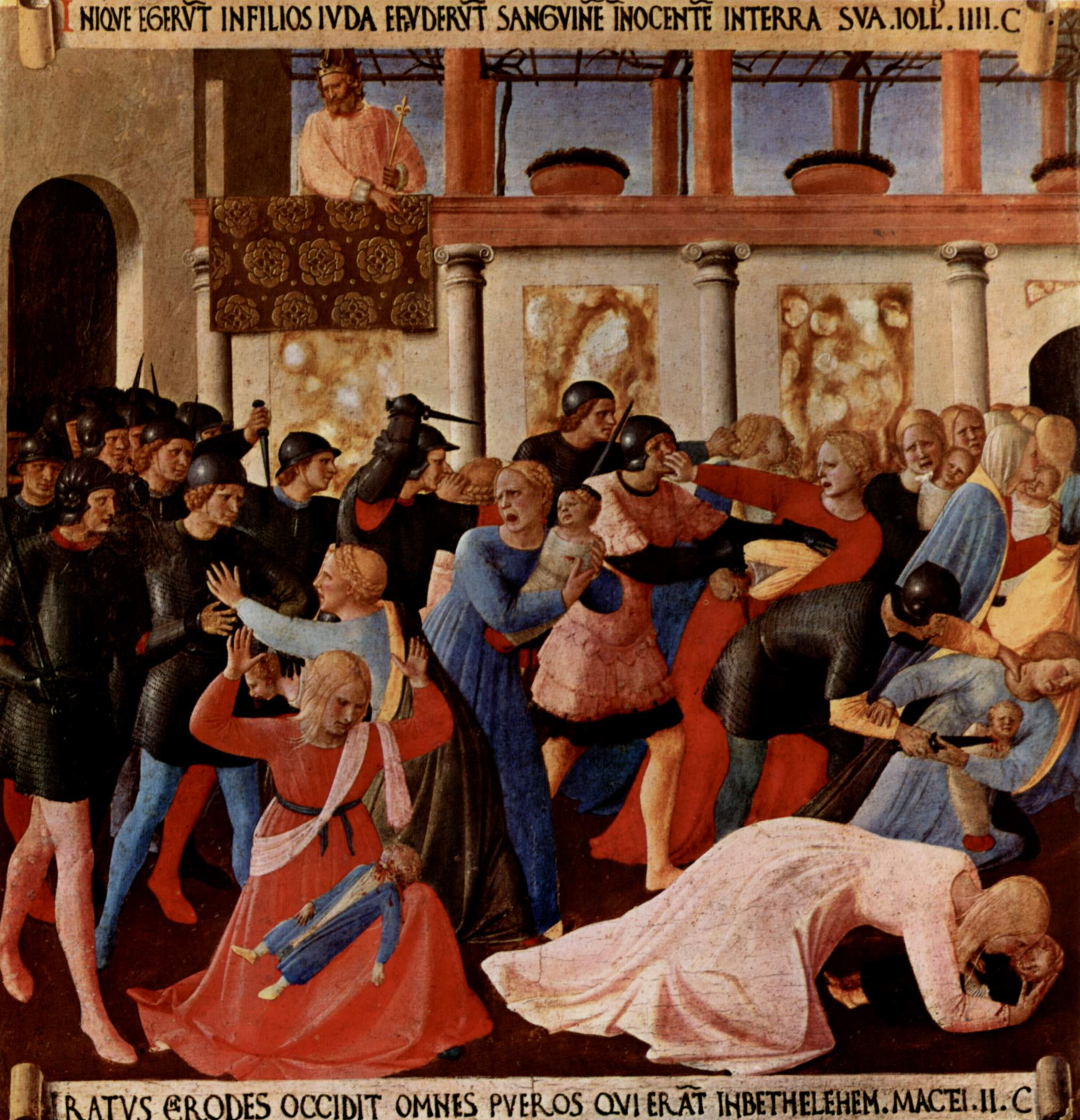
Fra Angelico, Massacre of the Innocents

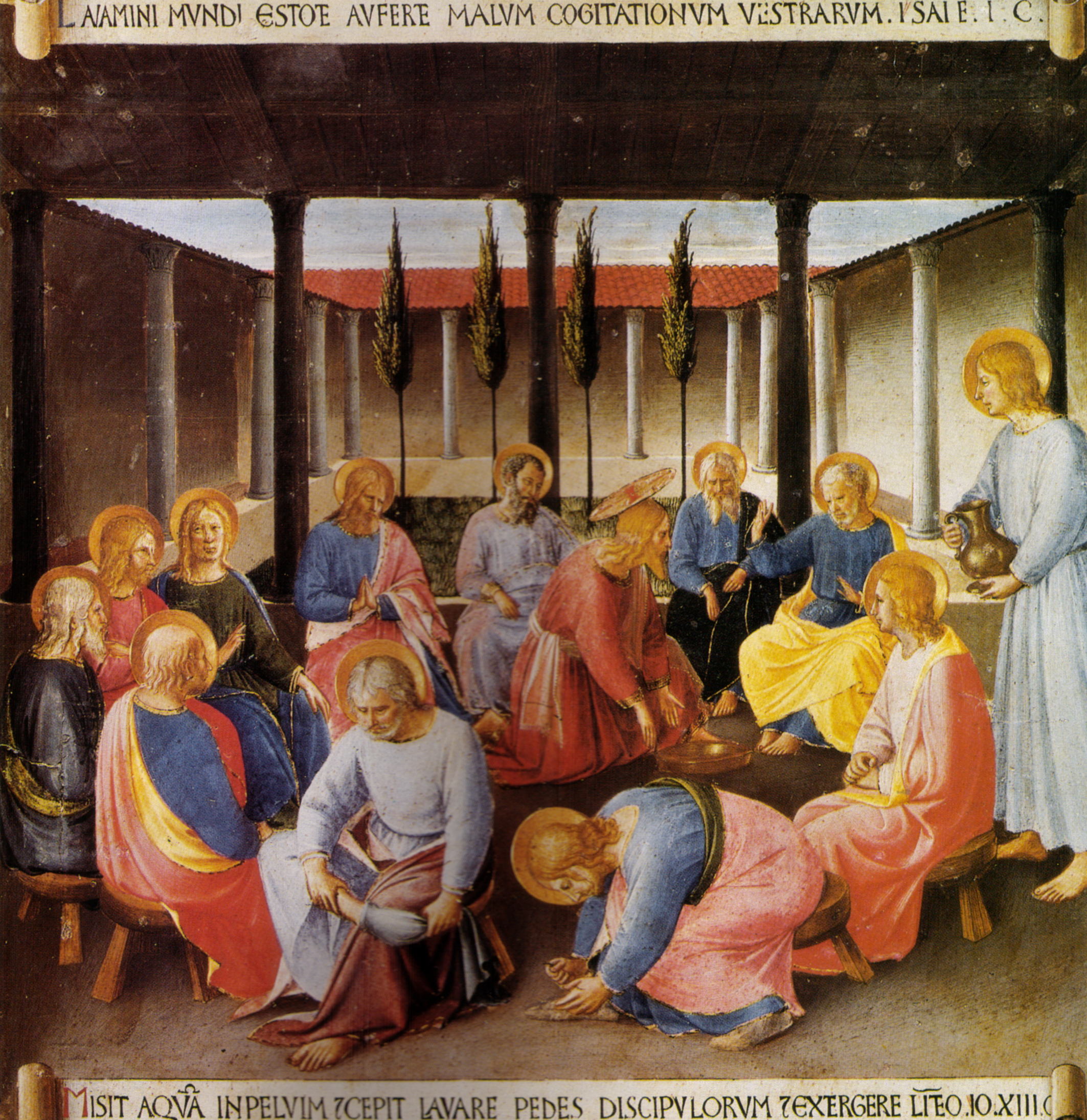
From drawings by Fra Angelico, Christ Washing the Disciples' Feet

The panels of the Armadio degli Argenti (Italian: Wardrobe of the Silversmiths) are a series of tempera paintings on panel created by Fra Angelico ca. 1451–1453 and completed later by other hands using his preparatory drawings. They are now in the Museo nazionale di San Marco in Florence.

== History ==
The Armadio was designed as an ex voto door for Santissima Annunziata. According to a passage in the chronicle of Benedetto Dei, they were commissioned from Fra Angelico's studio by Piero de' Medici. The commission formed part of Piero's wider plan to create a family oratory between the 'Vergine Annunziata' chapel and the convent's library, in which the Armadio was intended to be displayed. The oratory was roofed in 1451, so the interior decoration could not pre-date that year. The last payment for the Armadio was made in 1453. A source from the same year shows how the Armadio was already in the oratory by that date, referring to a window as being located above it.

The original arrangement of the panels is unknown, though they are thought to have originally formed two doors. In the rebuilding of the oratory between 1461 and 1463, when Piero built two rooms for his stays with the monks, they were probably rearranged into a kind of 'saracinesca' mechanically operated from above. At that point technical works were entrusted to Donatello and Lapo Portigiani. In January 1461 there is record of a payment to a Pietro del Massaio, painter, which was described as intent on "teaching to paint the armadio", probably in adding colour to the designs produced by Fra Angelico himself, who had died six years earlier. The colour in some of the last scenes differ from Fra Angelico's usual palette, with more yellow for example.

After 1460 Fra Domenico da Corella recorded the panels in his Theocoton as works by Fra Angelico. All the later historic sources (Albertini, Billi, Anonimo Gaddiano) ascribe the entire work to Fra Angelico. The one exception is Manetti, who speaks of "almost" all the tabernacle as being an autograph work by Fra Angelico. Vasari attributed the whole work to Fra Angelico, but argued it was produced in his youth, a conclusion also followed by all 19th-century art historians. Modern art historians place it instead at the end of the artist's life, proposing collaborators for the non-autograph panels such as Domenico di Michelino (Berenson), the Master of Cell 2 (Pope-Hennessy), Zanobi Strozzi and Benozzo Gozzoli (Salmi). The autograph panels include Annunciation, Nativity, Flight into Egypt and Massacre of the Innocents.

== List of subjects ==
The cycle represents Christ's childhood, preaching, passion, death and resurrection:

1. Ezekiel's Vision
2. Annunciation
3. Nativity
4. Circumcision
5. Adoration of the Magi
6. Presentation of Christ in the Temple
7. Flight into Egypt
8. Massacre of the Innocents
9. The Christ Child in the Temple
10. Wedding at Cana
11. Baptism of Christ
12. Transfiguraiton
13. Resurrection of Lazarus
14. Entry into Jerusalem
15. Last Supper
16. Judas Receiving Thirty Pieces of Silver
17. Washing the Disciples' Feet
18. Communion of the Apostles
19. Gethsemane
20. Judas Kisses Christ
21. Arrest of Christ
22. Christ Before Pilate
23. Christ Mocked
24. Flagellation
25. The Road to Calvary
26. Christ Disrobed
27. Crucifixion
28. Christ Placed in the Tomb
29. Descent into Limbo
30. The Maries at the Tomb
31. Ascension
32. Pentecost
33. Last Judgement (double panel)
34. Coronation of the Virgin
35. Genealogy of Christ
