= Museo Nazionale di San Marco =

Former convent and art museum in Florence

Coordinates: 43.778198°N 11.259329°E

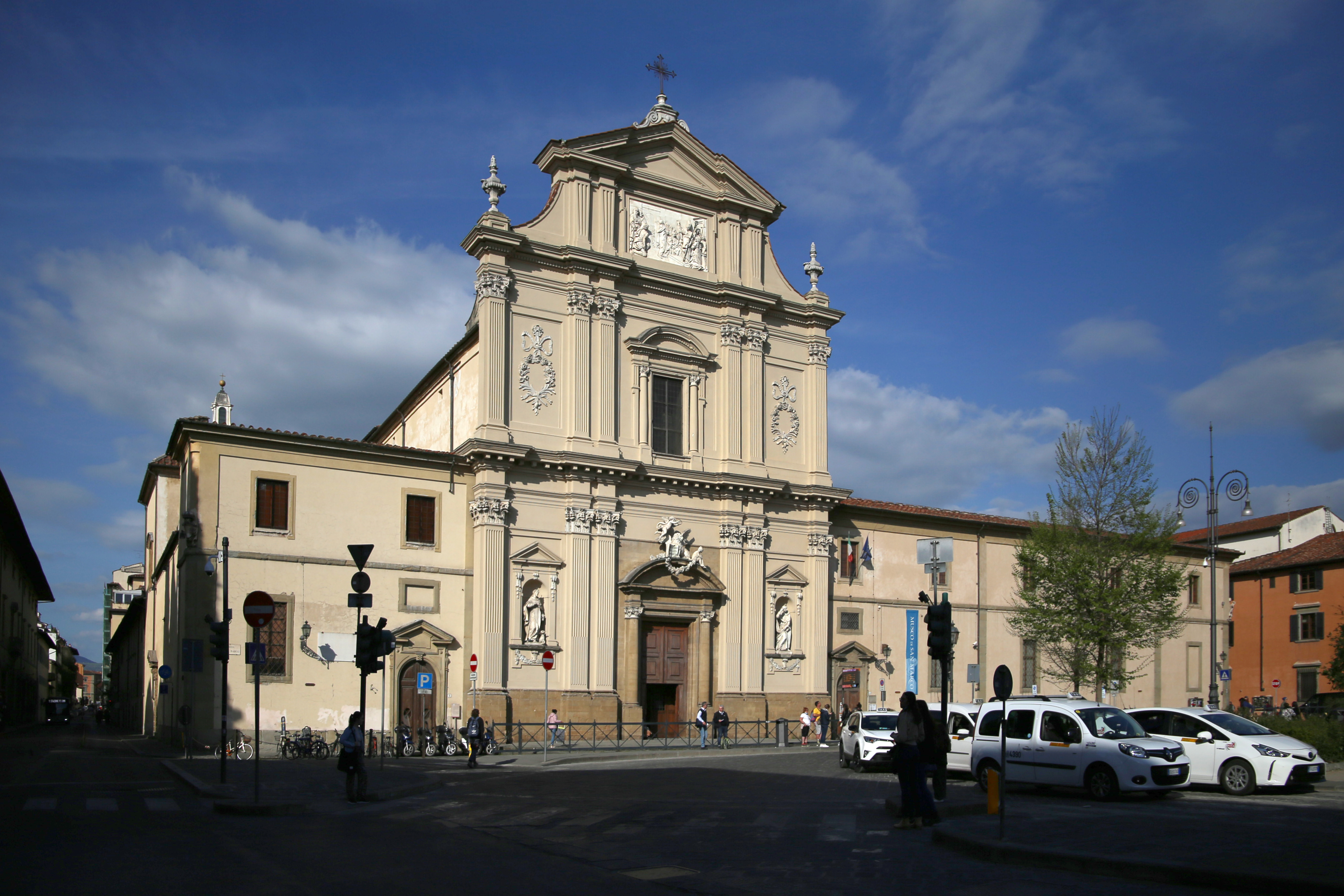
- Established: 1869
- Location: Piazza San Marco 3, 50121 Florence, Italy
- Type: Art museum, historic site
- Website: Official website

Museo Nazionale di San Marco is an art museum housed in the monumental section of the medieval Dominican convent of San Marco dedicated to St Mark, situated on the present-day Piazza San Marco, in Florence, a region of Tuscany, Italy.

The museum, a masterpiece in its own right by the fifteenth-century architect Michelozzo, is a building of first historical importance for the city and contains the most extensive collection in the world of the works of Fra Angelico, who spent several years of his life there as a member of the Dominican community. The works are both paintings on wood and frescoes. The museum also contains other works by artists such as Fra Bartolomeo, Domenico Ghirlandaio, Alesso Baldovinetti, Jacopo Vignali, Bernardino Poccetti and Giovanni Antonio Sogliani.

San Marco is known as the seat of Girolamo Savonarola's discourses during his short spiritual rule in Florence in the late 15th century. Also housed at the convent is a famous collection of manuscripts in a library built by Michelozzo.

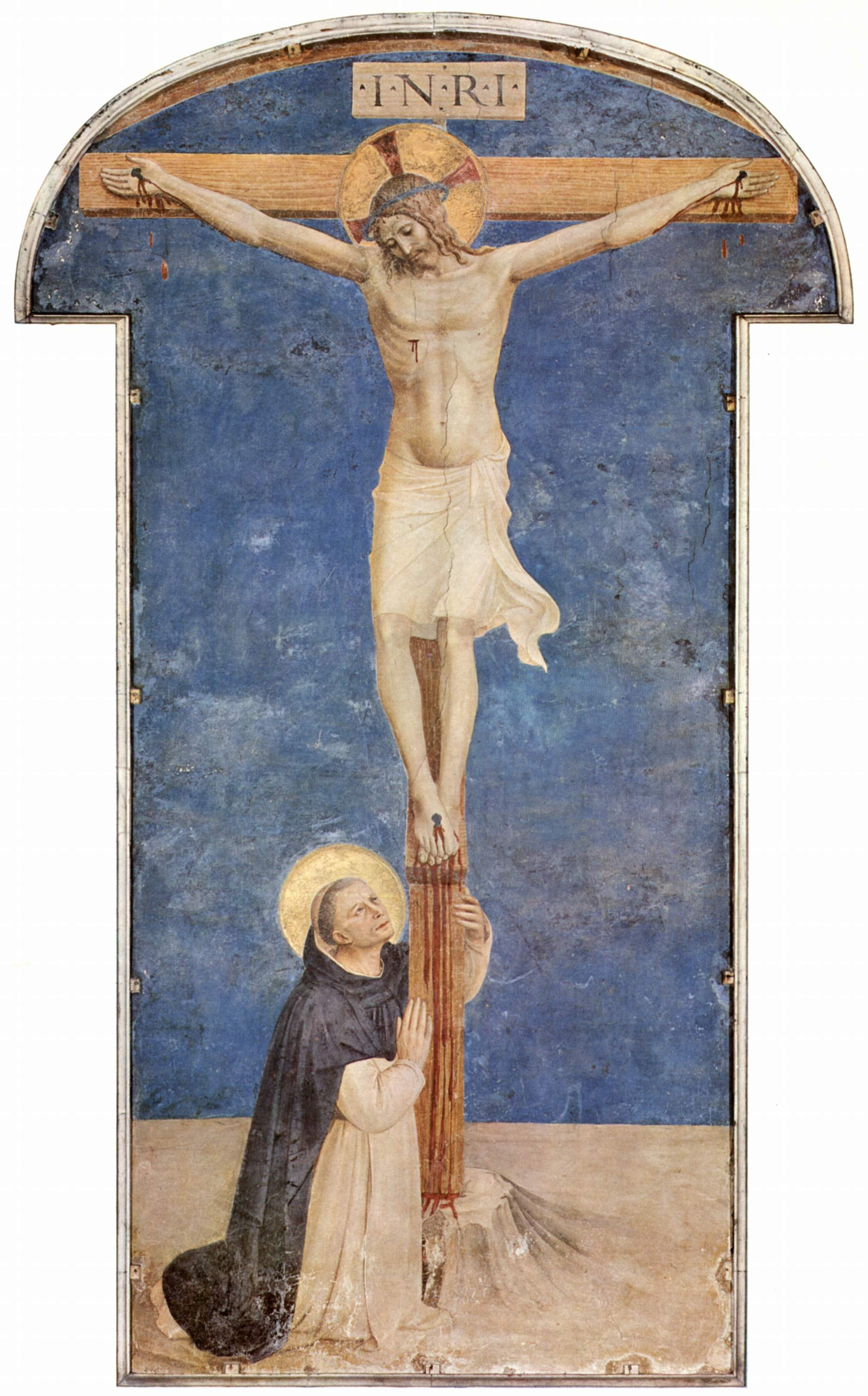
Saint Dominic Adoring the Crucifixion, a fresco by Fra Angelico

== The building ==
The museum is situated in the oldest part of the monastery, which occupies about half the total space. The building has expanded over time, now taking up a whole block, and part of it is still occupied by friars today. The oldest section of the building, built over the medieval Sylvestrian monastery, was constructed by the architect Michelozzo at the specific request of Cosimo il Vecchio de' Medici and his expense, to house the reformed Dominicans of Fiesole, an order at that time led by Antonino Pierozzi, the later Antoninus of Florence. Over about ten years (1436–1446) Michelozzo completed an extremely modern and functional monasterial building project which contributed to the glorification of Medicean patronage. Michelozzo made use of the pre-existent wall structures of the Sylvestrian monastery complex which date back to the end of 13th century. Michelozzo ably linked together the ground floor rooms around a harmoniously proportionated cloister and raised the levels of these buildings to create the dormitories on the first floor with a large number of cells to suit an expanding monastery.

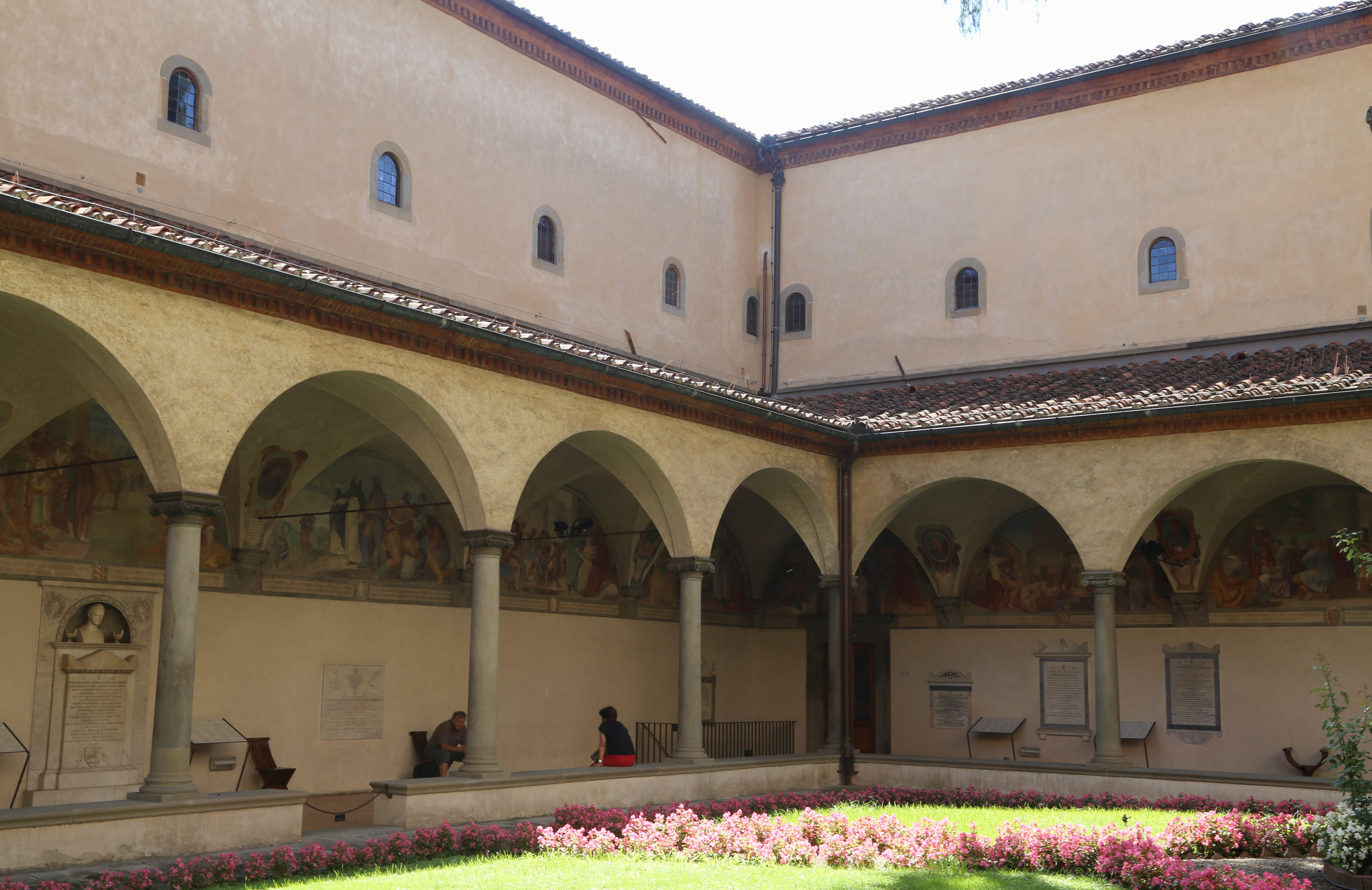
Sant'Antonino Cloister

== Sant'Antonino Cloister ==
The cloister is behind the church and it introduces the visitor to the sight of the splendidly poised architecture of the monastery, a typical example of a measured and orderly Florentine Renaissance architecture. The sight of Saint Dominic Adoring the Crucifixion, painted by Fra Angelico opposite the entrance is uplifting. Originally this was the only painted image decorating the white cloister. The appearance of the cloister was changed during the 17th century, when the monks of San Marco decided to celebrate St. Antonino by commissioning the most famous Florentine painters of the time to paint a cycle of lunettes depicting Scenes from the life of St. Antonino.

== Pilgrims' Hospice ==
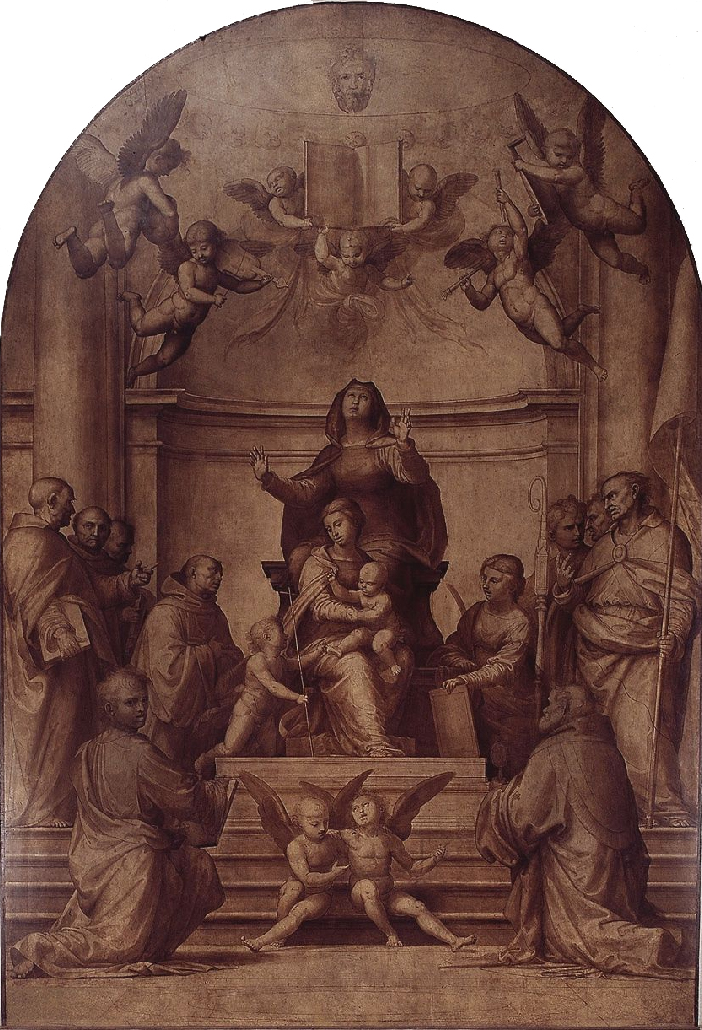
Sacra conversazione by Fra Bartolomeo

The large room, which can be entered from the right side of the cloister, occupies all the part of the building onto Piazza San Marco and already existed in the Middle Ages when the monastery was inhabited by the Sylvestrian monks. When the monastery was rebuilt in the 15th century, Michelozzo covered the whole area with cross vaults and raised the building to construct the second friars' dormitory. Inside there was also a Pilgrims' Hospice, alluded to in the fresco painted by Fra Angelico on the second door, Christ the pilgrim welcomed by Dominicans. Today it is the home of almost all of Angelico's panel painting, coming from the churches and monasteries of Florence.

== "Lavabo" Room and Fra Bartolomeo Room ==
This room, known as the "Lavabo" Room due to the ancient function for which it was originally equipped, is also accessible from the cloister and is in front of the Large Refectory, next to the kitchen. Monastery rules imposed the ritual washing and purification of the hands before eating. Above the entrance door is a badly deteriorated fresco by Fra Angelico depicting Christ in Pietà, alluding to the Resurrection awaiting those who nourished by him. Today the room contains works presenting the artistic activity of the second great painter who lived in San Marco at the beginning of the 16th century: Fra Bartolomeo. He kept a painting studio in San Marco until his death in 1517. Basing his work on the preliminaries of rational 15th century classicism, Fra Bartolomeo developed a style of art which was freer in its use of colour space and design and inspired the young Raphael. Another door into a room used in the past as the monastery's kitchen, located in an area containing all of the service rooms, in the vicinity of the "Spesa" Cloister. Today it contains an important collection of painting by Fra Bartolomeo.

== Chapterhouse ==
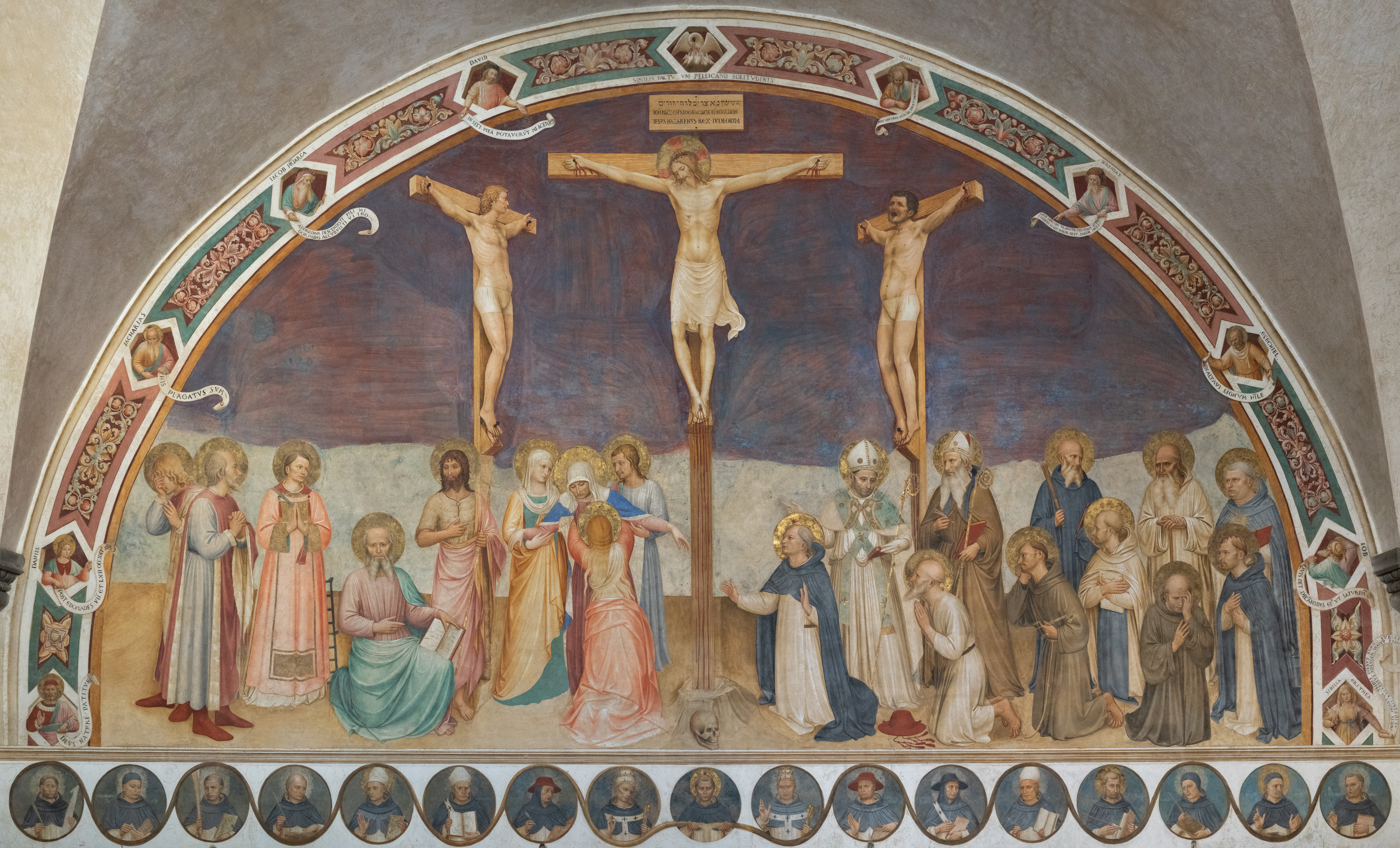
Crucifixion with Saints by Fra Angelico

The external appearance, with exposed stone walls and a doorway flanked by large windows, reveals that it belongs to the 14th century part of the monastery. The room is dominated by Fra Angelico's large Crucifixion. This fresco has a rather unreal appearance, which is also due to the state of repair of the background, originally painted blue and now grey and red, because the pigment has fallen and it can be seen in its preparatory state, As if in a collective reflection on the event of the Crucifixion, there appear in the painting not only historical figures but also the founders of the religious orders.

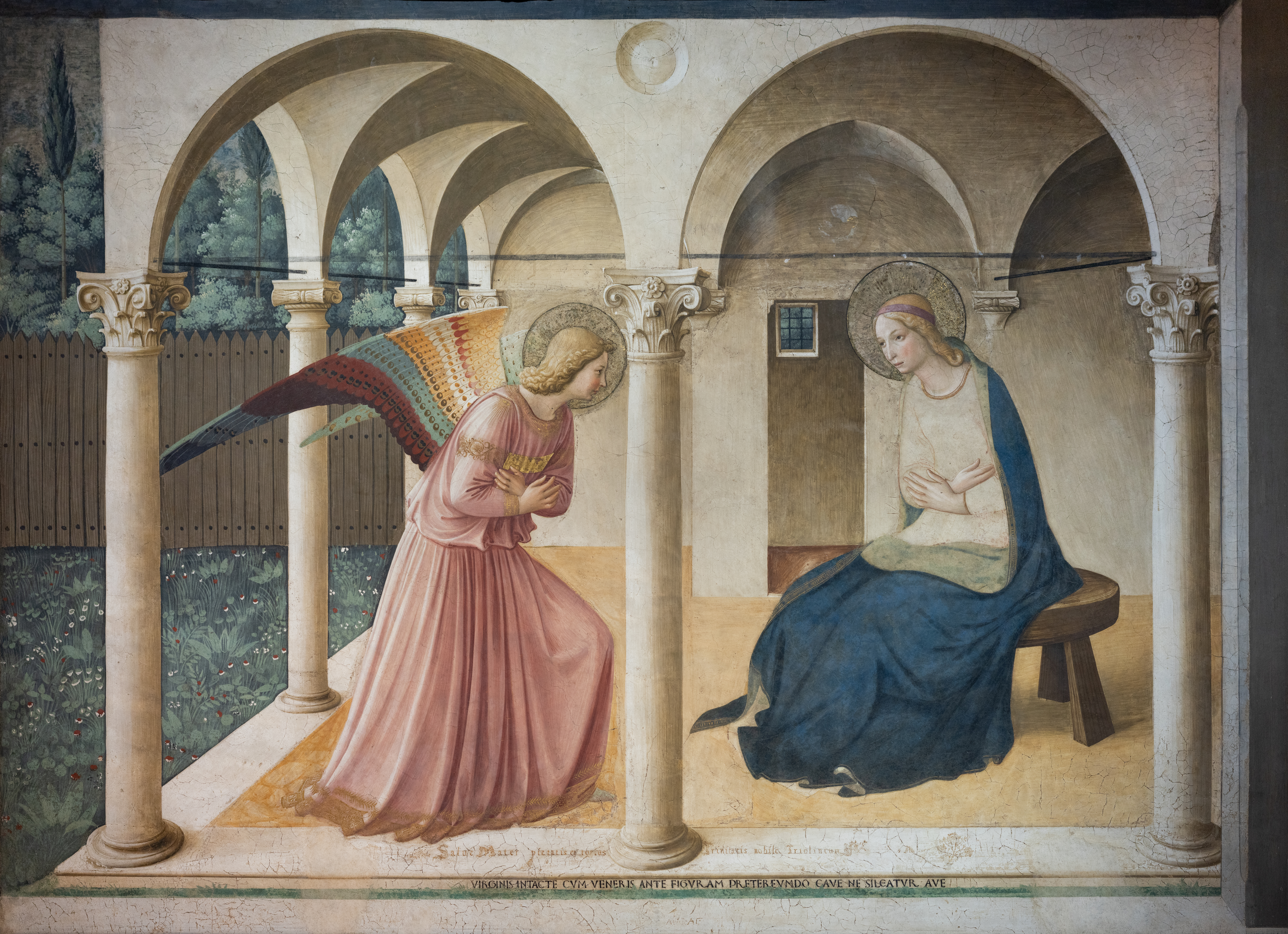
Annunciation by Fra Angelico, north corridor

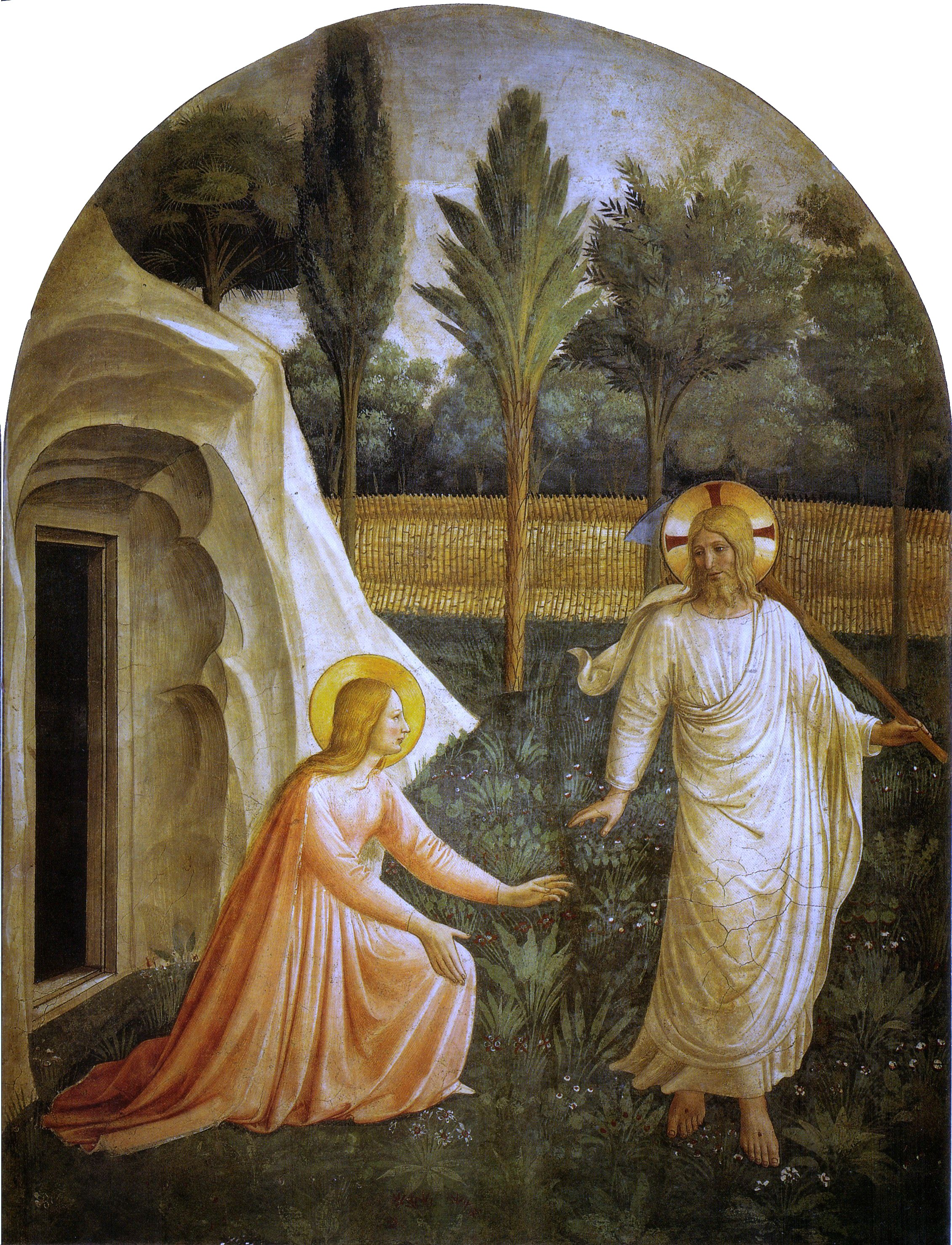
Noli me tangere by Fra Angelico (cell 1)

== First Floor Dormitories ==
On the upper floor are the friars' dormitories. They consist of three corridors surrounding the cloister on three sides which is overlooked by 44 cells frescoed by Fra Angelico between 1439 and 1443. The Annunciation is one of the three frescoes painted outside the cells by Fra Angelico (along with Saint Dominic Adoring the Crucifixion and the Sacra Conversazione known as Virgin of the Shadows) before which the friars recited a common prayer at the times and in the ways prescribed by the Dominican Rule. In each cell is a fresco concerning the life and passion of Christ, for the exclusive contemplation of the friar occupying the cell. This cycle of frescoes, unique in the world, is considered to be completely the work of Fra Angelico, although he was helped by assistants.

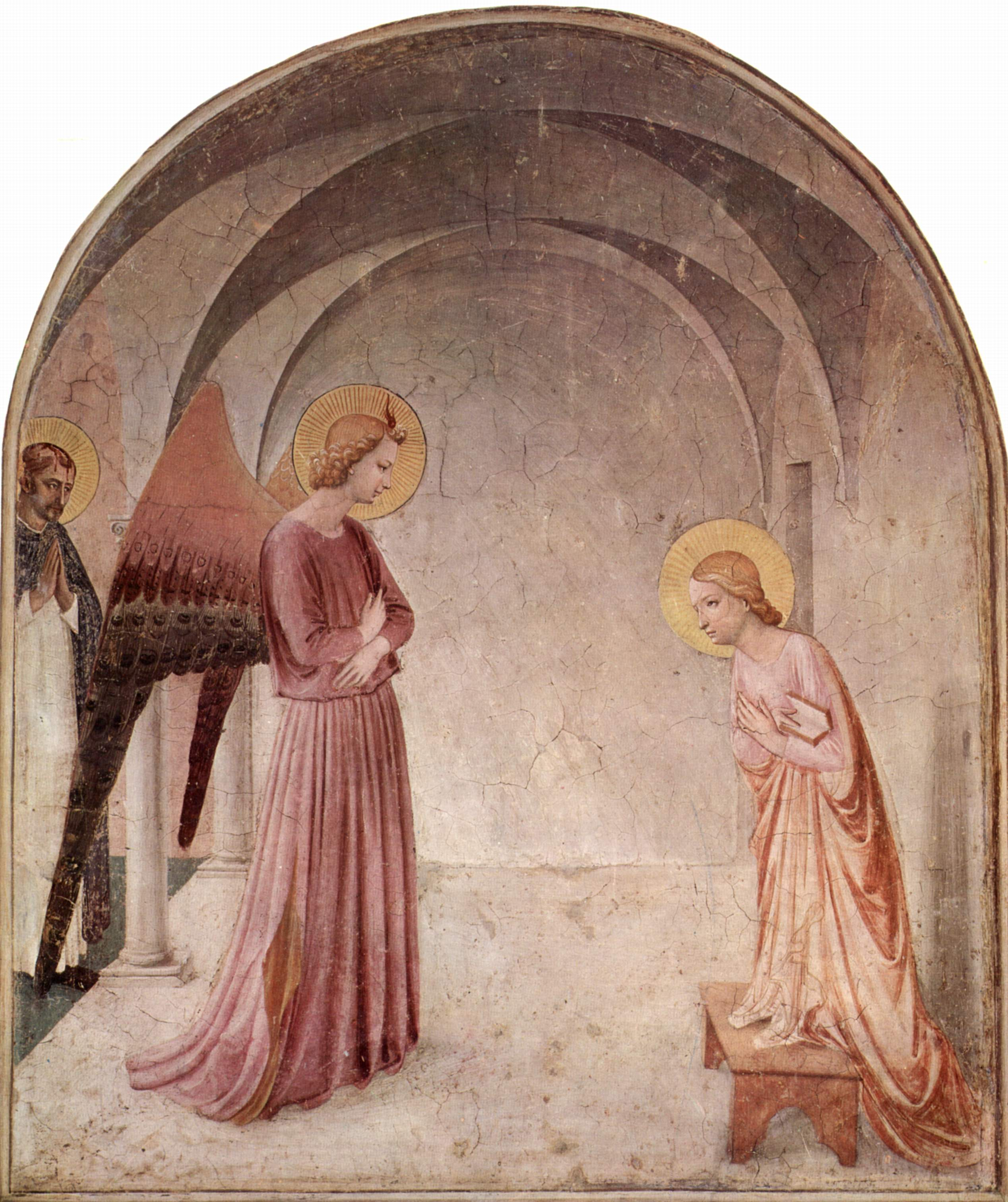
Annunciation by Fra Angelico (cell 3)

First Corridors Cells To the left of the Annunciation is the Fathers' Corridor, the first built by Michelozzo to house the Dominican friars who had just settled into the monastery. In 1437 the first twenty cells had already been completed, arranged on both sides of the corridor and soon after were frescoed by Fra Angelico. On the left side are the frescoes painted entirely by Fra Angelico, while those on the right were designed by the Master but painted in great part by faithful assistants.

Novices’ Corridor This Dormitory, reserved for Novices, was built some time after the Dormitory of the Fathers and adjacent to it, as can be seen in the facade looking onto the cloister, in addition to three rooms at the end of the corridor, formerly designated as wardrobes before becoming the quarters occupied by Fra Girolamo Savonarola near the end of the 15th century.

The cells, larger in size than those of the Fathers to allow the Novices to become gradually accustomed to a reduction in their personal space, all contain frescoes of the same subject, Saint Dominic Adoring the Crucifixion. The only difference in the frescoes is the attitude of the kneeling Saint, shown in the various modes of prayer indicated by St. Dominic himself.

In the last two cells before ascending to the so-called Prior's Quarters, some relics of Savonarola are displayed, such as the cloak and the devotional cross.

Third Corridor Cells This frescoes in the cells of the Third Corridor, the one designated also to lay brothers and guest, at the end of which are the two cells reserved for Cosimo de' Medici, where Pope Eugenius IV slept the night of Epiphany 1443 when he came to consecrate the new church, differ in some respects from the others. The language is more descriptive and the colours are brighter, the composition is more complex and next to the Master the contribution of his assistants increases.

== Library ==
Cosimo, who also financed the realization of the liturgical books for the church, illuminated by Zanobi Strozzi, a close collaborator of Fra Angelico, provided the necessary volumes, purchasing the extensive book collection of the humanist Niccolò Niccoli 1441, which abounded in classical, Greek and Latin texts. The library, the first to be opened to the public in the Renaissance, was arranged by Vespasiano da Bisticci according to the dictates of Tommaso Sarzana, who later became Pope Nicholas V. Medieval and Renaissance illuminated choir-books coming also from other churches and monasteries were instead placed here, where they are now exhibited in rotation.

From its founding, the nature of the library at San Marco was determined by the decision of Cosimo de' Medici and Niccoli's trustees to establish the collection of bibliophile humanist there. The library of San Marco represents the humanist ideal of the Florentines: a collection not established for one person, but for general use. The library was equally dedicated to religious and secular texts. When the library was opened in 1444, there were over 400 volumes on 64 benches. However, Cosimo was unsatisfied with that number and he took action to supplement the original collection with other codices, especially those in traditional fields of study.

The library was built by Michelozzo on the first floor, spacious with two rows of stone columns which form three naves covered in barrel vaulting. The large number of windows fill the room with natural light for study and for the copying of manuscripts. Under Lorenzo il Magnifico the library became one of the favourite meeting points for Florentine humanists such as Agnolo Poliziano and Giovanni Pico della Mirandola who could conveniently consult the precious book collections assembled by the Medici. Both are among the significant figures buried in San Marco. Pope Nicholas V was involved with the library before and after he assumed the papal throne. He was the author of a book list recommended for the library during its planning stage. Later, as the Pope, he wrote recommendations for those seeking access to the library.

Stripped of the plutei (balustrades) with which it was originally furnished and the wall cupboards which replaced them in the 17th century, the library's bare architecture is revealed. Recent restoration has revealed both the original 15th-century colour scheme, green imitation marble, uncovered "as sample" in a central bay where fragments of a Wind Rose have also been discovered, and some frescoes of architectural illusionism around the doors, probably painted by Iacopo Chiavistelli at the time of the 17th-century renovation of this room.

== Small Refectory ==
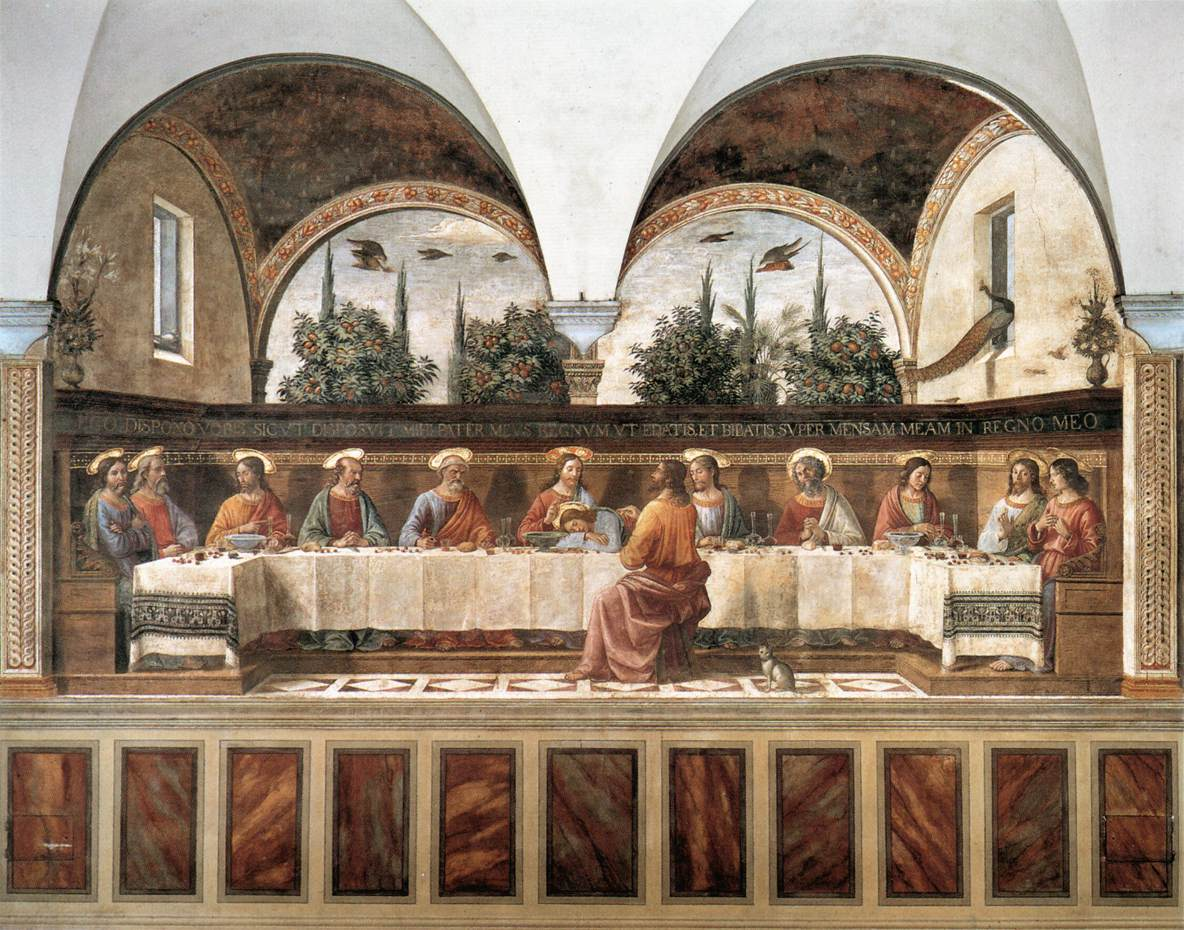
Last Supper by Domenico Ghirlandaio

A small room once used as a Refectory for monastery guests staying in the adjoining guest Lodge. It may also have been used as the refectory for sick monks being treated in the infirmary, from the 17th century situated inside the Lodge. It was frescoed by Ghirlandaio only about forty years after the construction of the monastery and today contains some glazed terracotta relief works from the Della Robbia studio, dated a little later than the Last Supper.

== Museum ==
Like many establishments of its kind throughout Europe, the Dominican convent was seized by the civil authorities during the upheavals stemming from the French Revolution and the expansion of the Napoleonic Empire. San Marco met this fate in 1808, returned to Dominican hands after the fall of Napoleon, but then was confiscated in large part by a decree of the nascent Kingdom of Italy dated 7 July 1866 and became State property. This left to the Dominicans the church, the rooms opening on to the Saint Dominic cloister and the area that came much later to house the library containing over 10,000 books specializing in spirituality, founded in 1979 thanks to the bequest of the Catholic scholar Arrigo Levasti (1886–1973) and named after him.

In 1869, having been declared a national historical monument, the greater part of the complex reopened as a museum, following repairs and some adjustments to meet the new situation. It was in this period that the frescoes by Fra Angelico were restored by the artist Gaetano Bianchi. In 1906, the museum was chosen to house the remains of architectural value surviving from the buildings demolished by the urban planning measures of the previous century. This led to the creation of a distinct Museo di Firenze antica ("Museum of Old Florence"). In 1922 the museum managed to add to its collections a large number of works of Fra Angelico, having them transferred from the Uffizi Gallery or the Galleria dell'Accademia, an arrangement that has since remained unchanged.

== Gallery ==
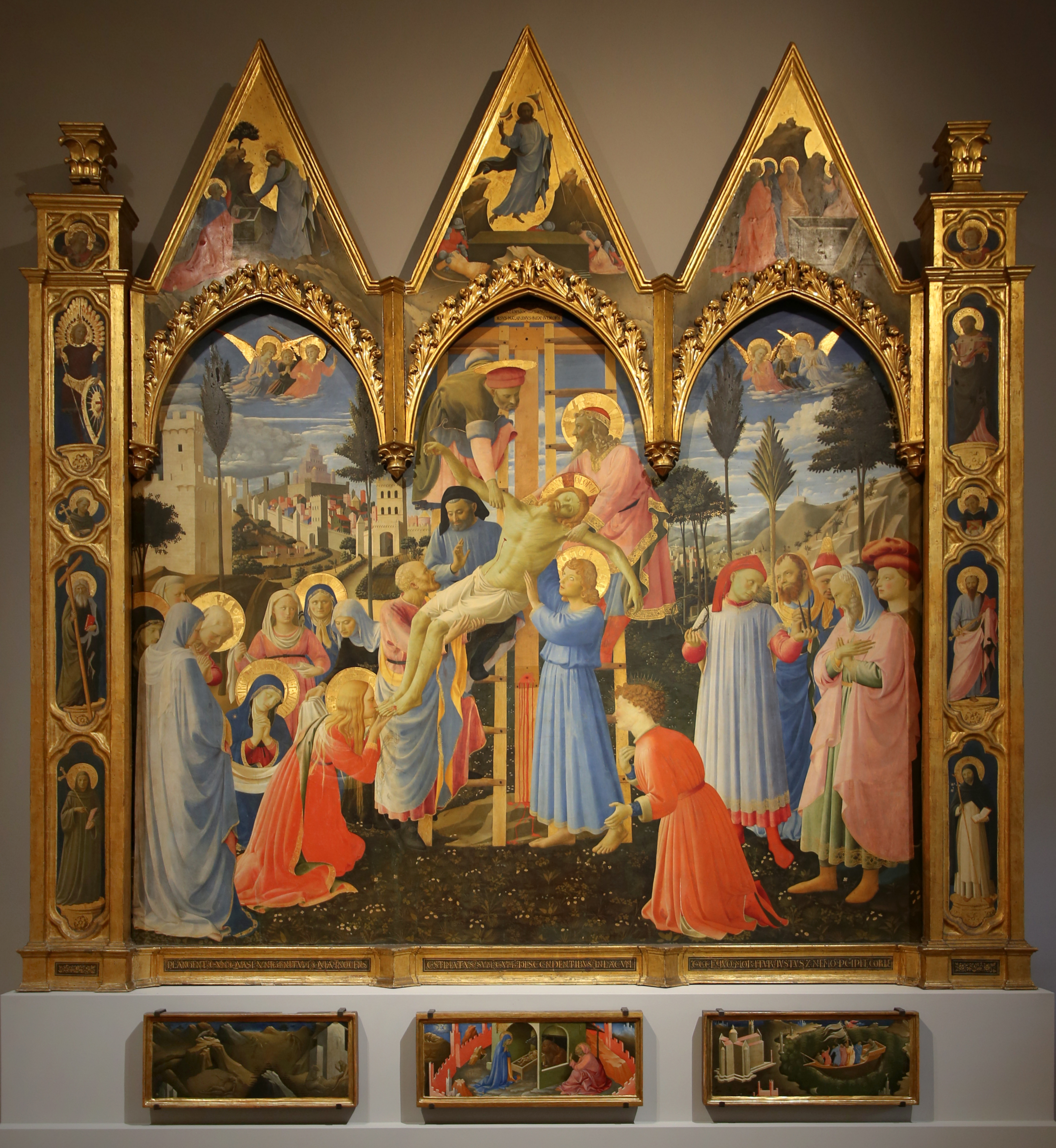
Fra Angelico, Deposition of Christ

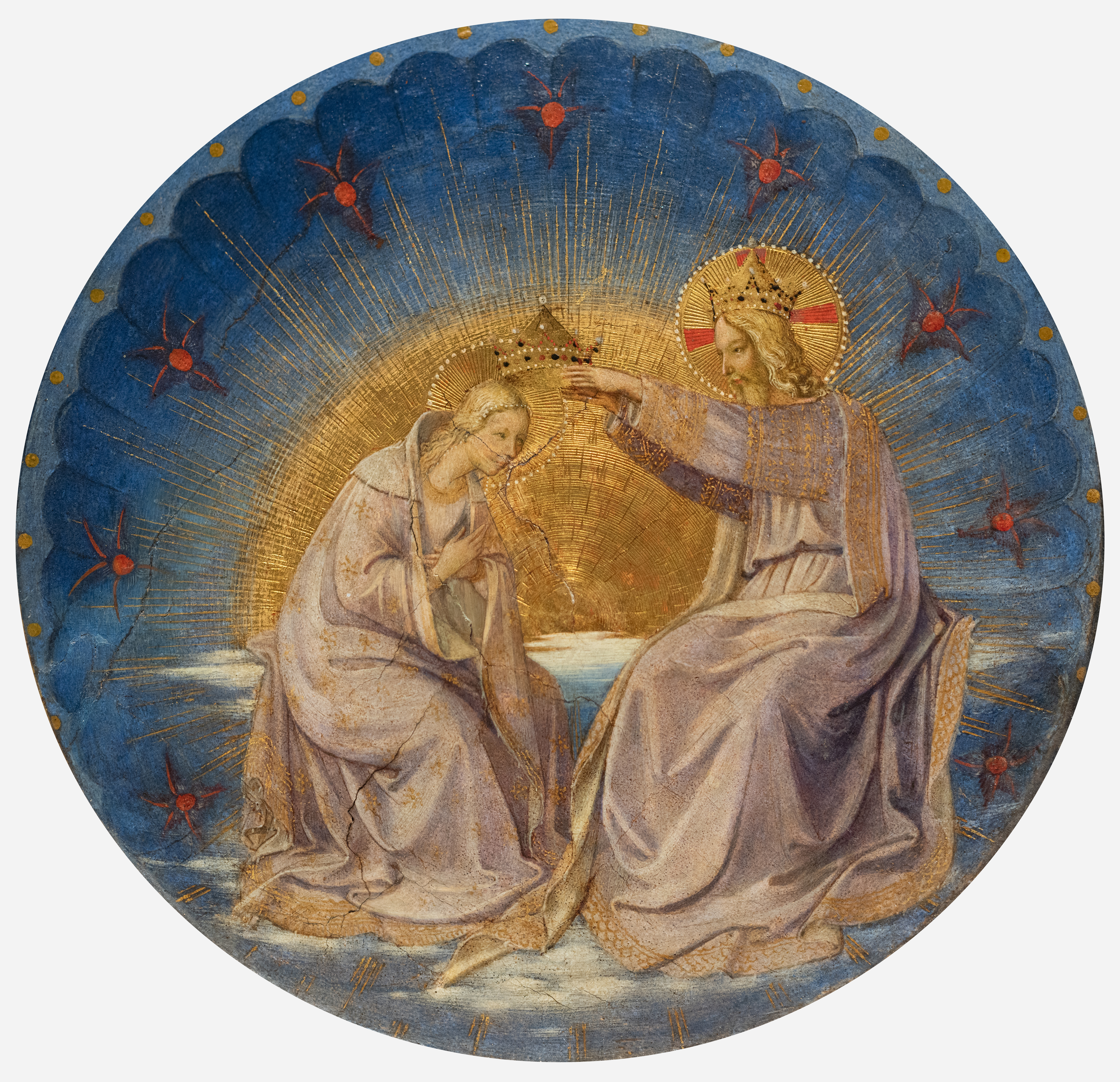
Roundel of the Crucifixion and the Coronation of the Virgin by Angelico

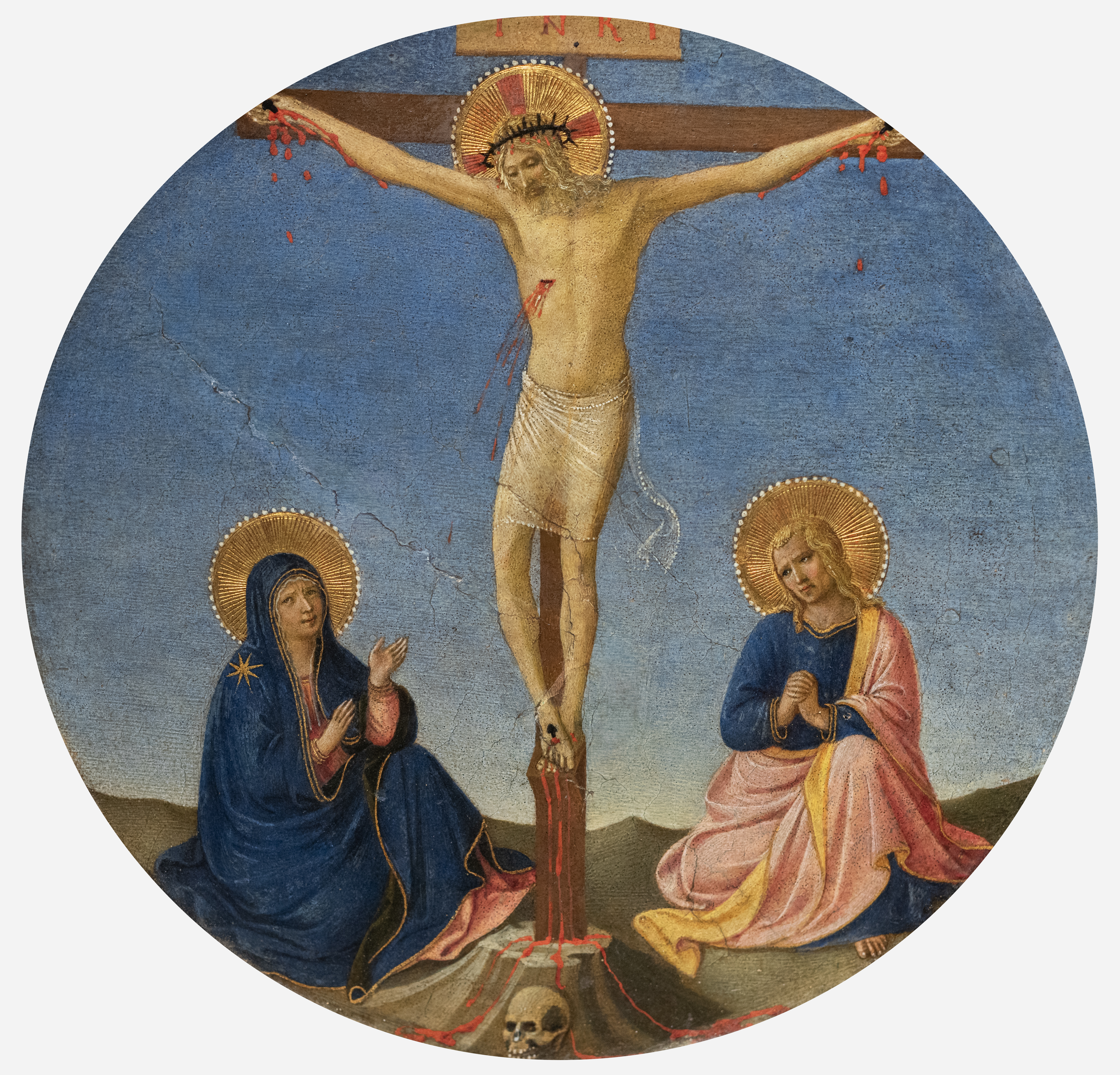
Roundel of the Crucifixion and the Coronation of the Virgin by Angelico

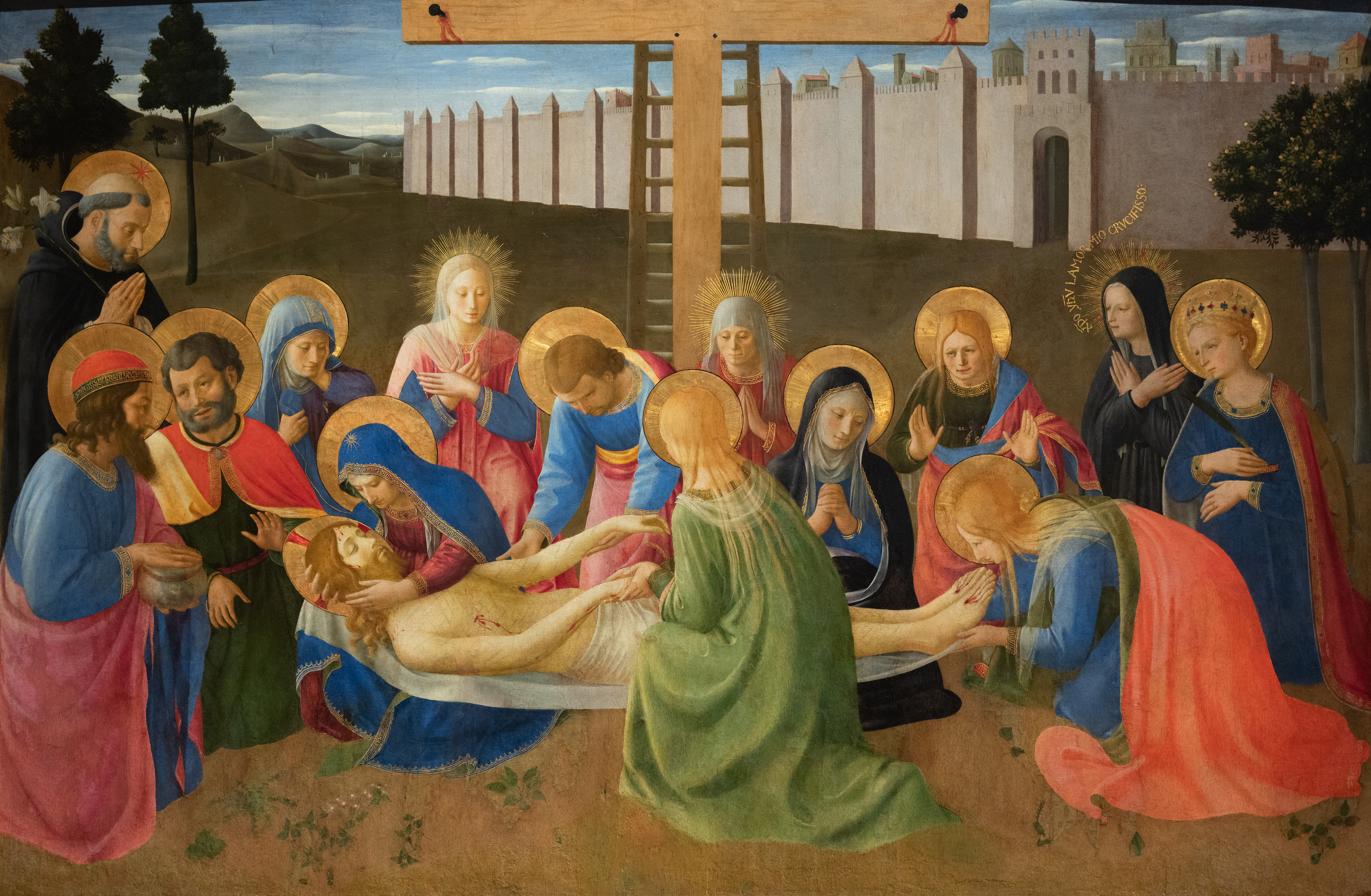
Fra Angelico – Lamentation over dead Christ

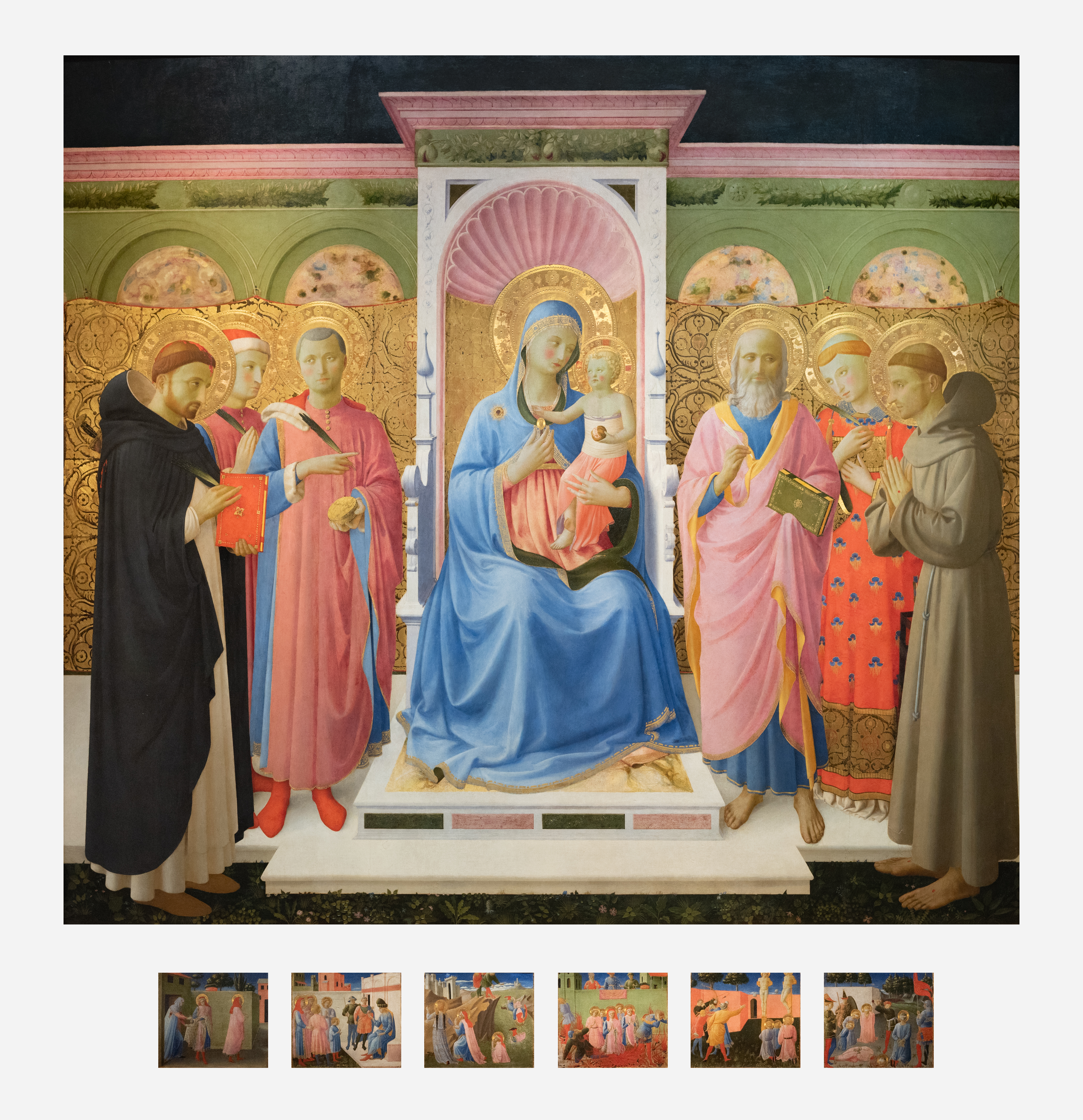
Fra Angelico – Annalena Altarpiece

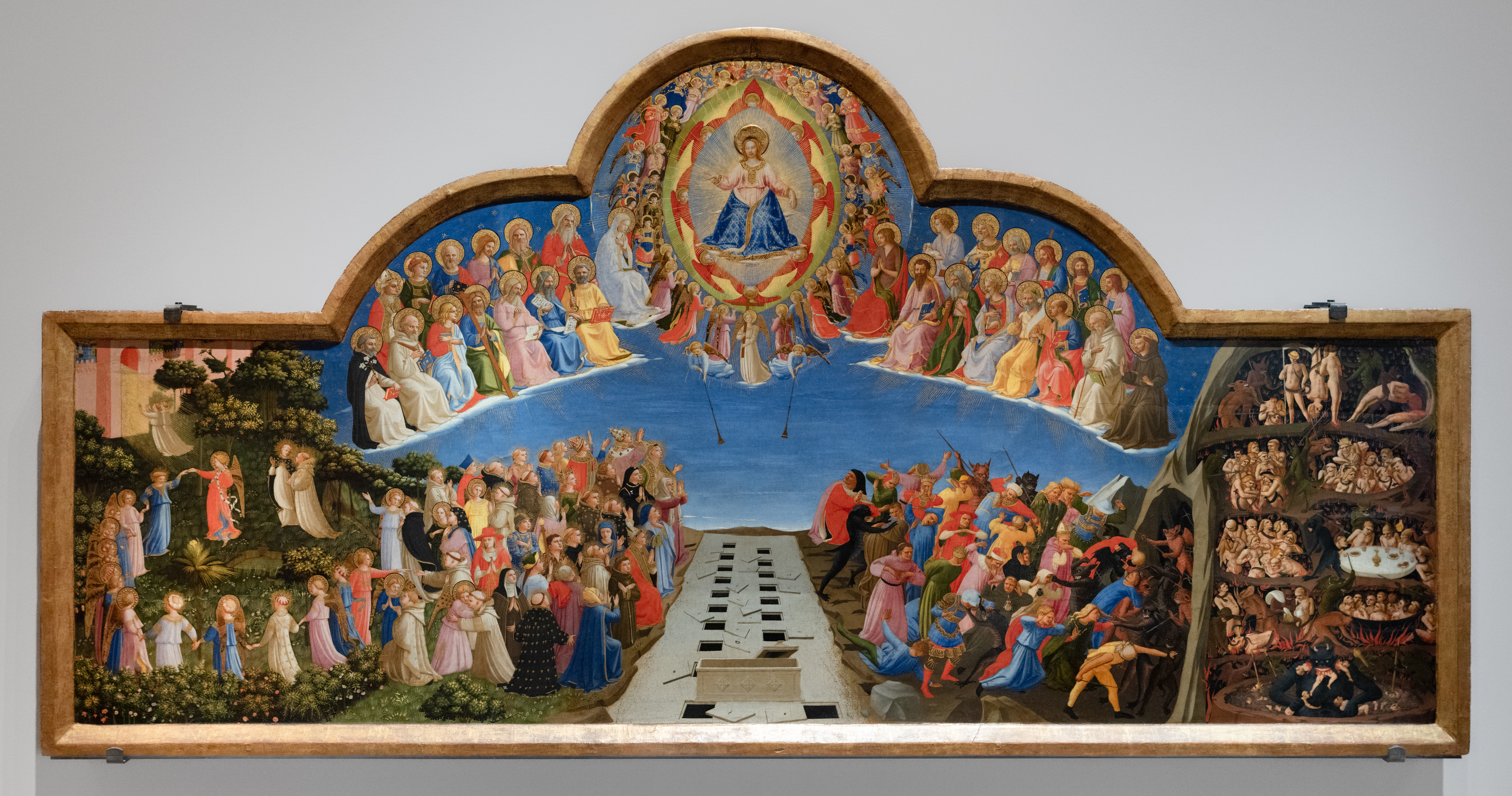
Fra Angelico – The Last Judgement

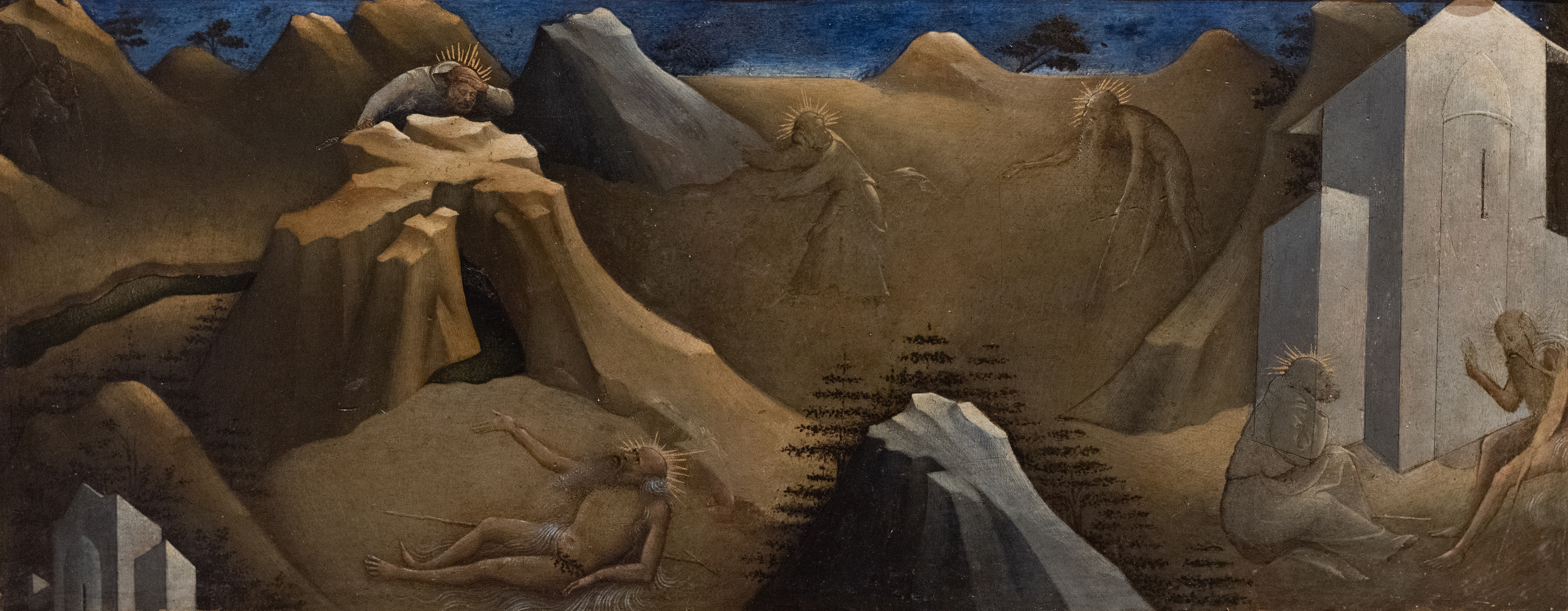
Lorenzo Monaco – Deposition of Christ predella, Paphnutius of Thebes

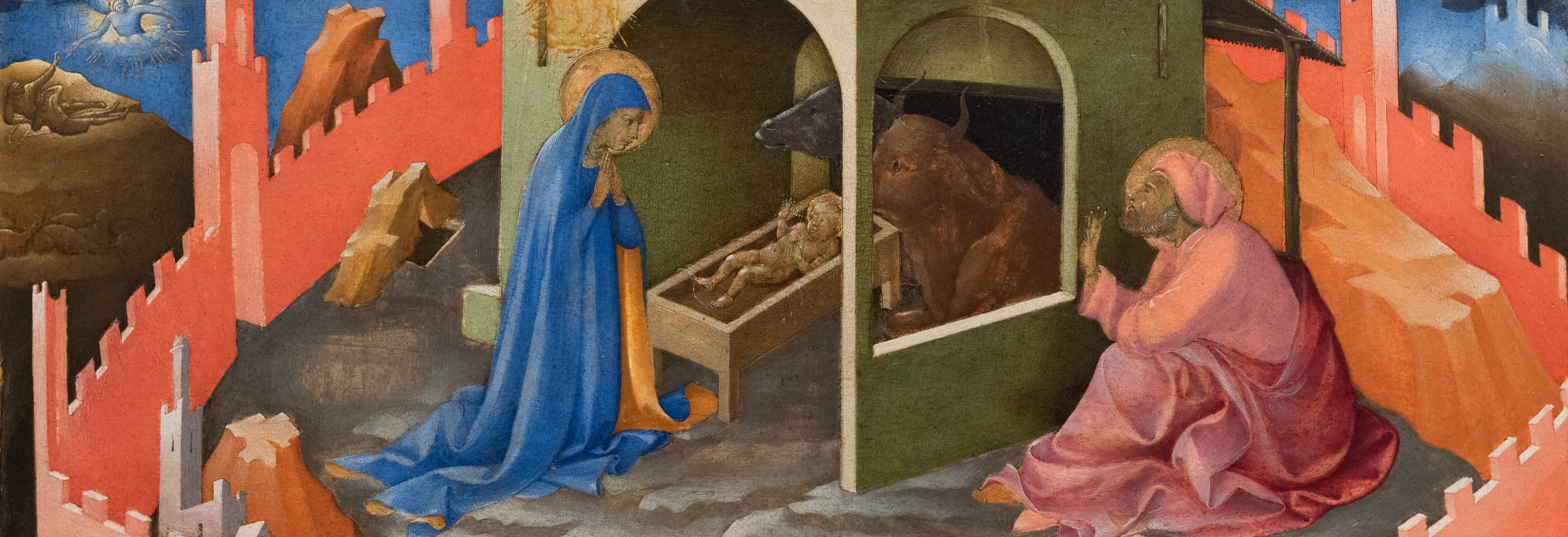
Lorenzo Monaco – Deposition of Christ predella – Nativity

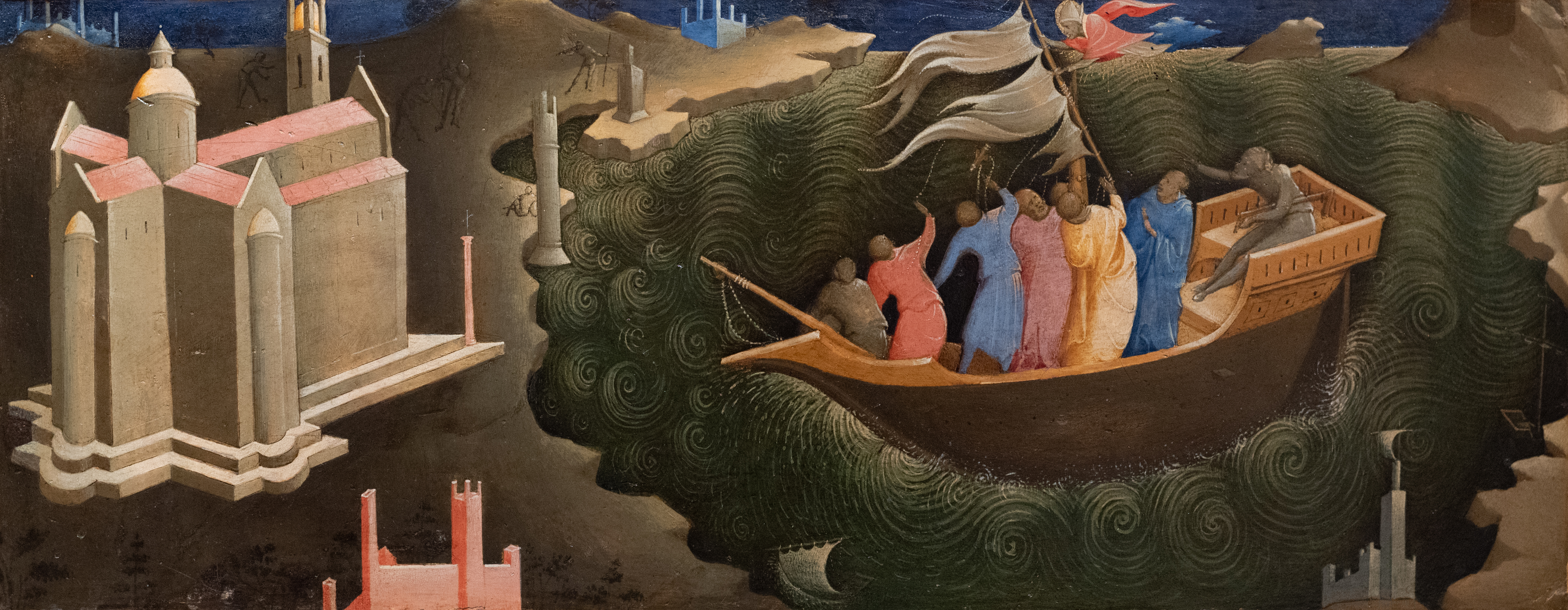
Lorenzo Monaco – Deposition of Christ predella, St. Nicholas of Myra Calming the Storm

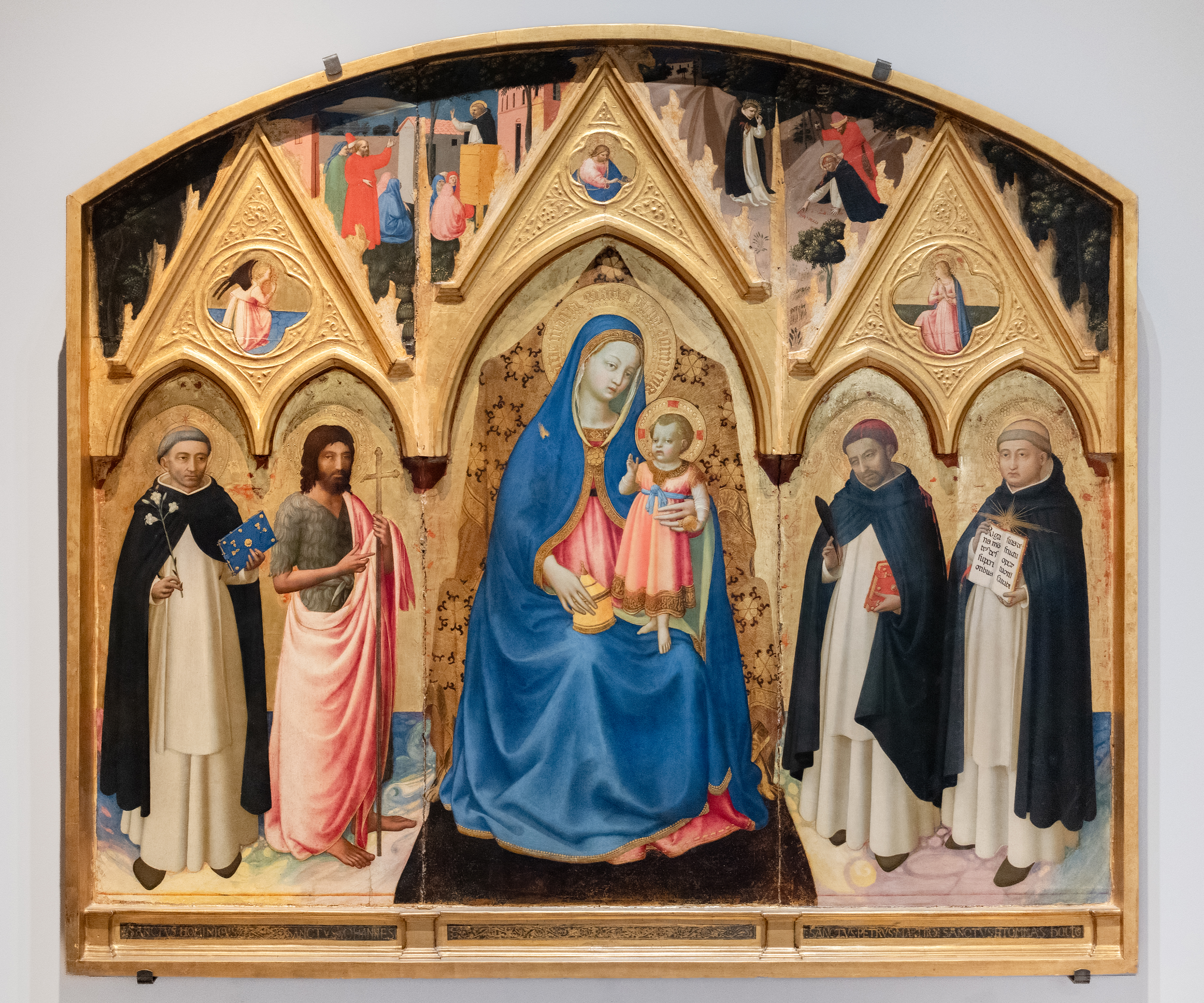
Fra Angelico, San Pietro Martire Triptych

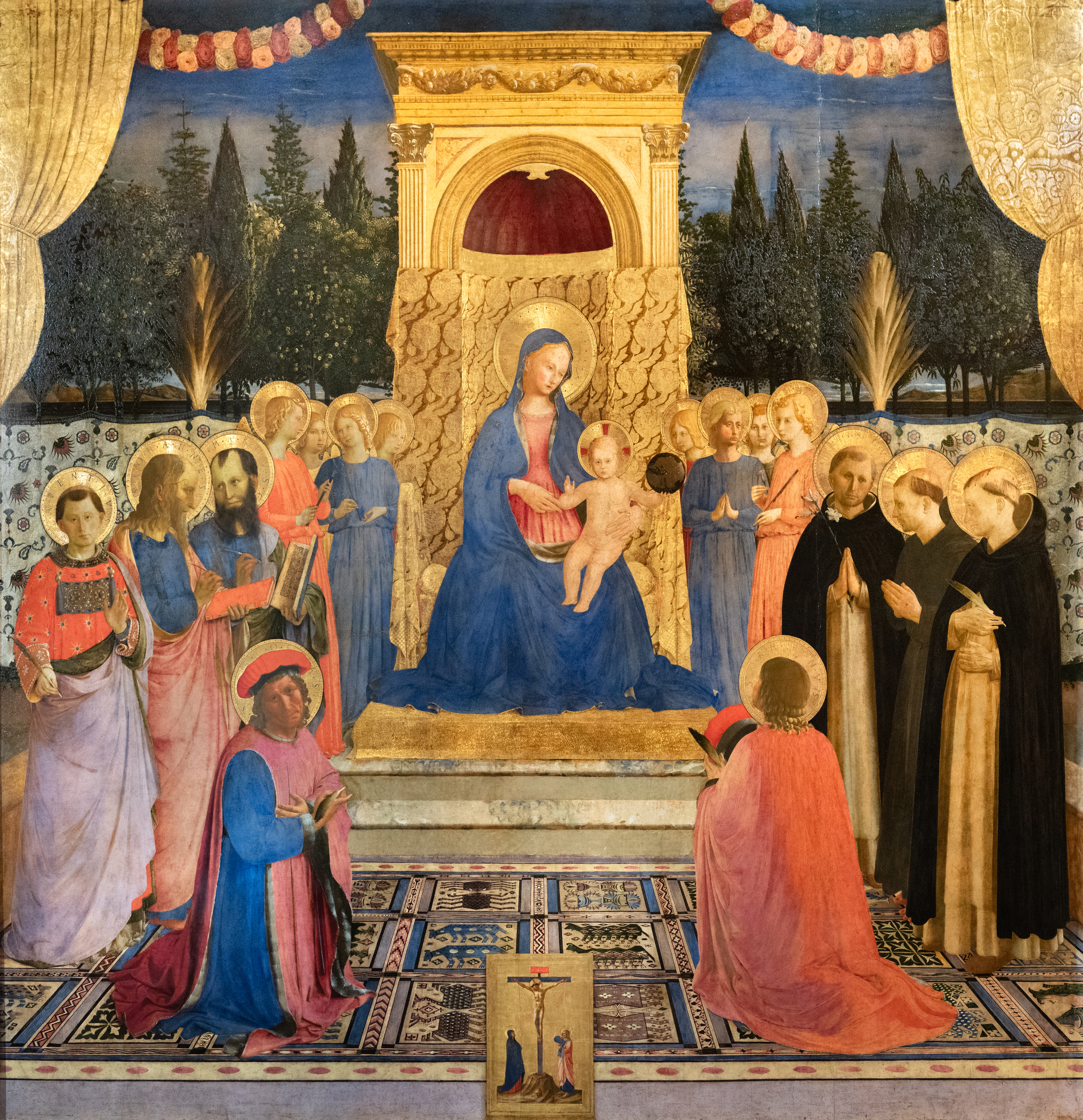
Fra Angelico, San Marco Altarpiece

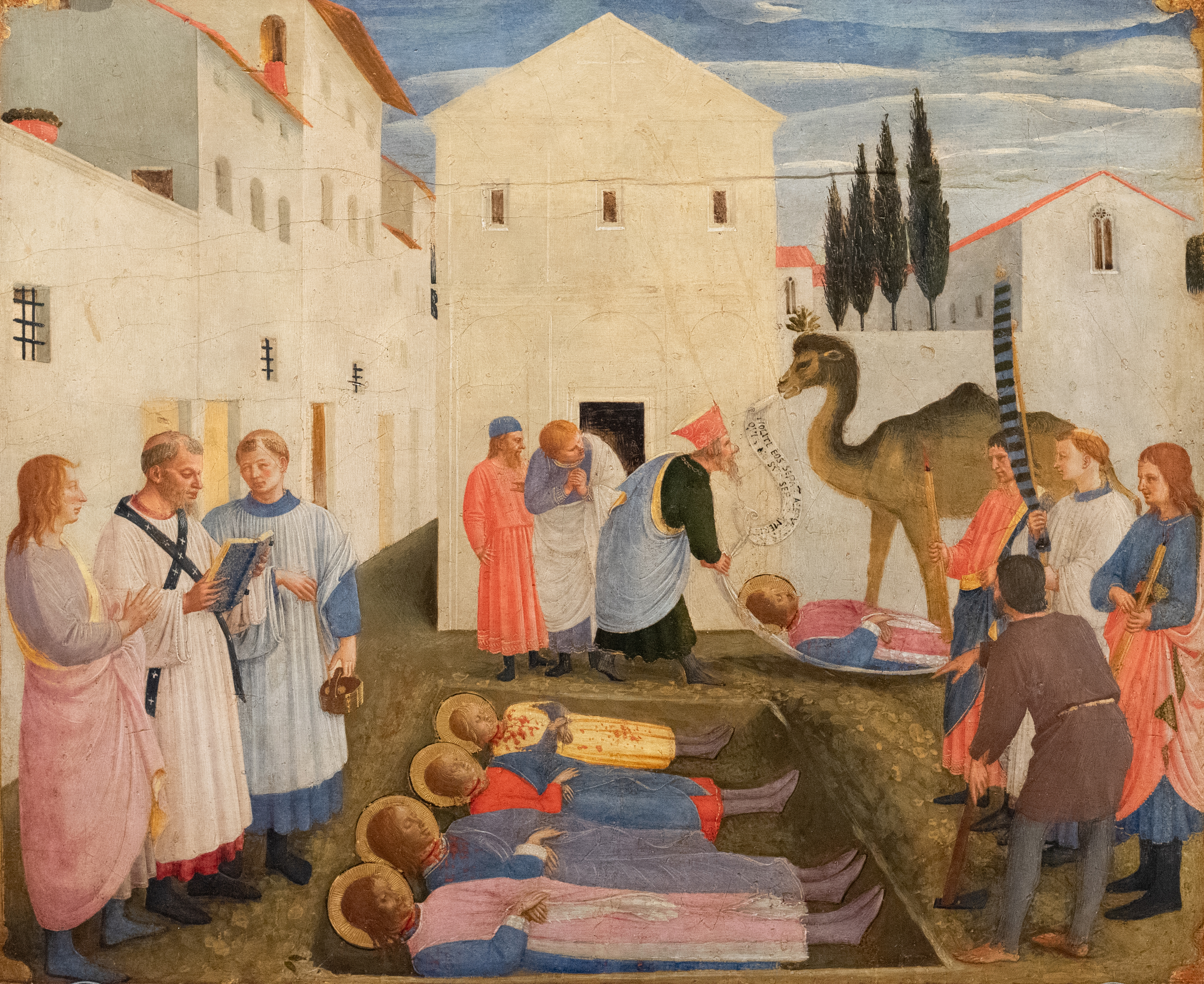
Fra Angelico, The Burial of Saints Cosmas and Damian (San Marco Altarpiece predella)

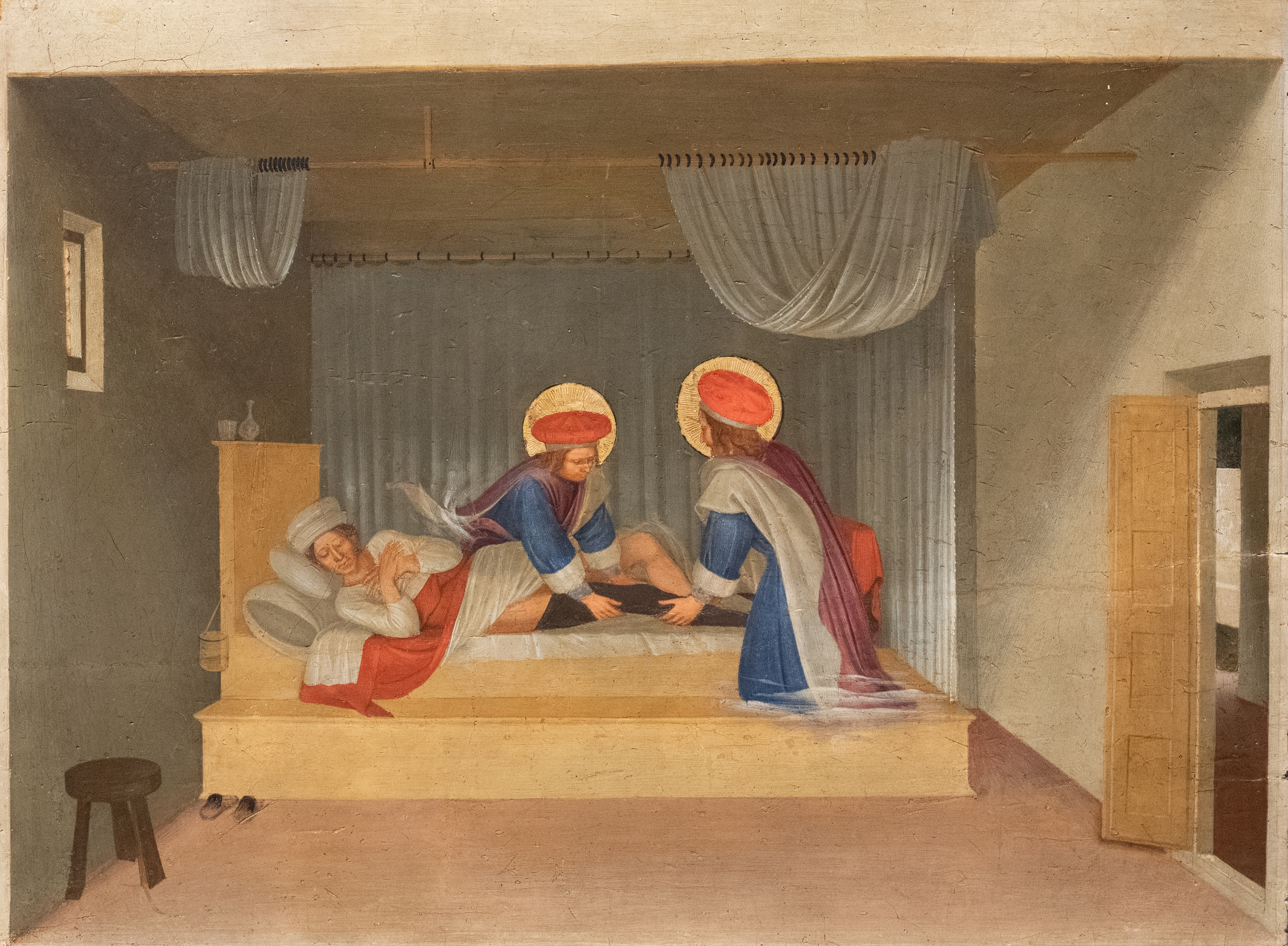
Fra Angelico, The Healing of Deacon Justinian by Saints Cosmas and Damian (San Marco Altarpiece predella)

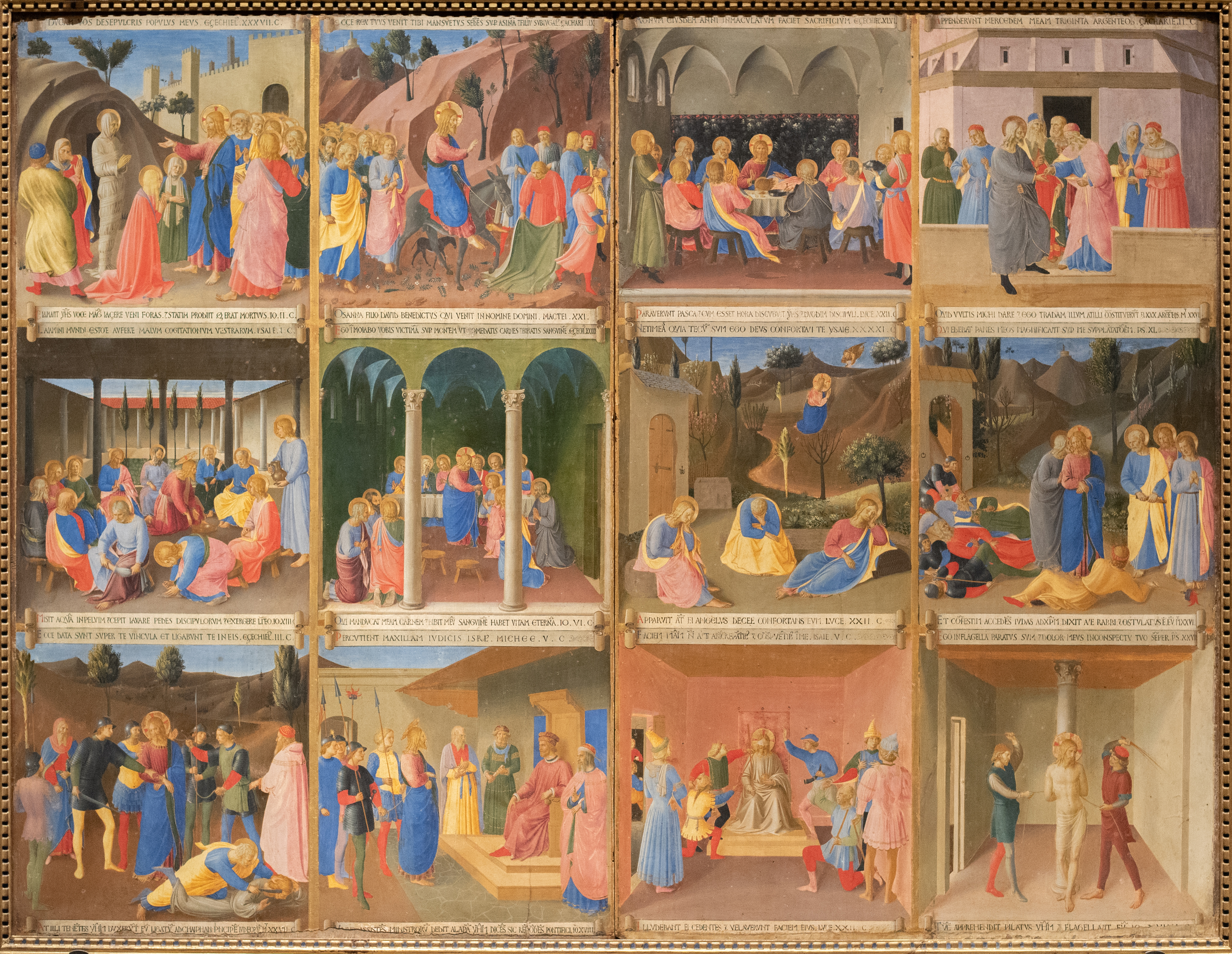
Fra Angelico, Armadio degli Argenti panel

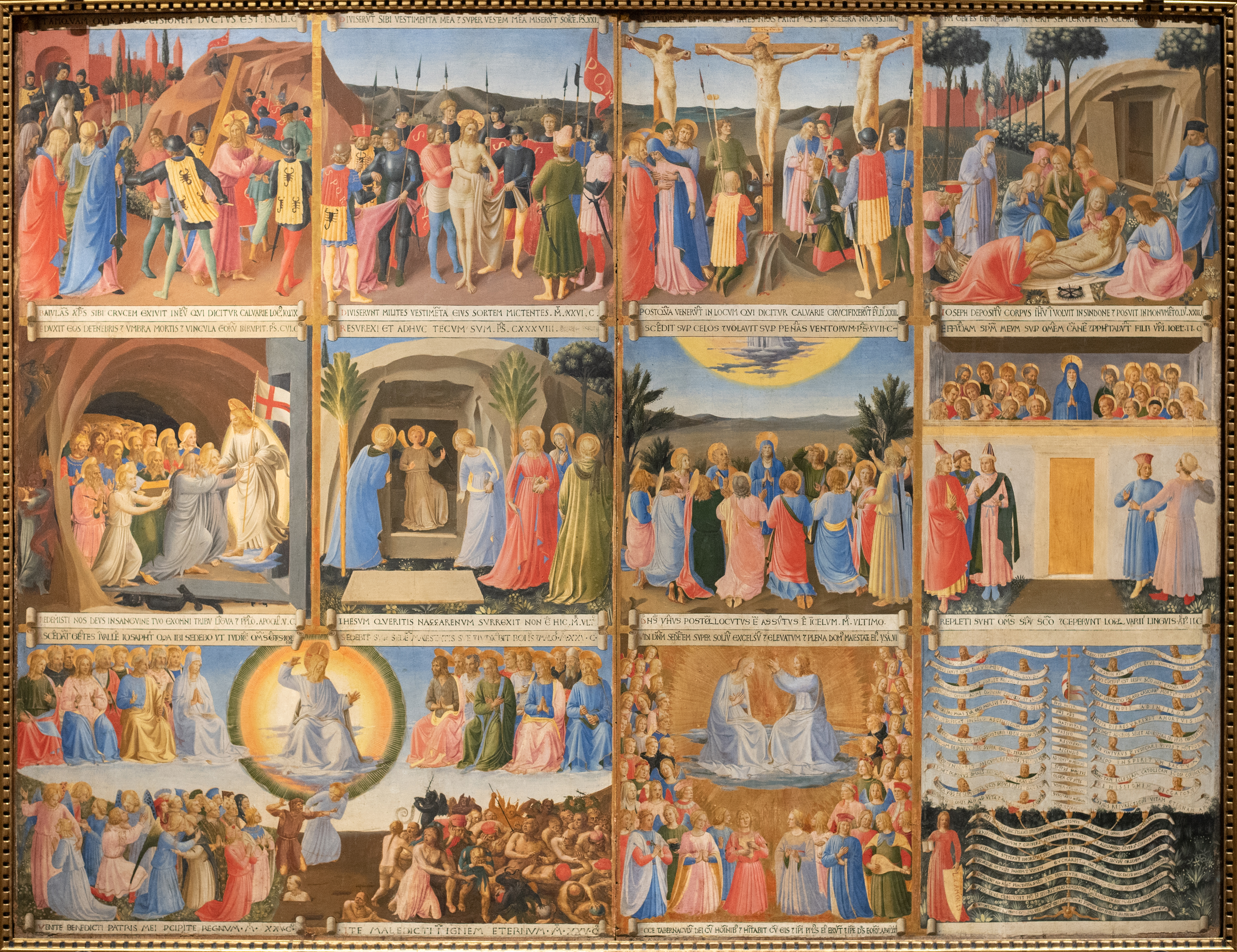
Fra Angelico, Armadio degli Argenti panel

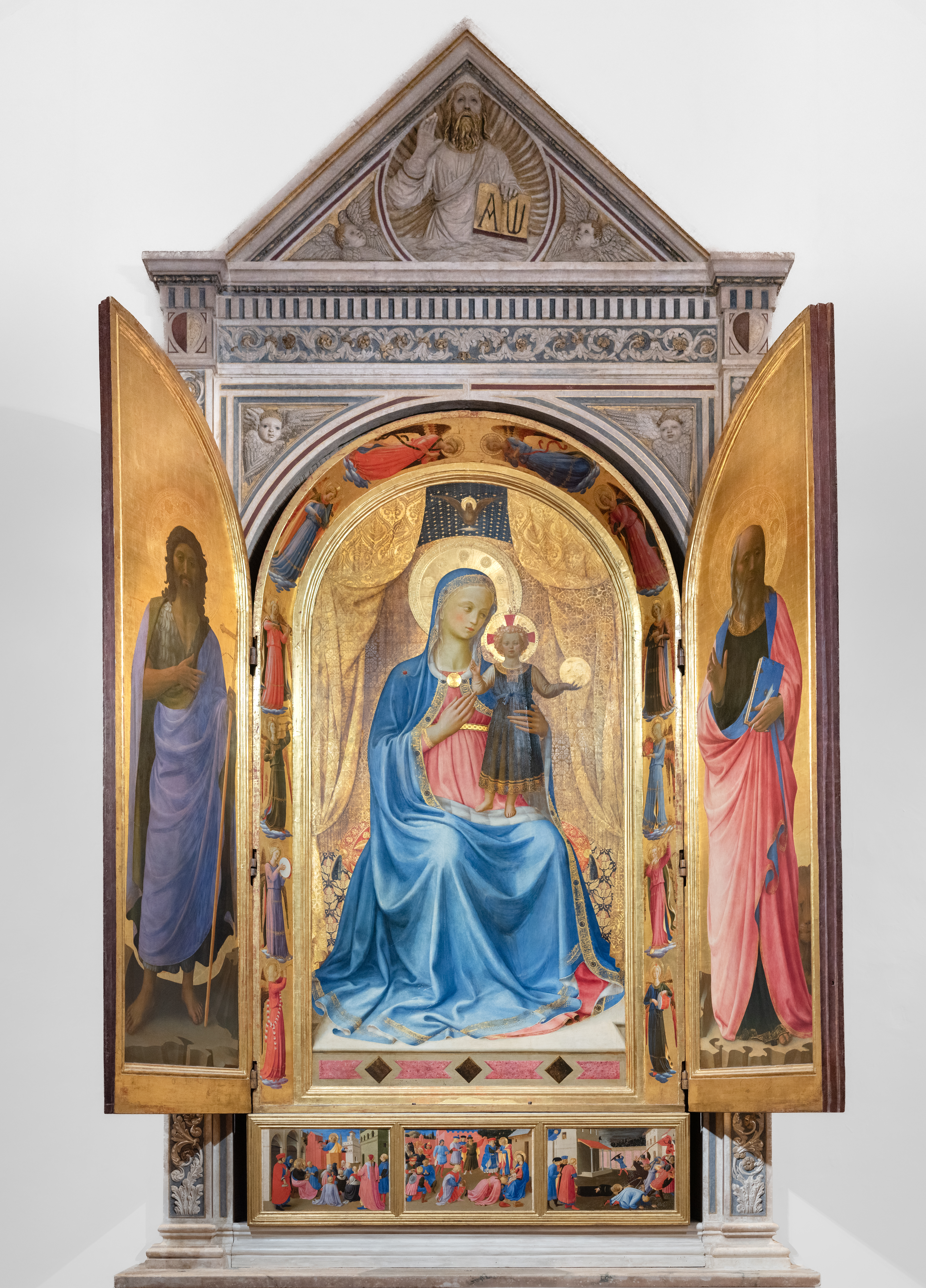
Fra Angelico, Tabernacle of the Linaioli

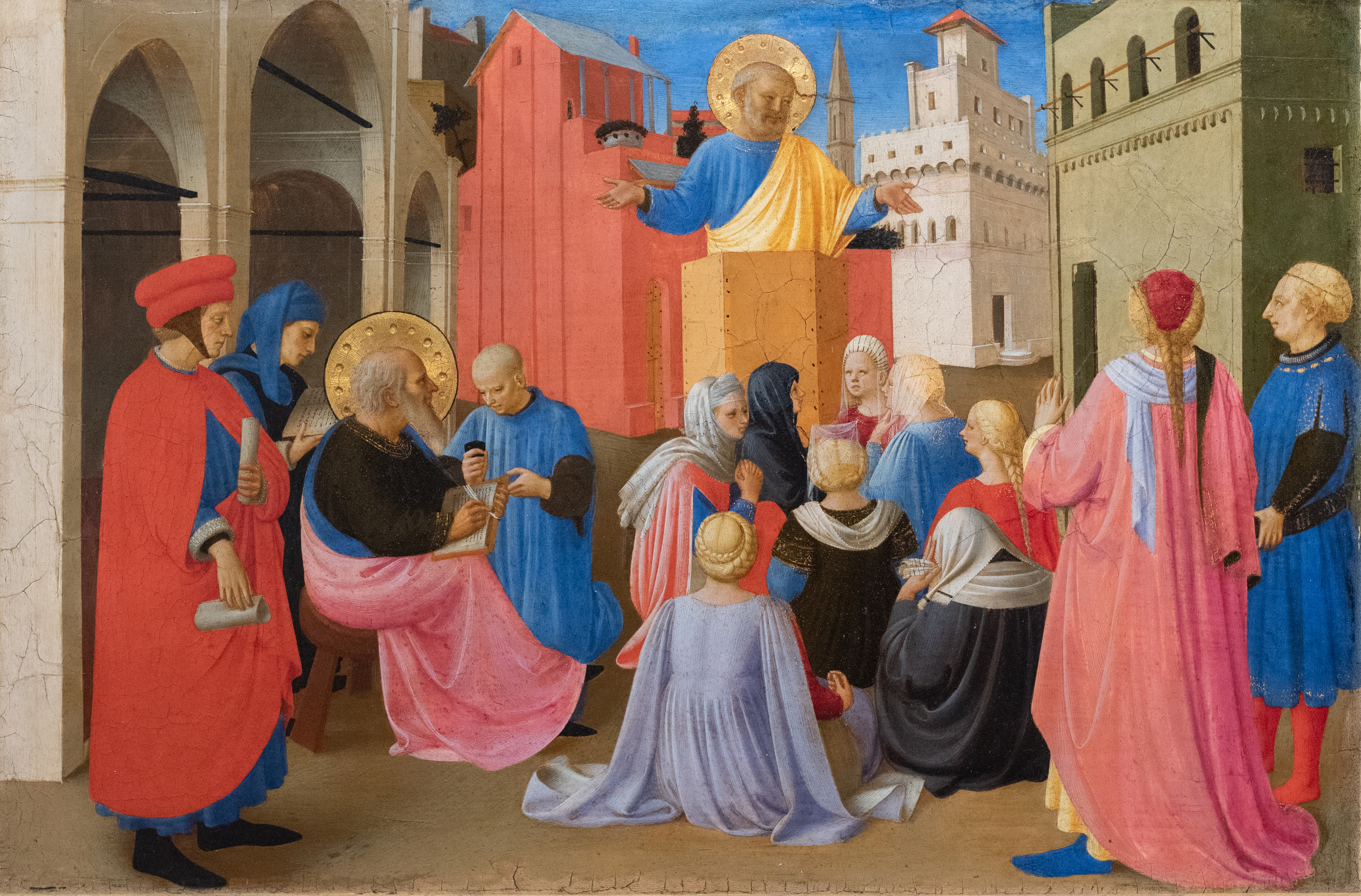
Fra Angelico, St Peter Preaching in the Presence of St Mark

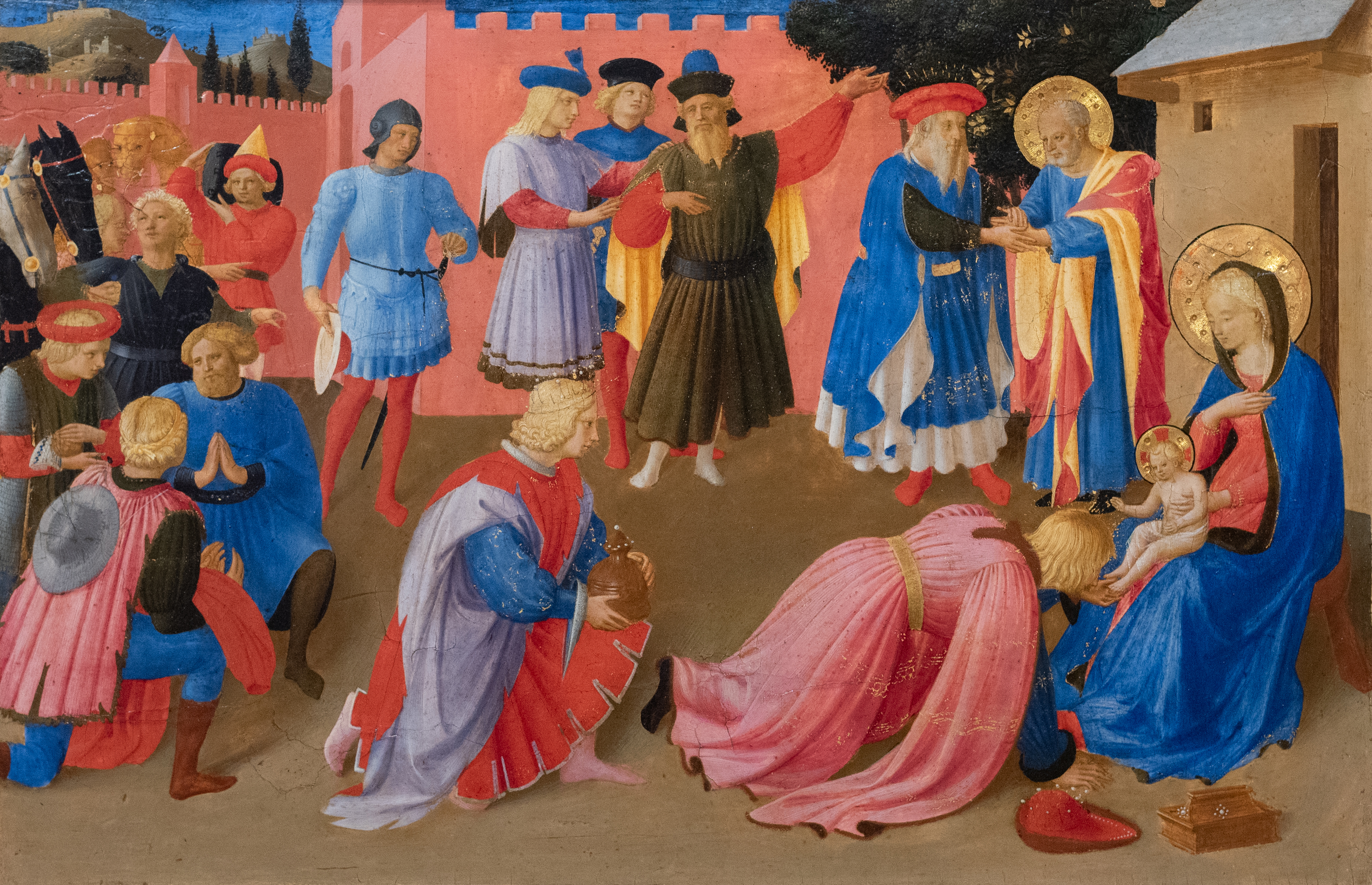
Fra Angelico, Adoration of the Magi

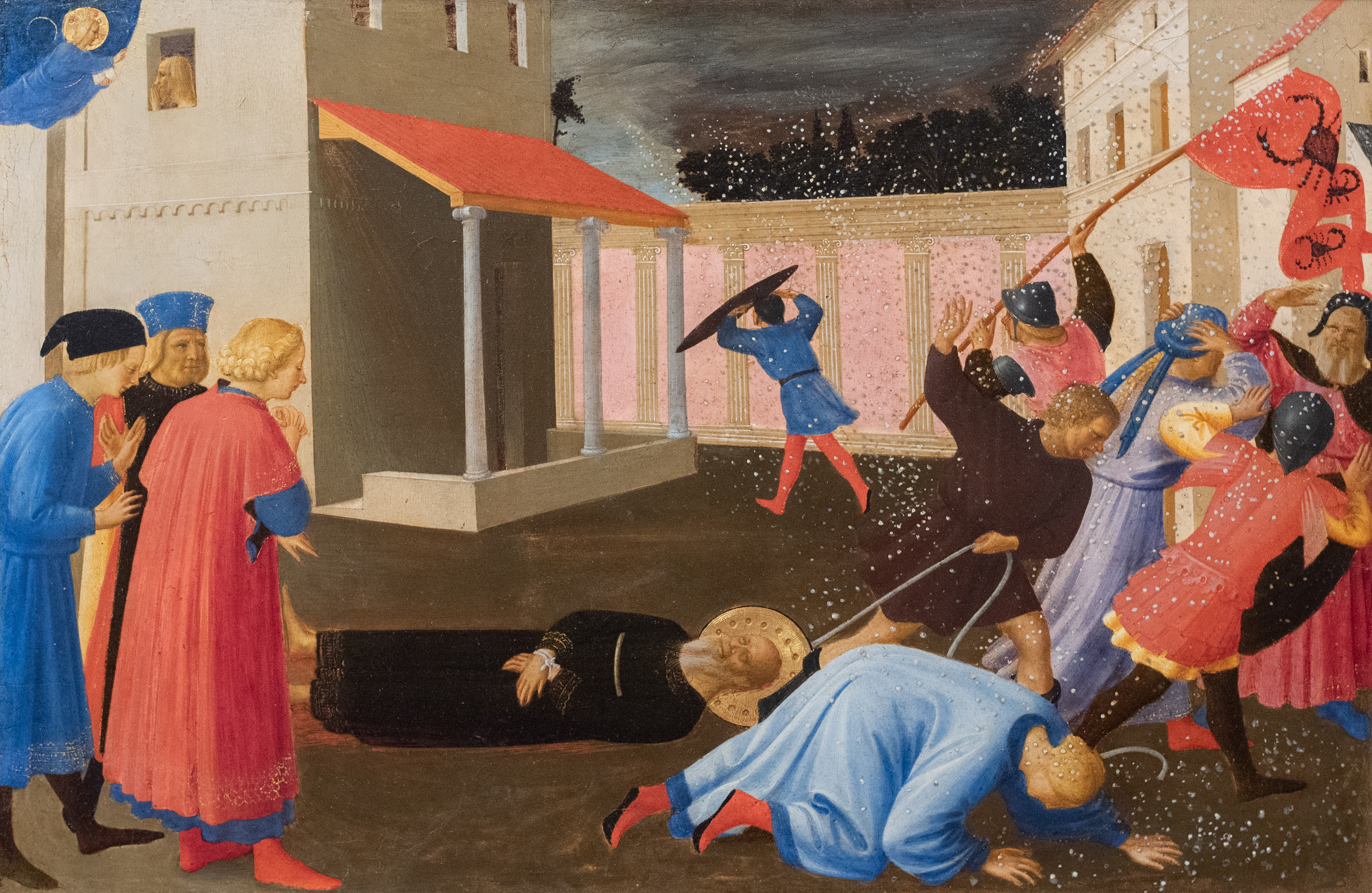
Fra Angelico, The Martyrdom of Saint Mark

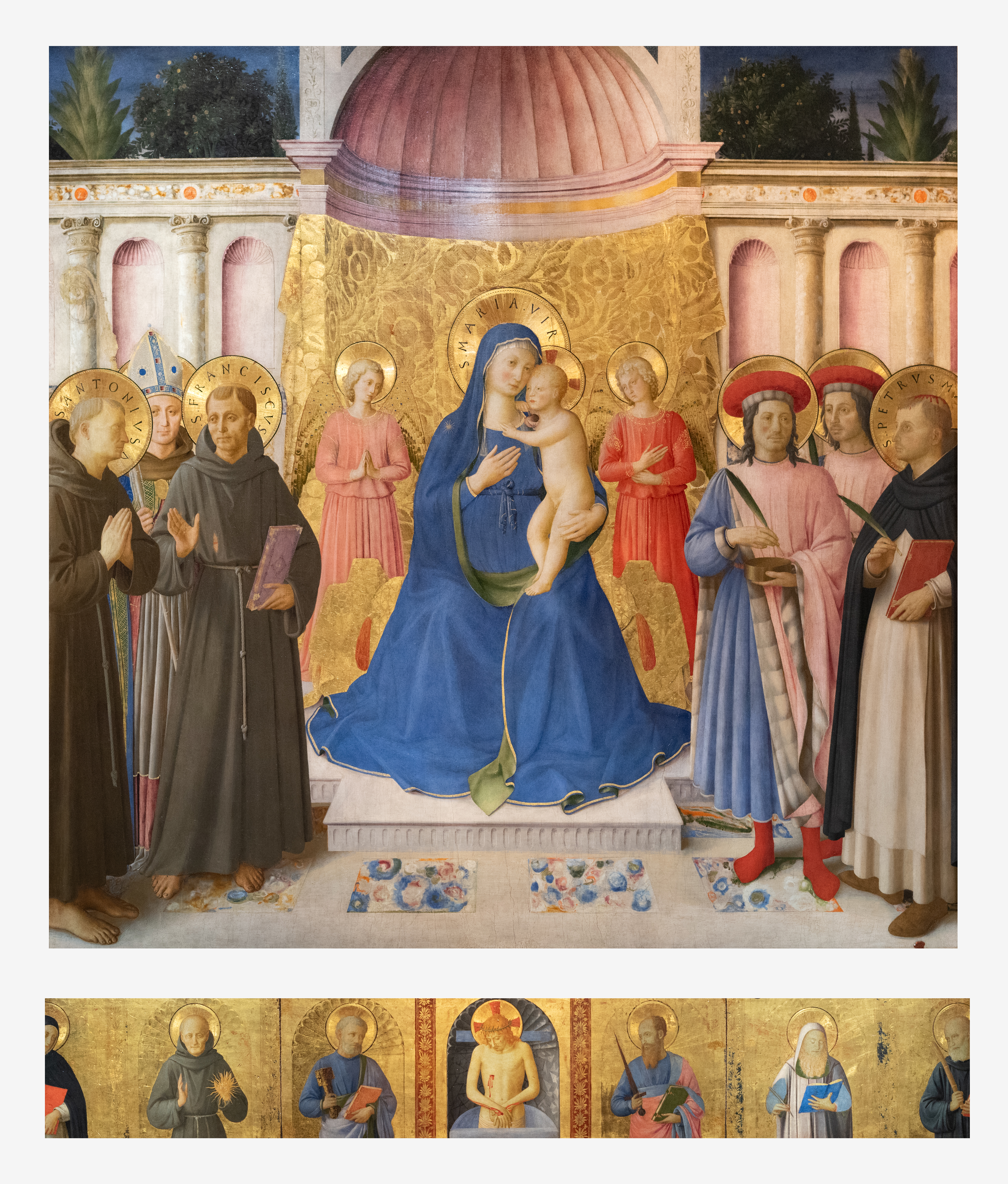
Fra Angelico, Bosco ai Frati Altarpiece
