= Fra Lippo Lippi (disambiguation) =

Fra Lippo Lippi can refer to:

- Filippo Lippi, a Florentine painter
- Fra Lippo Lippi (band), a Norwegian band
- Fra Lippo Lippi (poem), written by Robert Browning
