= Coronation of the Virgin (Filippo Lippi) =

Painting by Filippo Lippi

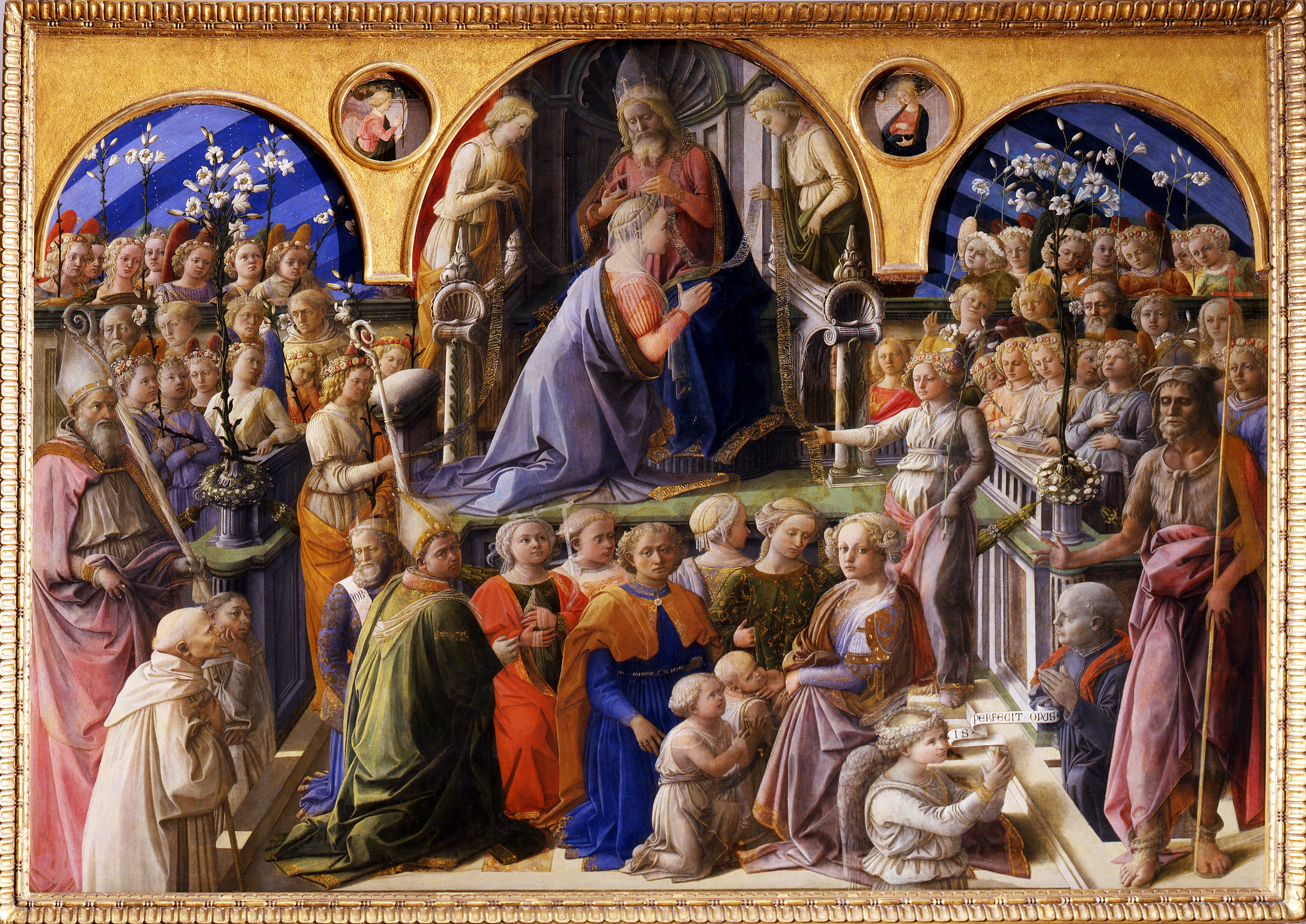
- Artist: Filippo Lippi
- Year: 1441–1447
- Medium: Tempera on panel
- Dimensions: 220 cm × 287 cm (87 in × 113 in)
- Location: Uffizi, Florence

The Coronation of the Virgin (in Italian Incoronazione Maringhi) is a painting of the Coronation of the Virgin by the Italian Renaissance master Filippo Lippi, in the Uffizi, Florence.

== History ==
Francesco Maringhi, procuratore of the church of Sant'Ambrogio in Florence, left money after his death in 1441 for a new painting at the high altar of the church. Bills of the payments for the work until 1447 have been preserved.

In the late 1430s, brother Filippo Lippi had left the convent of the Carmine convent to open an artist workshop of his own; however, having no money enough to pay assistants and apprentices, he worked alone with two usual collaborators, Fra Carnevale and Fra Diamante, along with an unknown "Piero di Lorenzo dipintore". For the Coronation of the Virgin, however, Lippi had to call in a total of six external painters, who were responsible also for the gilded framework, now lost. Originally the work had a predella, also lost, with the exception of a small panel with a Miracle of Saint Ambrose, now in the Gemäldegalerie, Berlin.

The work was immediately admired and was copied by numerous painters. It remained in Sant'Ambrogio until 1810, when it was stolen. Later it was sold to the Galleria dell'Accademia in Florence, from where it was transferred to the Galleria degli Uffizi.

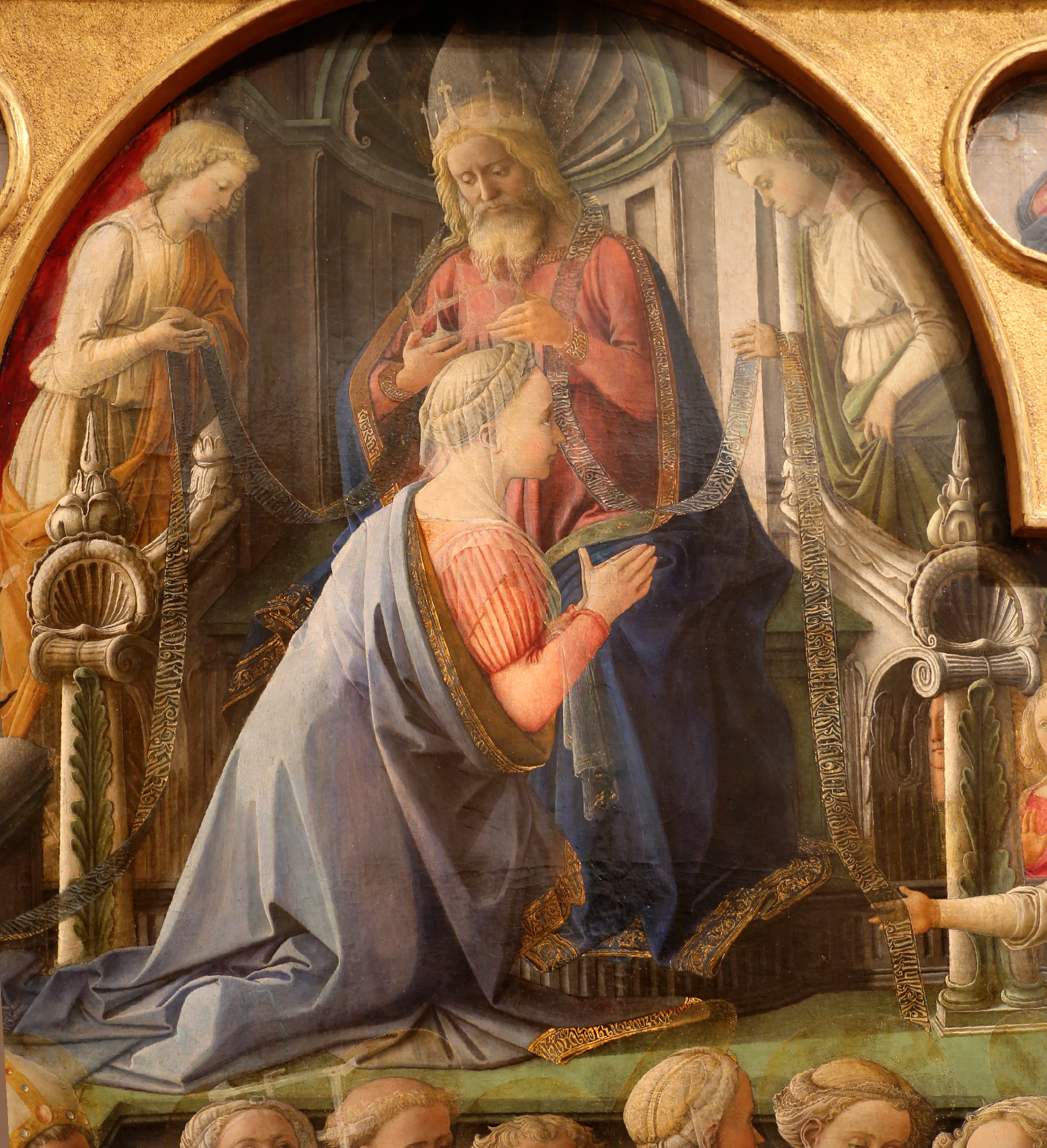

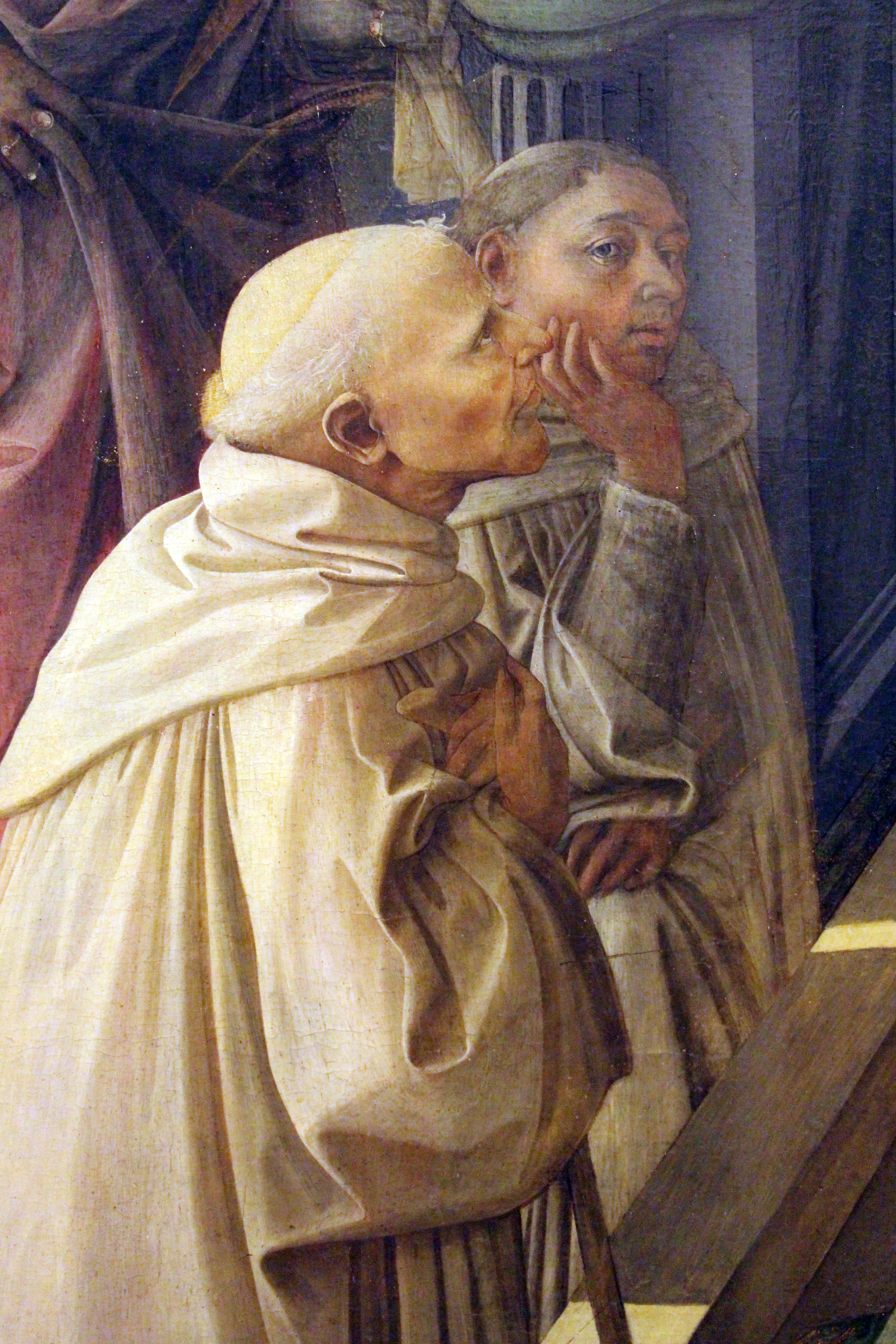

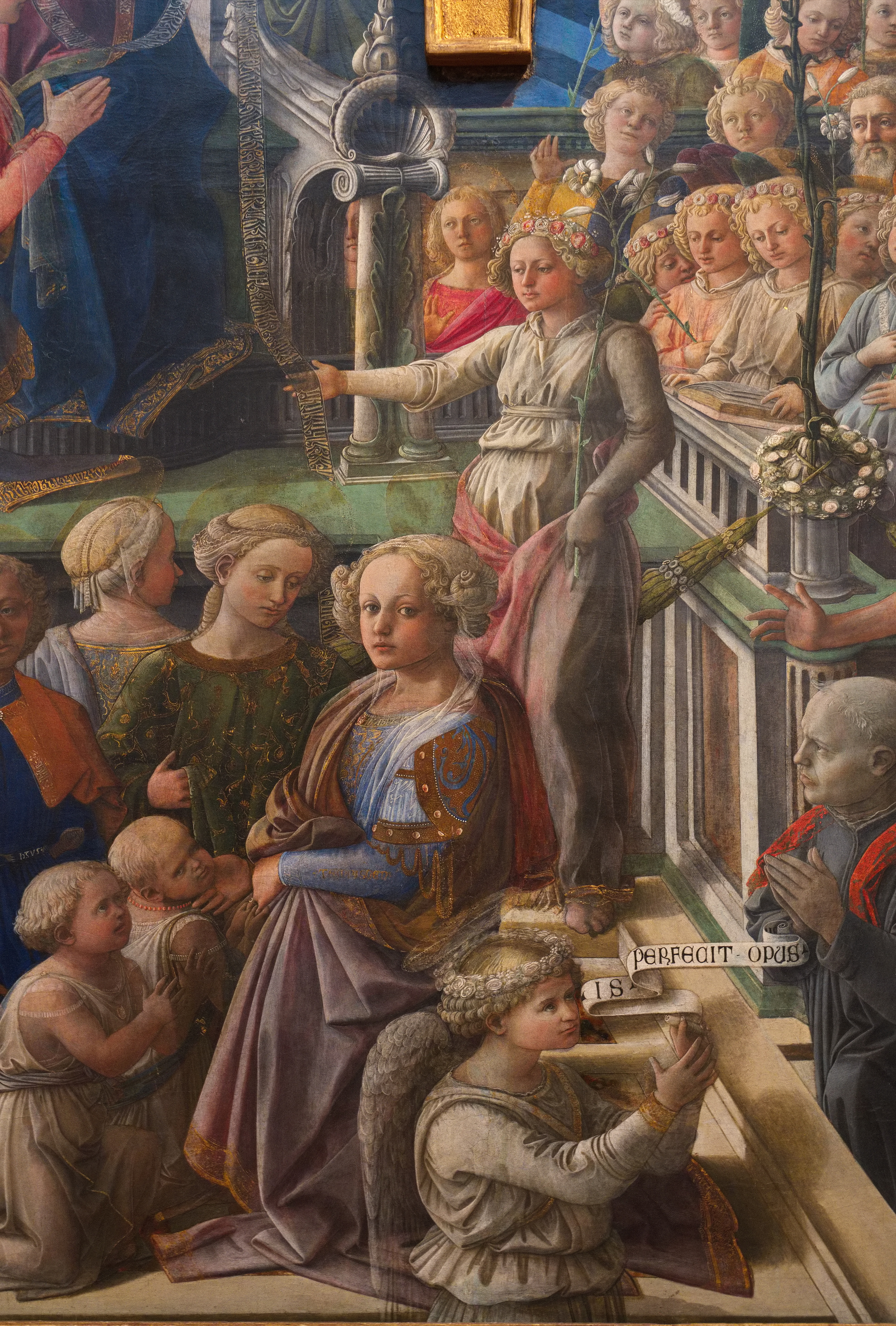

== Description ==
The work is composed of a single panel, divided by the arches into the traditional three sectors of a (winged) altarpiece. At the sides of the central arch are two tondos, depicting the Angel of Annunciation and the Virgin.

The main scene features a crowd of biblical figures, angels and saints, portrayed in informal positions; most of them are presumed to be portraits of existing people. As usual, the scene is set in Heaven, but Lippi decided to avoid the outdated gold ground, replacing it with a striped sky. In the middle, in a commanding position, Christ=God is sitting on a majestic marble throne in an exaggerated perspectival view, whose armrests encompass the kneeling Madonna who is going to be crowned. The latter includes the shell-shaped niche, featured in other paintings by Lippi.

Four angels hold a gilded ribbon, while in the lower level is a series of kneeling saints; on the left and right are other two groups of saints and angels, inspired to the crowded choirs of older works, such as the Incoronation of the Virgin by Lorenzo Monaco. The elevated pavement of the side groups creates a perspective triangle whose apex is the Virgin's head.

Amongst the figures in the middle can be recognized Mary Magdalene and Saint Eustace (titular of one of the most important altars in the church) with his sons and his wife. These figures are shorter than normal, as the painter imagined them to be correctly seen from below, in perspective, by the nuns of the Sant'Ambrogio convent from their separated choirs.

Kneeling at the side are the work's commissioner, facing a cartouche with the write ISTE PERFECIT OPUS ("this one finished the work"), while on the left is a self-portrait of Filippo Lippi in the religious habit of a Carmelite friar (as he was). Standing on the sides are the two titular saints of the church: Saint Ambrose (left) and Saint John the Baptist (right), whose austere representation reveal the influence of Masaccio.

This painting is described at length in lines 344–389 of Robert Browning's poem 'Fra Lippo Lippi', published in 1855 in his collection Men and Women.

== Sources ==
- Galleria degli Uffizi. Florence. 2003.
