= Madonna of Palazzo Medici-Riccardi =

Painting by Filippo Lippi

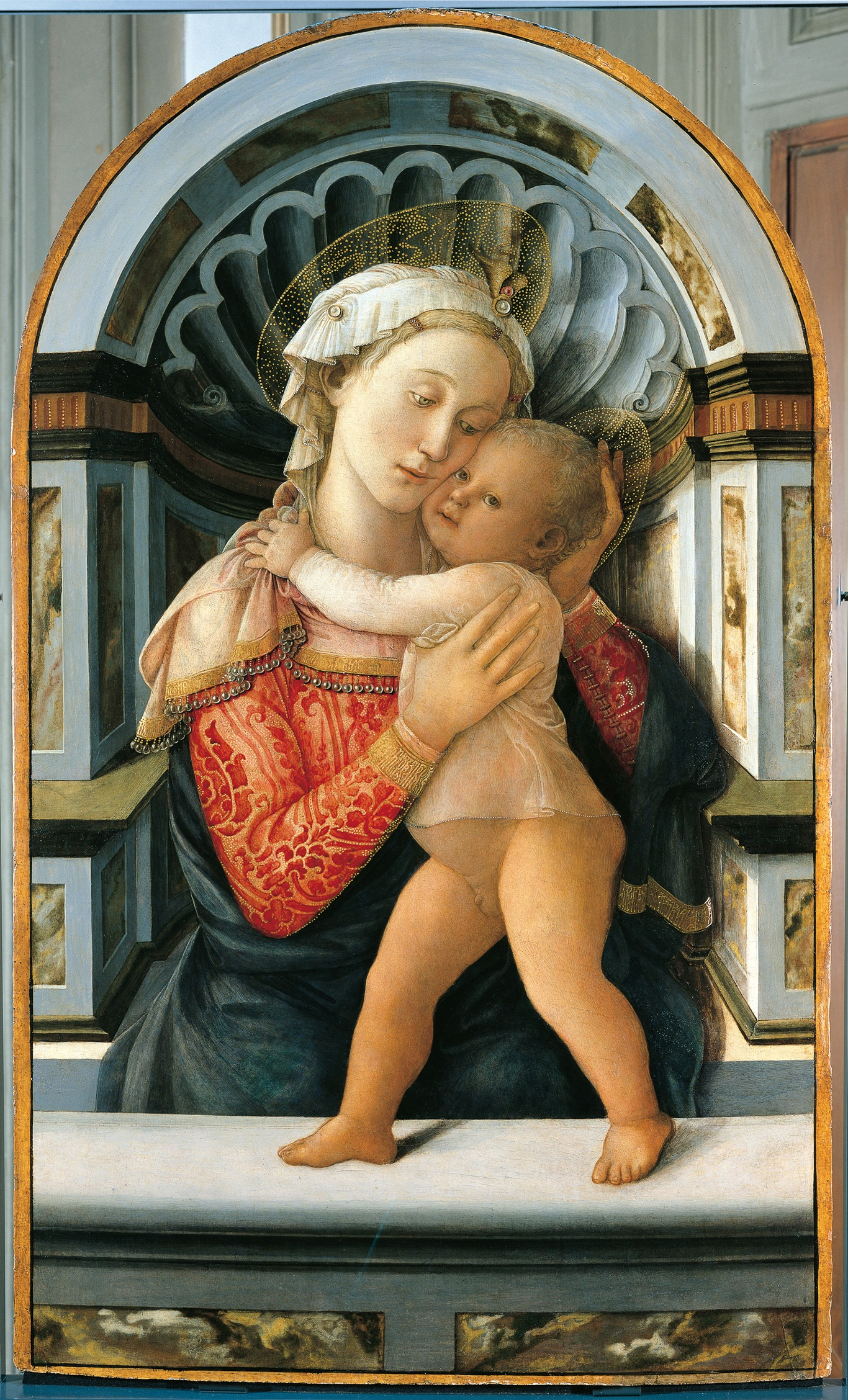
- Artist: Filippo Lippi
- Year: c. 1466–1469
- Medium: Tempera on panel
- Dimensions: 115 cm × 71 cm (45 in × 28 in)
- Location: Palazzo Medici-Riccardi, Florence

The Madonna of Palazzo Medici-Riccardi is a painting by the Italian Renaissance artist Filippo Lippi. It is housed in the Palazzo Medici-Riccardi of Florence, central Italy.

== History ==
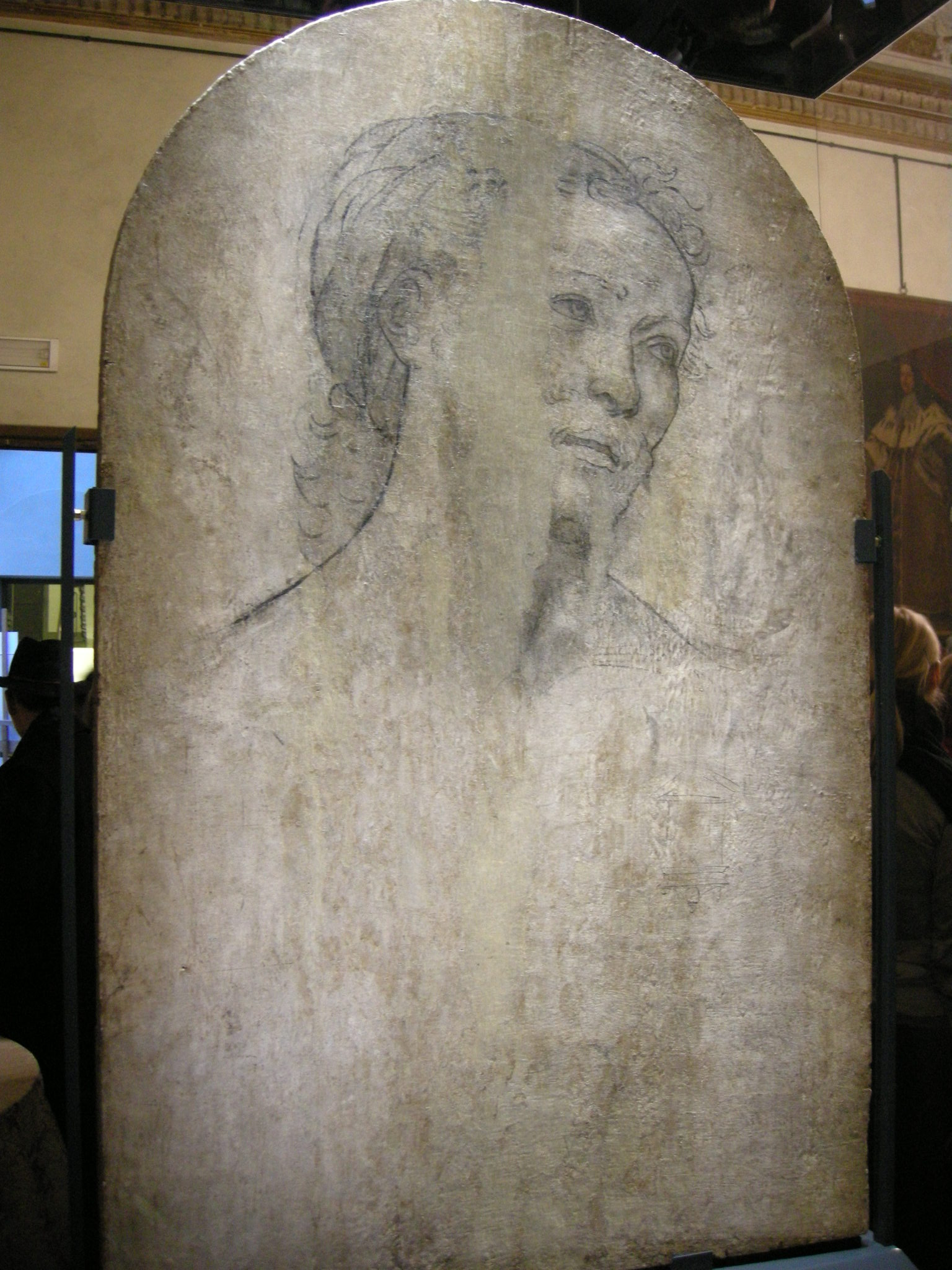
Rear view.

The painting was found by art historian Giuseppe Poggi in 1907 in the psychiatric hospital of San Salvi in Florence. There are several theories about the provenance of the panel: Poggi assigned it to the Villa of Castelpulci, owned by the Riccardi family, who bought Palazzo Medici in 1655. According to another, the Madonna was instead part of the original decoration of the palace.

After having been acquired by the Italian state, it was moved to Palazzo Medici-Riccardi, where now is displayed in the Hall of the Triumphs and Arts in the first floor, near the gallery of Luca Giordano. It has been restored in 2001 by the Opificio delle Pietre Dure.

== Description ==
The model of the painting had been used by Lippi since as early as 1436: it portrays the Madonna's half-bust in a niche with a shell-shaped dome, holding the Child; in this case, he stands on a marble parapet. The style is however typical of his late career, not far from the frescoes in the Cathedral of Spoleto, and is thus generally considered one of the artists' last panels.

The rear of the panel has a drawing with St. Jerome's head.

== Sources ==
- Valcanover, Francesco (2007). "Vittore Carpaccio". Pittori del Rinascimento. Florence: Scala. ISBN 978-88-8117-099-9.
