= Pietà (Filippo Lippi, Milan) =

Painting by Filippo Lippi

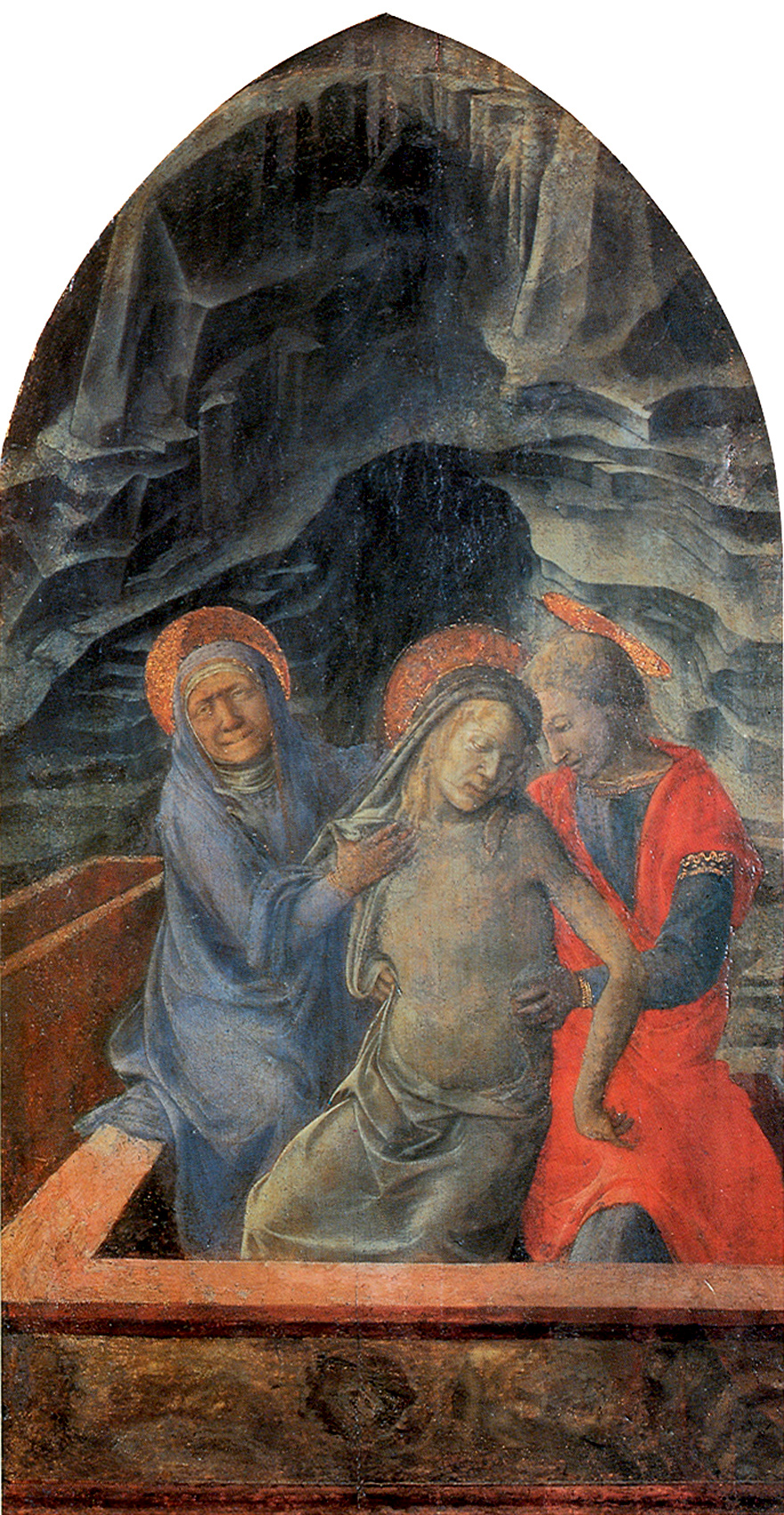
Pietà (1437–1438) by Filippo Lippi

The Pietà is a 1437–1439 tempera on panel painting by Filippo Lippi, now in the Museo Poldi Pezzoli in Milan.

It probably formed part of a small altarpiece for private devotion and draws on the low relief of the sculpture style of Donatello. It is theorised that the work was the painting Giorgio Vasari mentions as Lippi produced for Cosimo the Elder as a gift for Pope Eugene IV, who was then living in Florence.
