= Enthroned Madonna and Child (Filippo Lippi) =

Painting by Filippo Lippi

Enthroned Madonna and Child or Madonna of Tarquinia
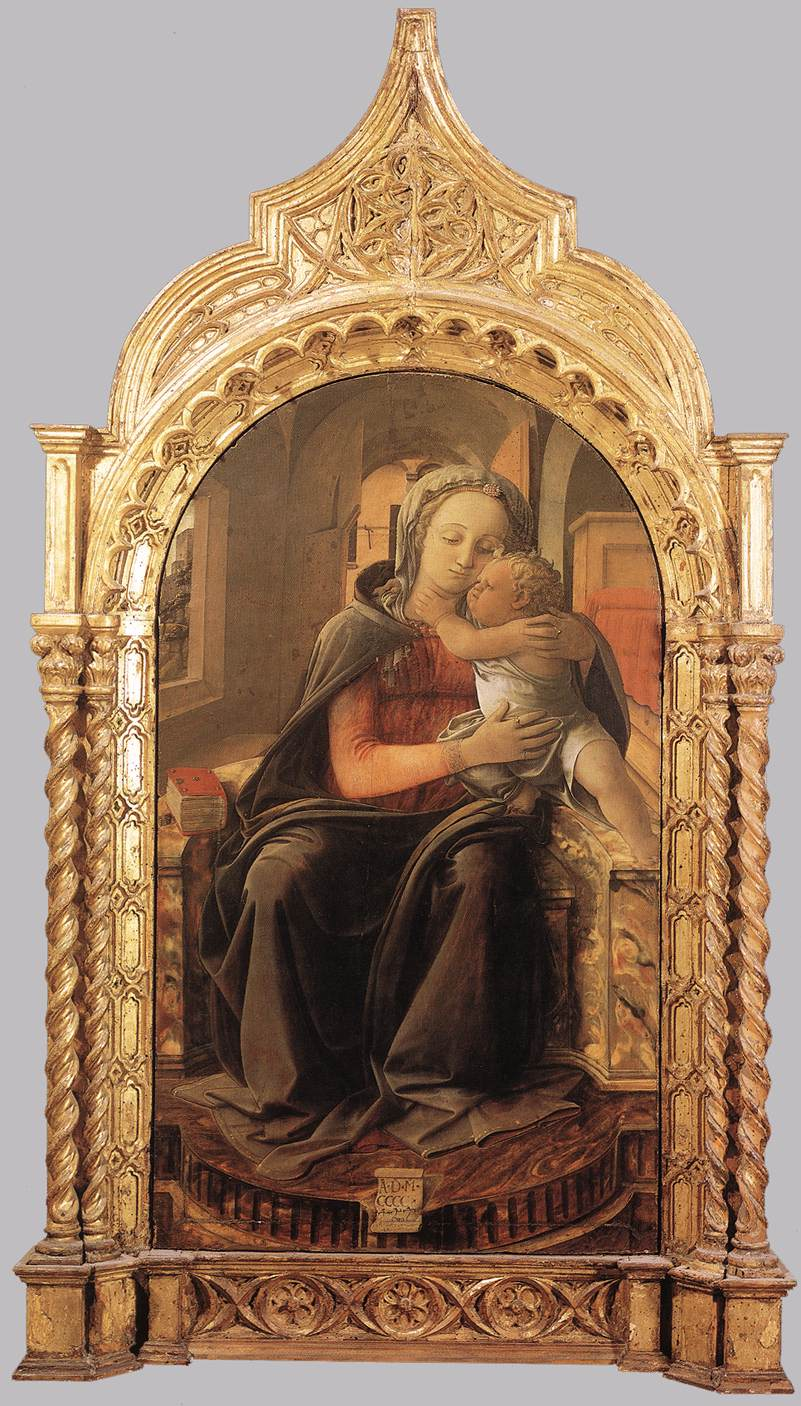
- Artist: Filippo Lippi
- Year: 1437
- Medium: Tempera on panel
- Dimensions: 114 cm × 65 cm (45 in × 26 in)
- Location: Galleria Nazionale d'Arte Antica, Rome

The Enthroned Madonna and Child (also known as Madonna of Tarquinia) is a painting by the Italian Renaissance painter Filippo Lippi. It is housed in the Galleria Nazionale d'Arte Antica of Palazzo Barberini, Rome.

The work, dated "A.D. M. MCCCCXXXVII" (1437) on the cartouche, was commissioned by Giovanni Vitelleschi, Papal military commander and archbishop of Florence. The painting was probably destined for his palace in his native city of Corneto (now Tarquinia).

The centre of the composition is the face of the Madonna, who sits on a precious throne holding the Child. The attention to the volumes, inspired by Masaccio, is intermingled with the care for landscape and the light effects, which Lippi studied in the Flemish masters: the latter can be seen, for example, in details such as the pantoscopic view in the window on the left and the presence of precious objects.
