= Annunciation (Filippo Lippi, London) =

Painting by Fra Filippo Lippi

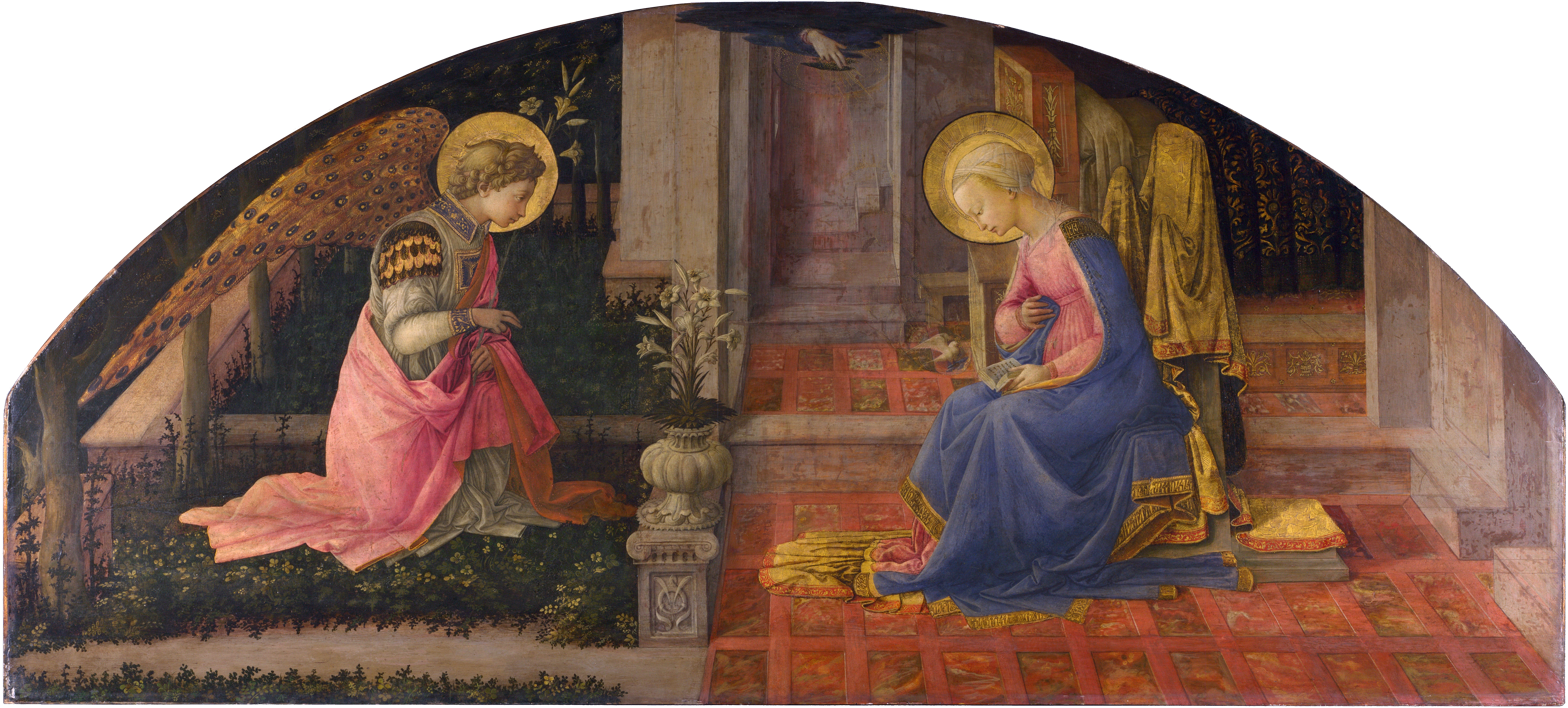
- Artist: Filippo Lippi
- Year: c. 1449–1459
- Medium: Tempera on wood
- Dimensions: 68 cm × 151.5 cm (27 in × 59.6 in)
- Location: National Gallery, London, UK

The Annunciation is a tempera on panel painting by the Italian Renaissance master Filippo Lippi, dating to c. 1449–1459, in the collection of the National Gallery, London. It is a pendant to Lippi's Seven Saints, also in the National Gallery. The lunettes were commissioned as part of the decoration of the Palazzo Medici in Florence, where they were likely placed above a door or a bed.

There is general agreement on Lippi's authorship of the panels, but their dating is less certain; they were produced some time between Lorenzo the Magnificent's birth in 1449 and the completion of the palace's furnishing in 1459. That their patron belonged to the Medici family is testified by the presence of Piero di Cosimo de' Medici's coat of arms (three feathers crossed by a ring with diamond and cartouche) at the base of the small column with a vase which divides the painting in two.

The painting depicts the Annunciation of Mary with the archangel Gabriel (left) and Mary (right). God, whose hand can be seen at the lunette's top is blessing Mary through the dove symbolizing the Holy Ghost.

Both lunettes were acquired in 1855 from the Metzger Brothers by Sir Charles Eastlake and donated to the National Gallery in 1861.
