= Life of the Virgin (Filippo Lippi) =

Cycle of frescos by Filippo Lippi

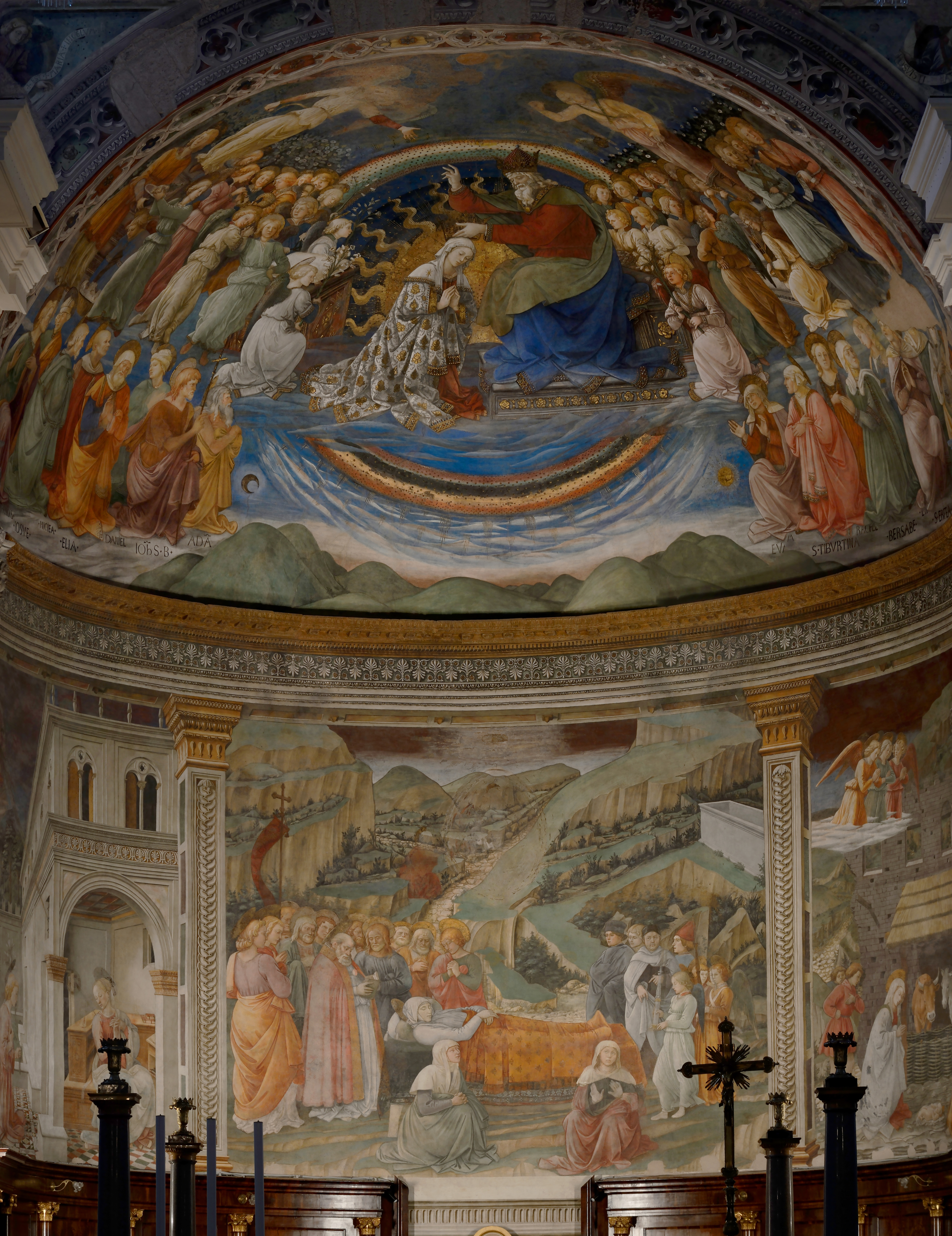
The fresco

Scenes from the Life of the Virgin Mary (Italian - Le Storie della Vergine) is a cycle of frescos by Filippo Lippi in Spoleto Cathedral.

== History ==
The cycle was commissioned in 1466, when Lippi had completed his Stories of Saint Stephen and Saint John the Baptist at Prato Cathedral, and was abruptly terminated by Lippi's death in 1469, caused by poison according to Vasari's Lives of the Artists. His studio assistants completed the work in around three months. Lippi was buried in Spoleto Cathedral despite Lorenzo the Magnificent's request for the remains to be returned to Florence - Spoleto replied that unlike Florence their great new cathedral had no illustrious men buried in it.

== Scenes ==
From left to right the cycle shows:

- Annunciation
- Dormition (centre, out of chronological sequence, probably at the commissioner's request due to the cathedral's dedication to the Assumption)
- Nativity
- Coronation of the Virgin (high on the half-domed apse)

== Gallery ==
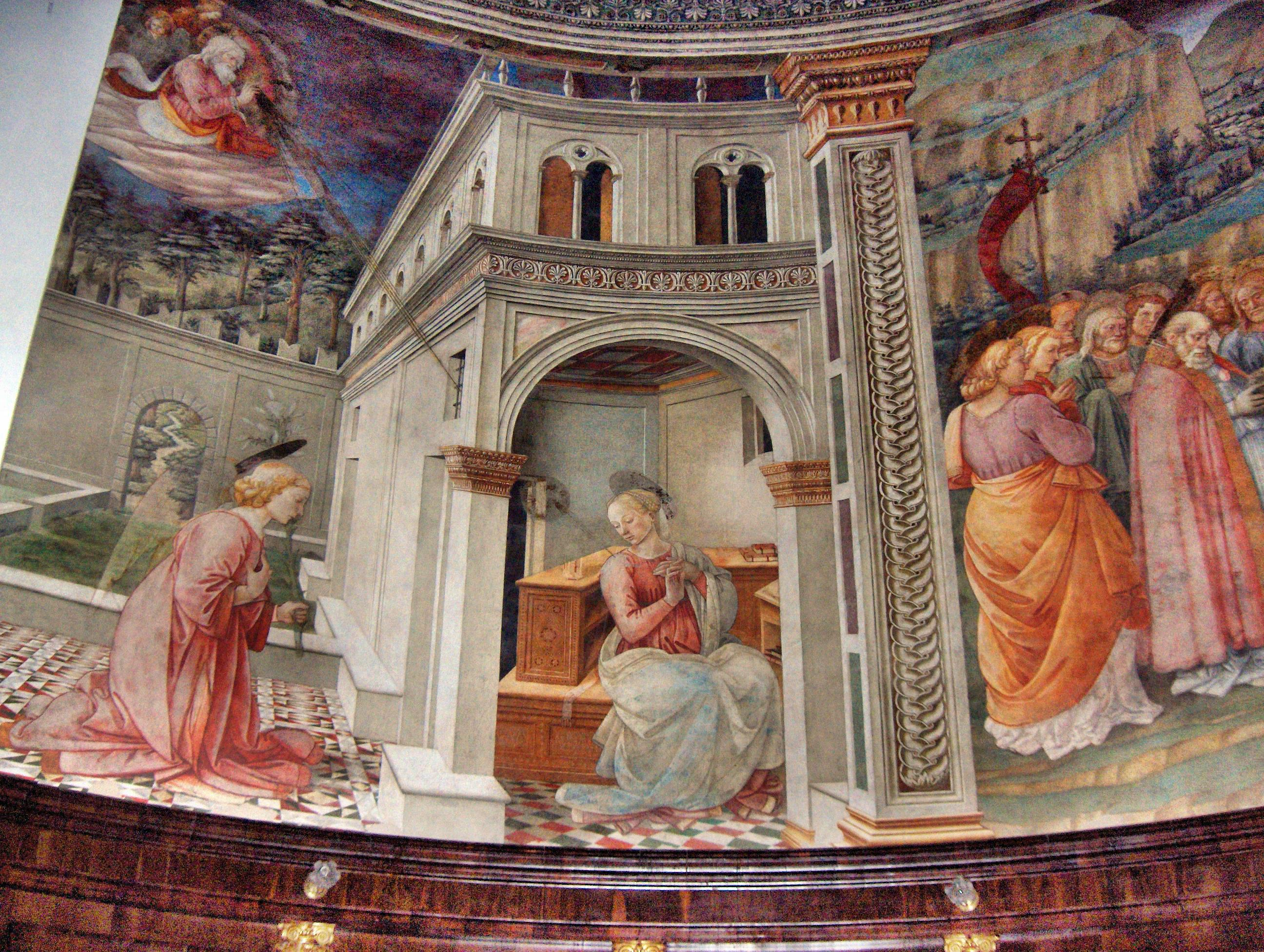
Annunciation

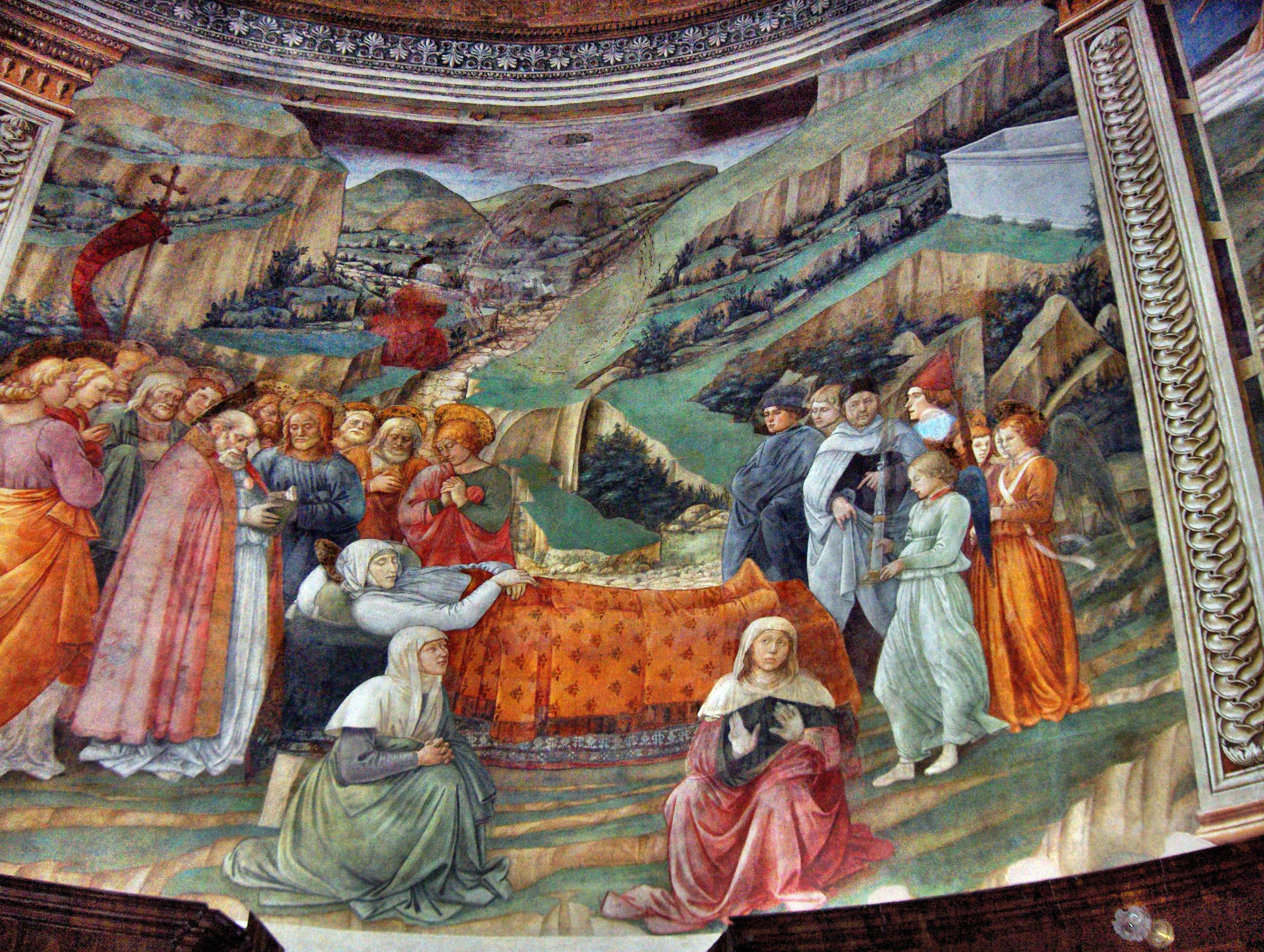
Dormition

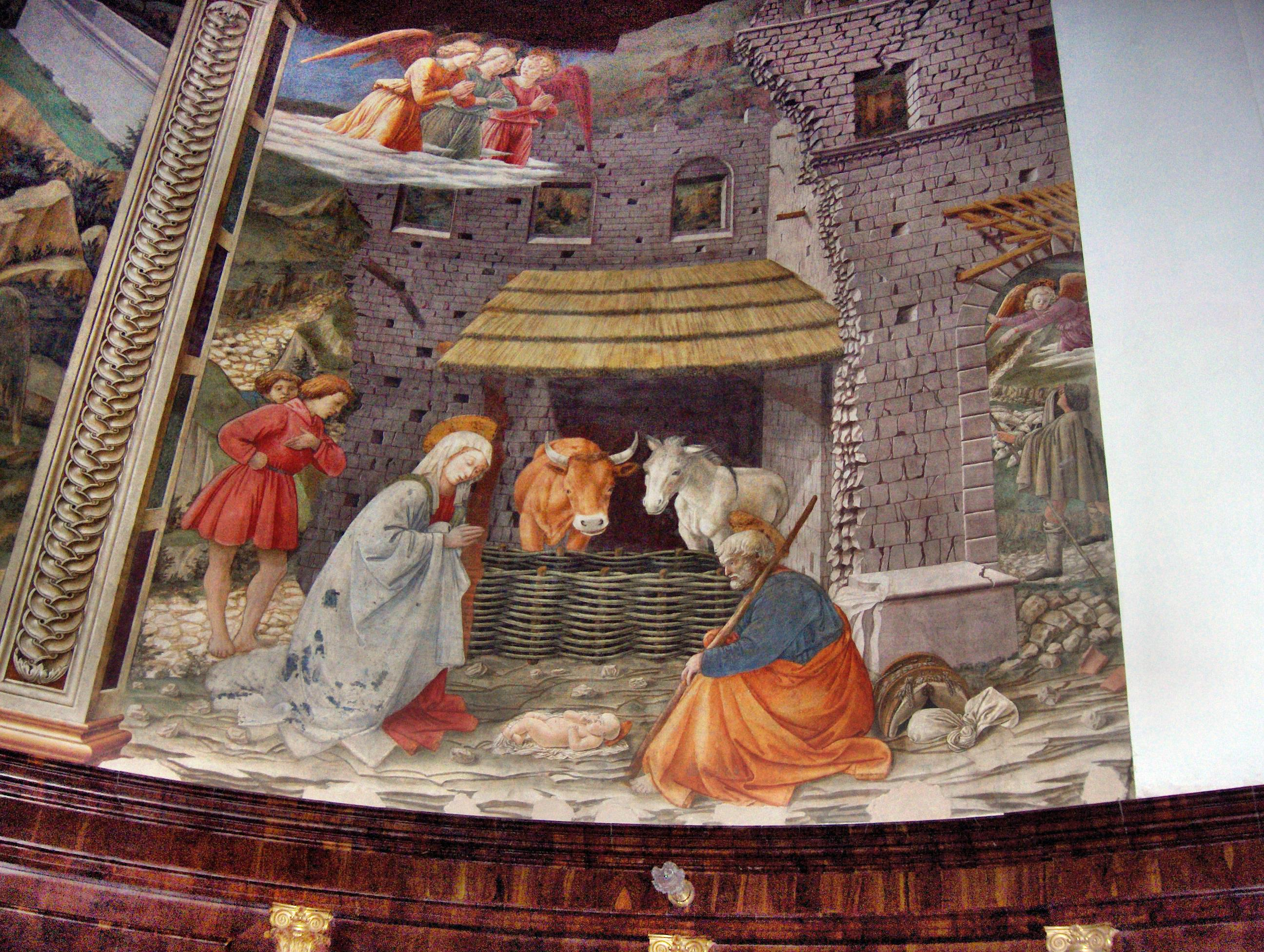
Nativity

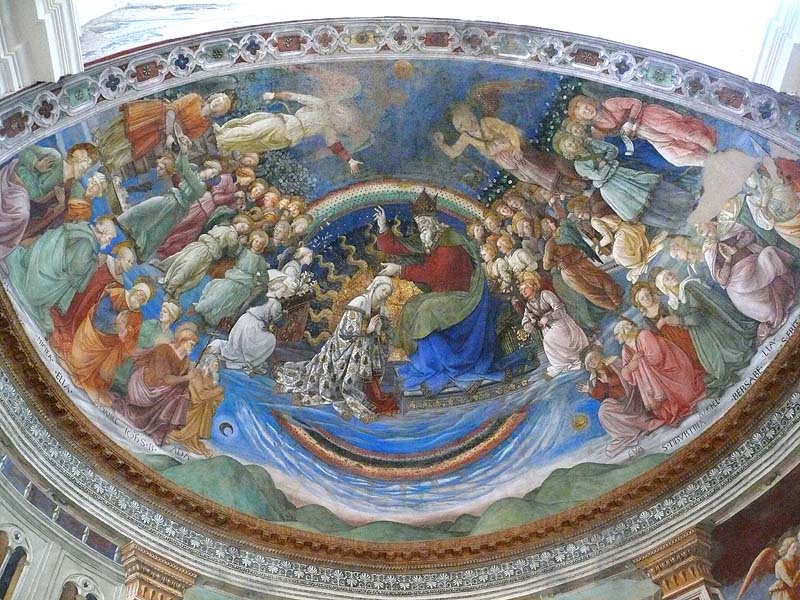
Coronation
