= Seven Saints (Filippo Lippi) =

Painting by Filippo Lippi

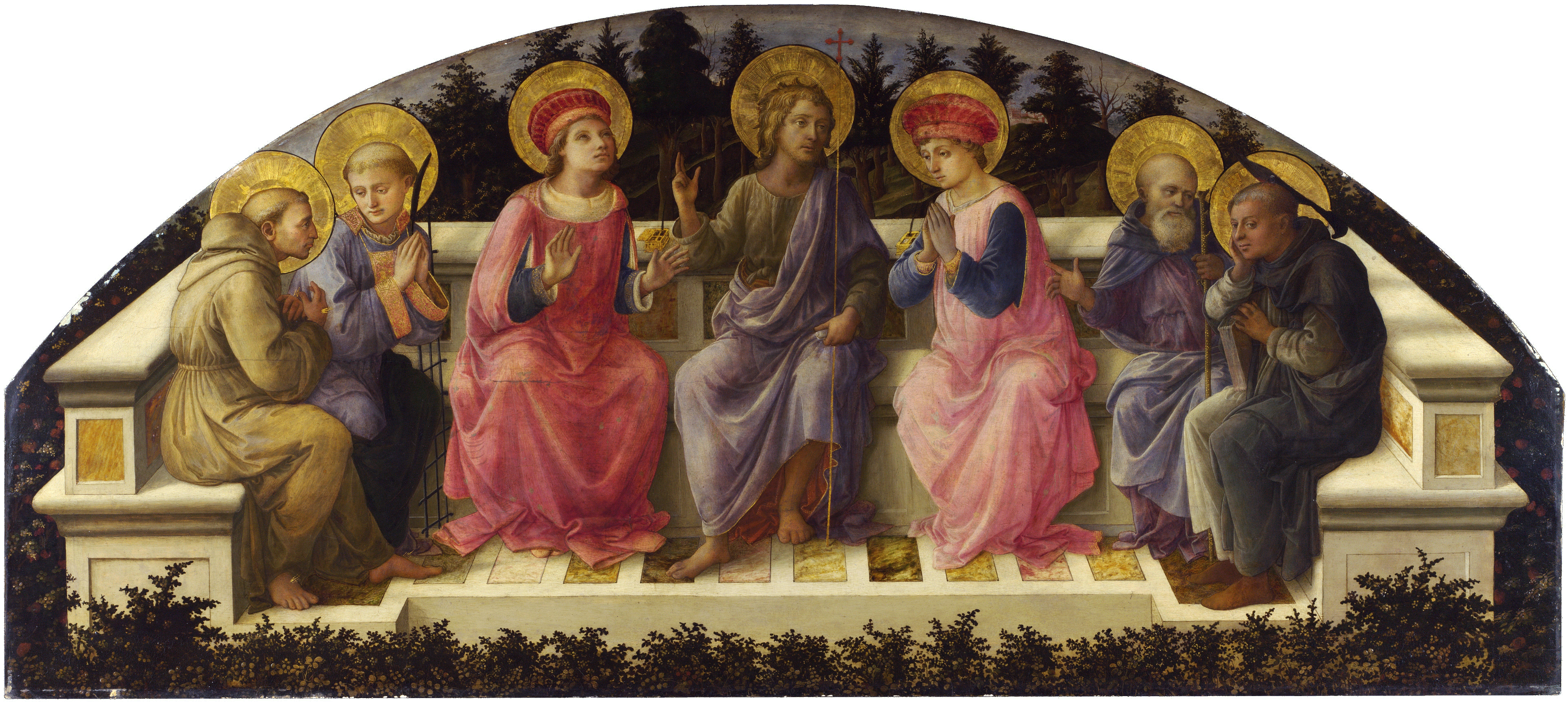
- Artist: Filippo Lippi
- Year: c. 1449–1459
- Medium: Tempera on wood
- Dimensions: 68 cm × 151.5 cm (27 in × 59.6 in)
- Location: National Gallery, London, UK

Seven Saints is a tempera on panel painting by the Italian Renaissance master Filippo Lippi, dating to c. 1449–1459, in the collection of the National Gallery, London. It is a pendant to Lippi's Annunciation, also in the National Gallery. The lunettes were commissioned as part of the decoration of the Palazzo Medici in Florence, where they were likely placed above a door or a bed.

There is general agreement on Lippi's authorship of the panels, but their dating is less certain; they were produced some time between Lorenzo the Magnificent's birth in 1449 and the completion of the palace's furnishing in 1459. That their patron belonged to the Medici family is testified by the presence of Piero di Cosimo de' Medici's coat of arms in the other lunette, and by the link between the saints depicted in this panel and the male members of the family. Piero di Cosimo lived in Palazzo Medici from 1456.

In the center is Saint John the Baptist, patron saint of Florence, flanked by the Saints Cosmas and Damian (protectors of the Medici, and in particular of Cosimo de' Medici, Piero's father). On the right, in the foreground, is Saint Peter of Verona, protector of Piero di Cosimo de' Medici, and next to him is Saint John the Evangelist, protector of his brother Giovanni. On the left, in the foreground, are Saint Francis of Assisi, the patron of Pierfrancesco the Elder (Piero's cousin), and Saint Lawrence, patron of his uncle, Lorenzo the Elder.

Both lunettes were acquired in 1855 from the Metzger brothers by Sir Charles Eastlake and donated to the National Gallery in 1861.
