= Sant'Ambrogio, Florence =

Church in Florence, Italy

Coordinates: 43.771555°N 11.266914°E

Church of Sant'Ambrogio (Chiesa di Sant'Ambrogio)
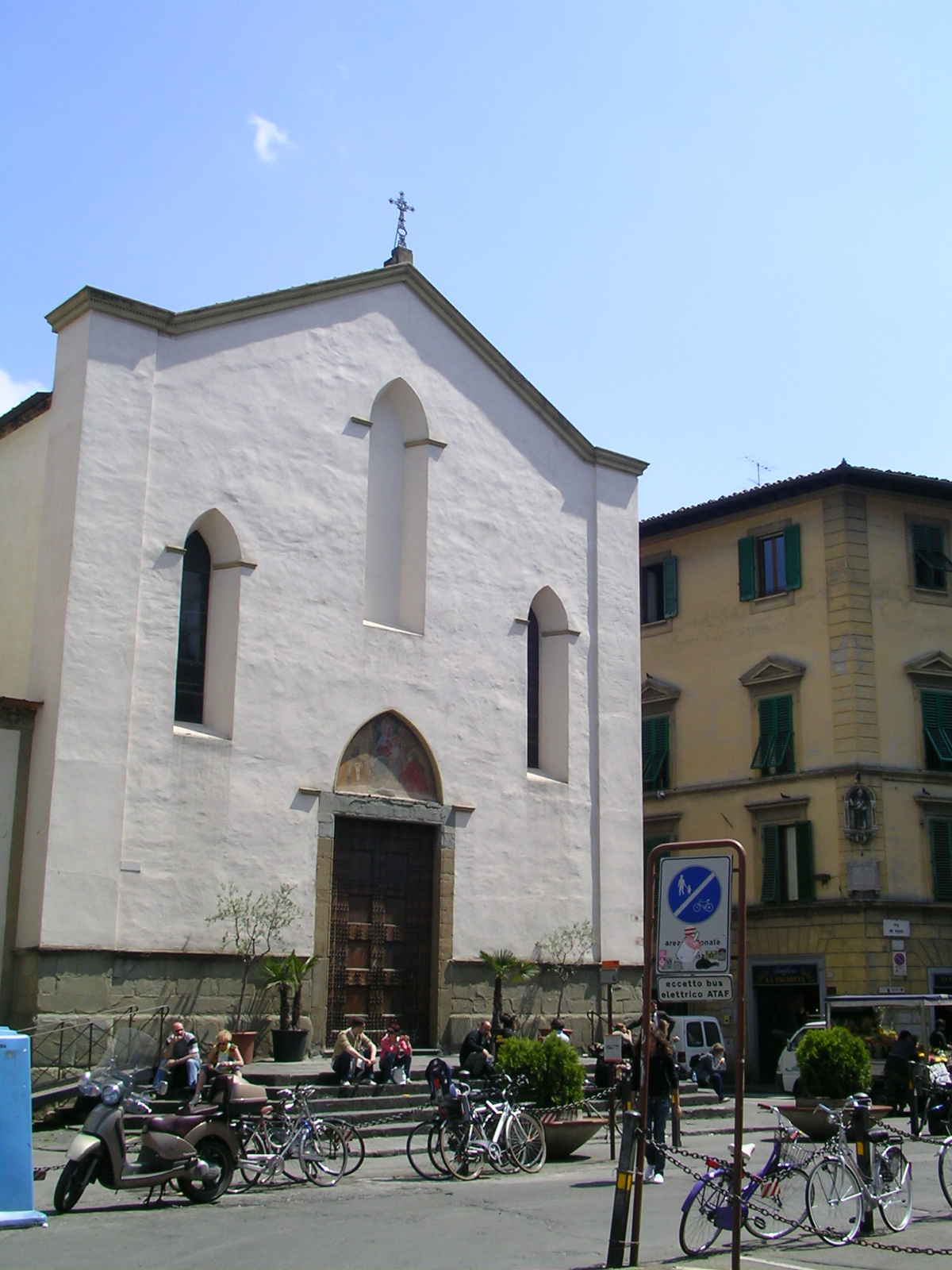
- The façade of Sant'Ambrogio

Religion
- Affiliation: Roman Catholic
- Province: Florence

Location
- Location: Florence, Italy
- Interactive map of Church of Sant'Ambrogio (Chiesa di Sant'Ambrogio)

Architecture
- Type: Church

Sant'Ambrogio is a Roman Catholic church in Florence, Tuscany, Italy. It is named in honour of St Ambrose.

== History ==
Allegedly built where Saint Ambrose would have stayed when in Florence in 393, the church is first recorded in 998, but is probably older. Giovanni Battista Foggini rebuilt the church in the 17th century.

A legend says that on 30 December 1230, a chalice, which had not been cleaned, was found the next day to contain blood rather than wine by Uguccione, the parish priest. This Eucharistic miracle made the church a place of pilgrimage.

Francesco Granacci (1469–1543), an Italian painter of the Renaissance and lifelong friend of Michelangelo Buonarroti, is buried in this church.

== Art ==
The church contains numerous frescos, altarpieces, and other artwork attributed to Andrea Orcagna, Agnolo Gaddi, Niccolò Gerini, Lorenzo di Bicci, Masaccio, Filippo Lippi, Sandro Botticelli, Alesso Baldovinetti, Fra Bartolomeo, and Leonardo Tassini.

Mino da Fiesole designed a marble altar in the Chapel of the Misericordia; the same chapel has a fresco (1476) depicting events surrounding the miracle of the cup of wine by Cosimo Roselli.

Filippo Lippi's Incoronation of the Virgin, executed for the church's main altar in 1441–1447, is now at the Uffizi.

== Sources ==
- Cesati, Franco (2002). Le chiese di Firenze. Rome: Newton Compton.
