= Filippo Lippi =

Italian Renaissance painter (c. 1406–1469)

Fra' Filippo Lippi O.Carm.
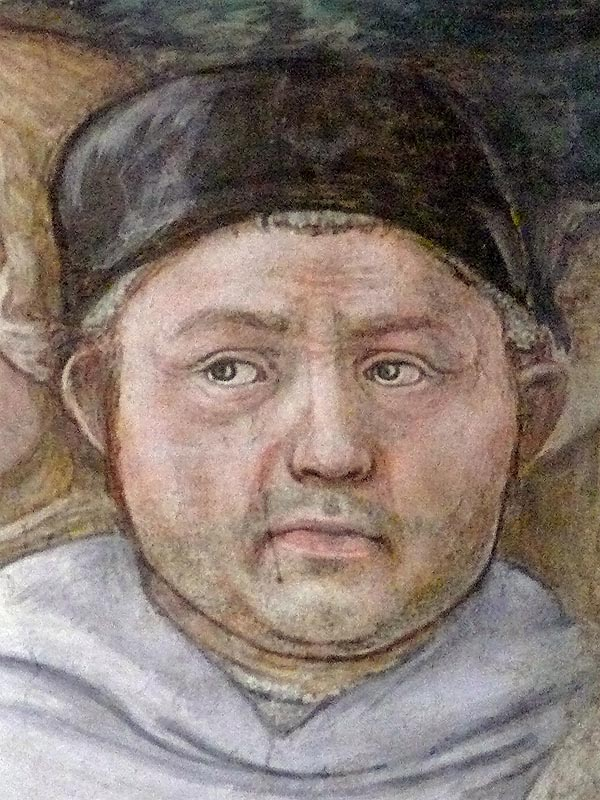
- Self-portrait of Fra' Filippo Lippi (1452)
- Born: Filippo Lippi c. 1406; Florence, Republic of Florence
- Died: 8 October 1469 (aged 62–63); Spoleto, Papal States
- Other name: Lippo Lippi
- Known for: Painting, fresco innovative naturalism
- Notable work: Madonna and Child Enthroned, Annunciation
- Movement: Early Renaissance

Filippo Lippi O.Carm. (c. 1406 – 8 October 1469), also known as Lippo Lippi, was an Italian Renaissance painter of the Quattrocento (fifteenth century) and a Carmelite priest. He was an early Renaissance master of a painting workshop, who taught many painters. Sandro Botticelli and Francesco di Pesello (called Pesellino) were among his most distinguished pupils. His son, Filippino Lippi, also studied under him and assisted in some late works.

== Biography ==
Lippi was born in Florence in 1406 to Tommaso, a butcher, and his wife. He was orphaned when he was two years old and sent to live with his aunt, Mona Lapaccia. Because she was too poor to rear him, she placed him in the neighboring Carmelite convent when he was eight years old. There, he started his education. In 1420, he was admitted to the novitiate of the Order of the Brothers of the Blessed Virgin Mary of Mount Carmel, known commonly as the Carmelites, at the priory of Santa Maria del Carmine in Florence, taking religious vows in the Order the following year, at the age of sixteen. He was ordained as a priest in approximately 1425 and remained in residence at the priory until 1432.

Giorgio Vasari, the first art historian of the Renaissance, writes in his Lives of the Artists that "while he was in his noviciate and under the discipline of the grammar master, did nothing but cover his books with drawings of figures, until at last the prior determined to give him every help in learning to paint. The [Brancacci] chapel in the [church of Santa Maria del] Carmine had been recently painted by Masaccio, and being most beautiful, pleased Fra Filippo greatly, and he used to go there." Later "he painted a pope confirming the rule of the Carmelites and other pictures so much in Masaccio's style that many said that the spirit of Masaccio had entered into Fra Filippo. Lippi's early work indeed, notably the Tarquinia Madonna (Palazzo Barberini, Rome) shows the influence of Masaccio.

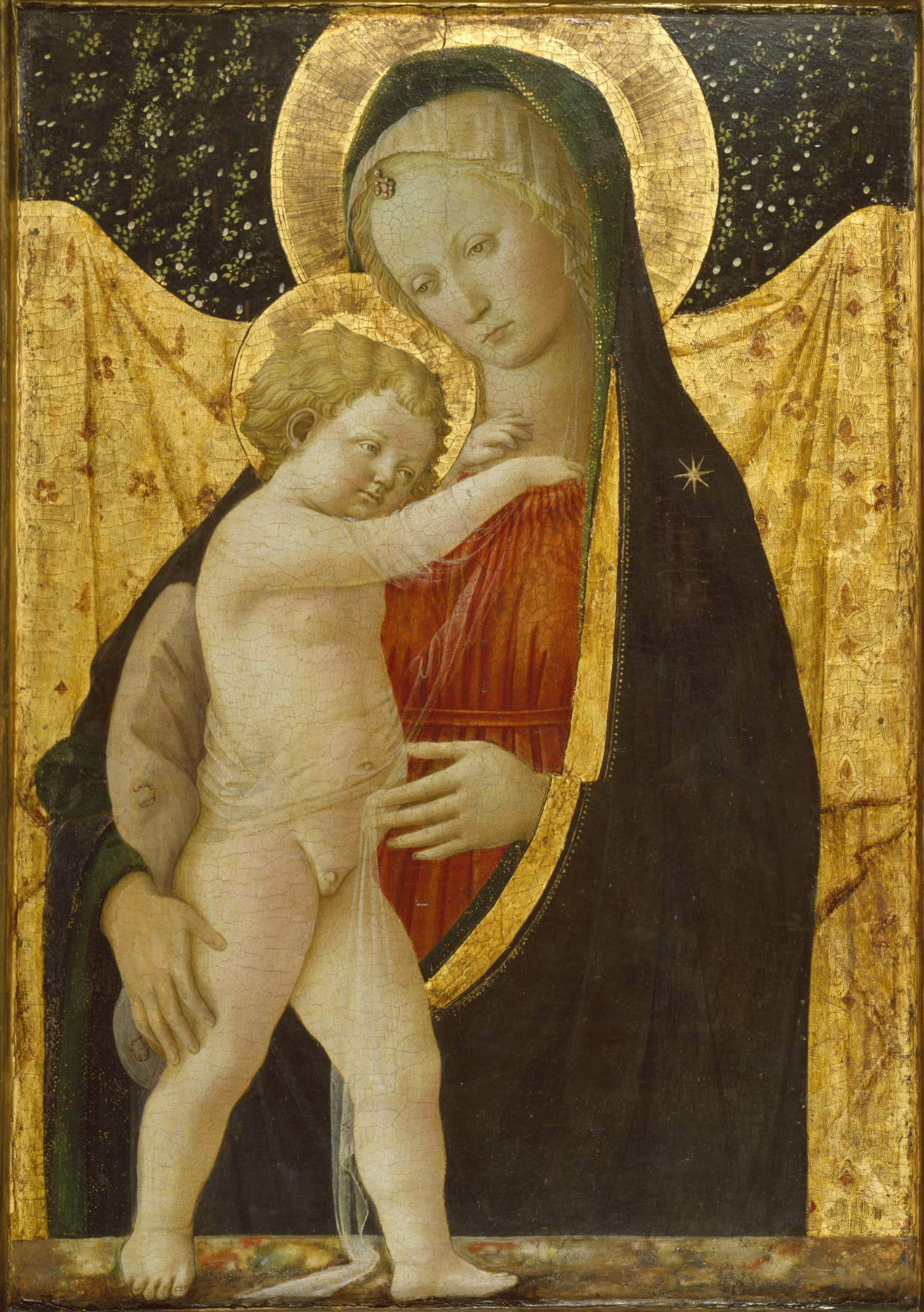
Devotional image of the Madonna and Child before a golden curtain, the Workshop of Filippo Lippi (c. 1446–1447), Walters Art Museum

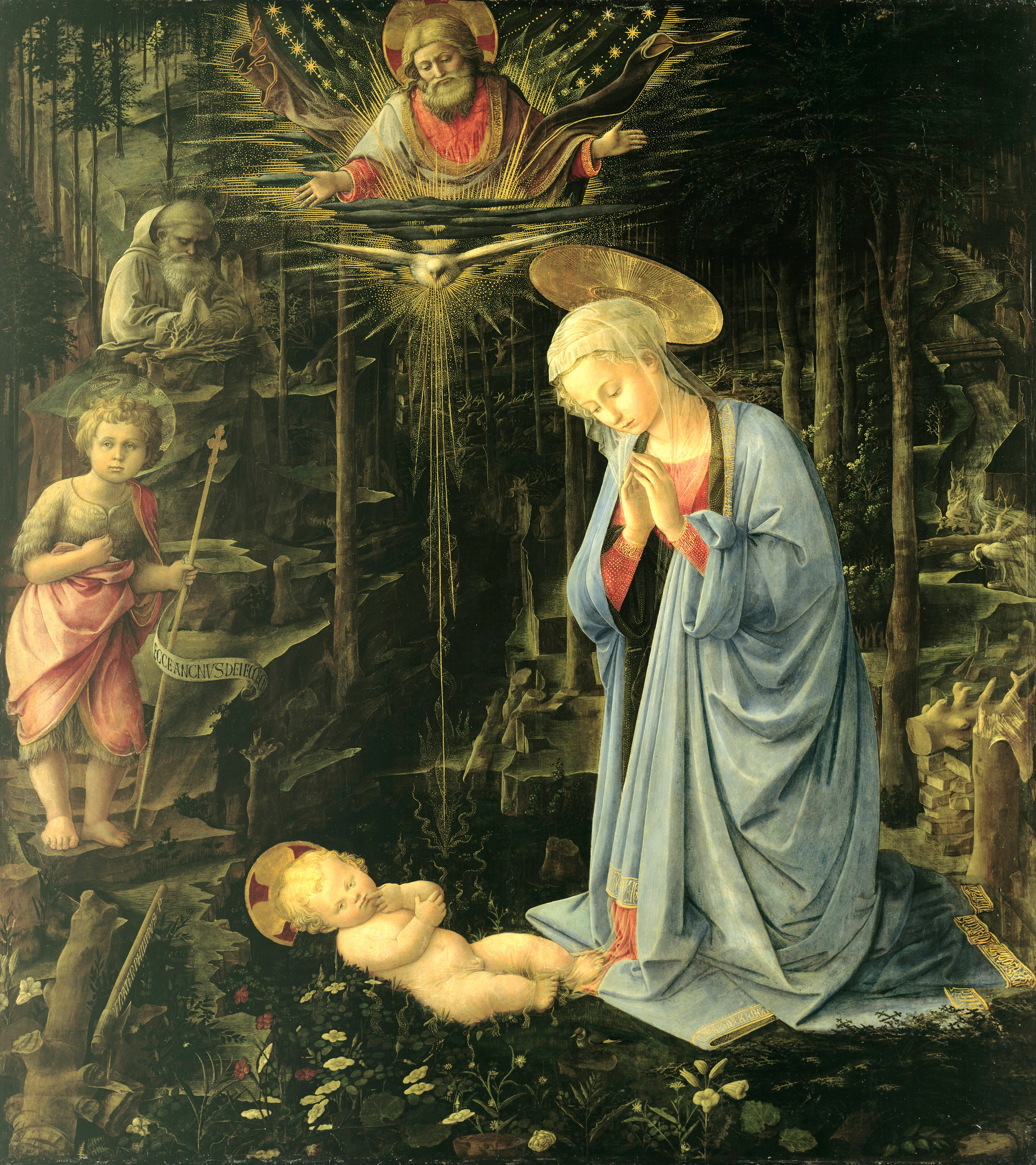
Adoration in the Forest (1459), Gemäldegalerie Berlin

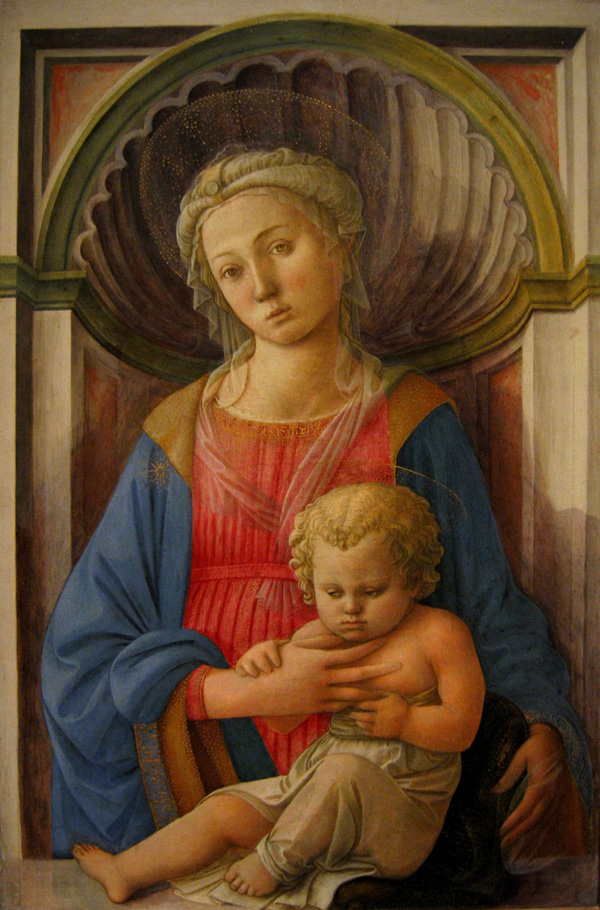
Madonna and Child (1440–1445), tempera on panel, National Gallery of Art, Washington, D.C.

In 1432, Filippo Lippi quit the monastery, although he was not released from his vows. In a letter dated 1439 he describes himself as the poorest friar of Florence, charged with the maintenance of six marriageable nieces.

According to Vasari, Lippi then went on to visit Ancona and Naples, where he was captured by Barbary pirates and kept as a slave. Reportedly, his skill in portrait-sketching helped to eventually release him. Louis Gillet, writing for the Catholic Encyclopedia, considers this account and other details reported about Lippi, as "assuredly nothing but a romance".

With Lippi's return to Florence in 1432, his paintings had become popular, warranting the support of the Medici family, who commissioned the Annunciation and the Seven Saints. Cosimo de' Medici had to imprison him in order to compel him to work, and even then the painter escaped by a rope made of his sheets. His escapades threw him into financial difficulties from which he did not hesitate to extricate himself by forgery. His life included many similar tales of lawsuits, complaints, broken promises, and scandal.

In 1441, Lippi painted the altarpiece of the Coronation of the Virgin for the nuns of Sant'Ambrogio. The painting shows the Virgin being crowned among angels and saints, including many Bernardine monks. One of these, placed to the right, is a half-length figure originally thought to be a self-portrait of Lippi, pointed out by the inscription is perfecit opus upon an angel's scroll. Later, it was believed instead to be a portrait of the benefactor who commissioned the painting. The painting was celebrated in Robert Browning's poem "Fra Lippo Lippi" (1855).

In 1452, Lippi was appointed chaplain to the nuns at the Monastery of Santa Maria Maddalena in Florence.

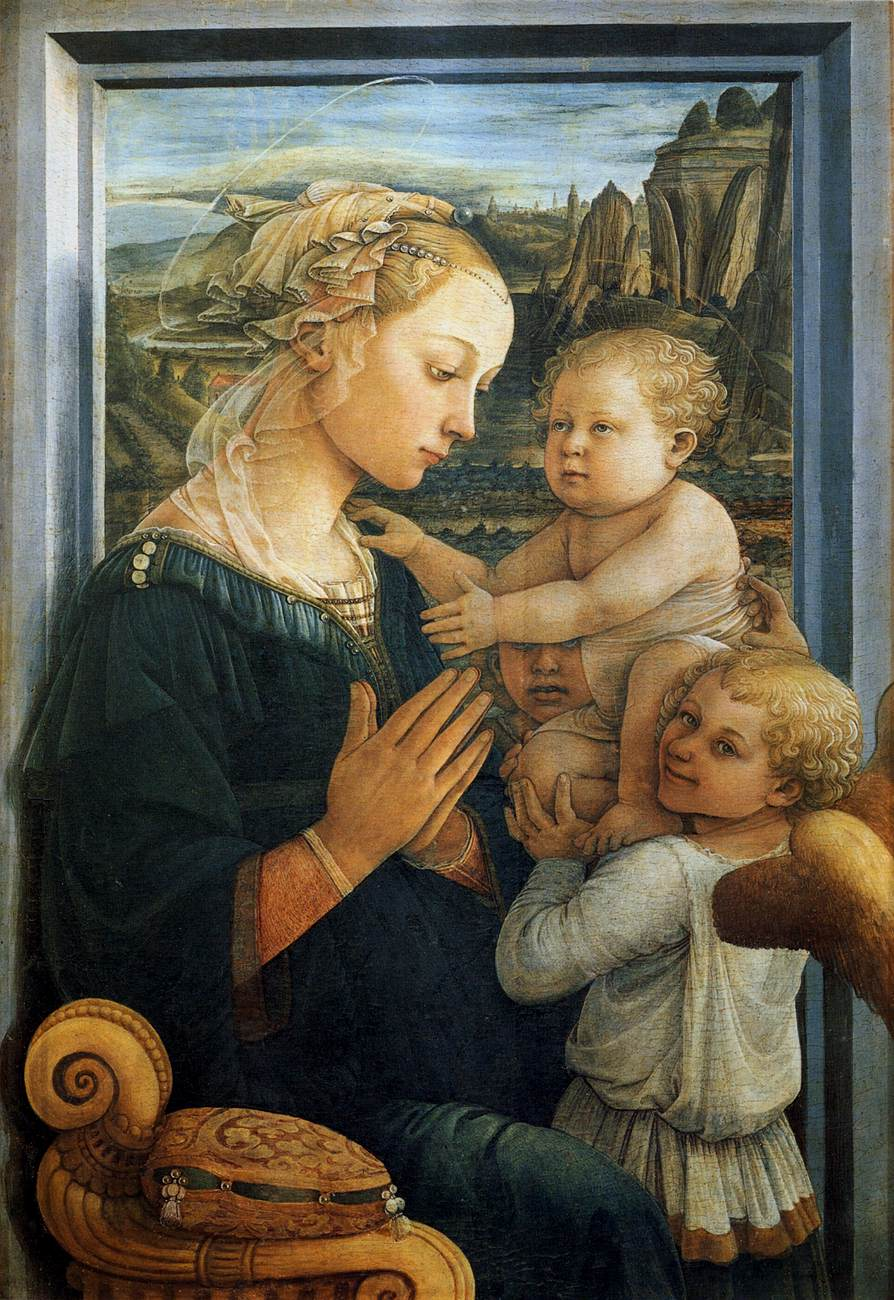
Madonna with the Child and Two Angels (1465), tempera on wood, Uffizi, Florence (also called "Lippina"; Lucrezia Buti is thought to be the model)

Fra Filippo is recorded as living in Prato (near Florence) in June 1456 to paint frescoes in the choir of the cathedral. In 1458, while engaged in this work, he set about creating a painting for the monastery chapel of Santa Margherita in that city, where he met Lucrezia Buti, a beautiful boarder or novice of the Order and the daughter of the Florentines Caterina Ciacchi and Francesco Buti. Lippi asked that she might be permitted to sit for the figure of the Madonna (or perhaps Saint Margaret). Lippi engaged in sexual relations with her and abducted her to his own house. She remained there despite efforts by the nuns to reclaim her. This relationship resulted in their son Filippino Lippi in 1457, who became a famous painter following his father, as well as a daughter, Alessandra, in 1465. Lucrezia is thought to be the model for many of Filippo Lippi's paintings of the Madonna, as well as for Salome in one of his monumental works.

In 1457, he was appointed commendatory Rector (Rettore commendatario) of San Quirico in Legnaia, from which institutions he occasionally made considerable profits. Despite these profits, Lippi struggled to escape poverty throughout his life.

The close of Lippi's life was spent at Spoleto, where he had been commissioned to paint scenes from the Life of the Virgin for the apse of the cathedral. His son, Filippino, served as workshop adjuvant in the construction. In the semidome of the apse is the Coronation of the Virgin, with angels, sibyls, and prophets. This series, which is not wholly equal to the one at Prato, was completed after Lippi's death by assistants under his fellow Carmelite, Fra Diamante.

Lippi died in Spoleto, on or about 8 October 1469. The mode of his death is a matter of dispute. It has been said that the pope granted Lippi a dispensation to marry Lucrezia, but before the permission arrived Lippi had been poisoned by indignant relatives of Lucrezia or, in another version, by relatives of someone who had replaced her in the painter's affections.

== Works ==
The frescoes in the choir of the cathedral of Prato, which depict the stories of Saint Stephen and Saint John the Baptist on the two main facing walls, are considered Fra Filippo's most important and monumental works, particularly the figure of Salome dancing, which has clear affinities with later works by Sandro Botticelli, his pupil, and Filippino Lippi, his son, as well as the scene showing the ceremonial mourning over Stephen's corpse. This latter is believed to contain a portrait of the painter, but there are various opinions as to which is the exact figure. The figure of the dancing Salome in the scene of the Feast of Herod is believed to be a portrait of Lucrezia. On the end wall of the choir are Saint John Gualbert and Saint Alberto, while the vault has monumental representations of the four evangelists.

For Germiniano Inghirami of Prato he painted the Death of Saint Bernard. His principal altarpiece in this city is a Nativity in the refectory of San Domenico: the Christ child on the ground adored by the Virgin and Joseph, between Saints George and Dominic, in a rocky landscape, with the shepherds playing and six angels in the sky. A Vision of Saint Bernard is held in the National Gallery, London.

In the Uffizi is a fine painting of the Virgin, also called "Lippina", adoring the infant Christ, who is held by two angels. The model for the Virgin is Lucrezia. A sometime lecturer at the gallery, the art historian Rocky Ruggiero identifies the painting as "one of the most beautiful paintings of the Italian Renaissance" and asserts that arguably, Lippi "is the first Italian painter with a true sensibility for feminine beauty".

The painting of the Virgin and Child with an Angel also in the Uffizi is ascribed to Lippi, but that is disputed.

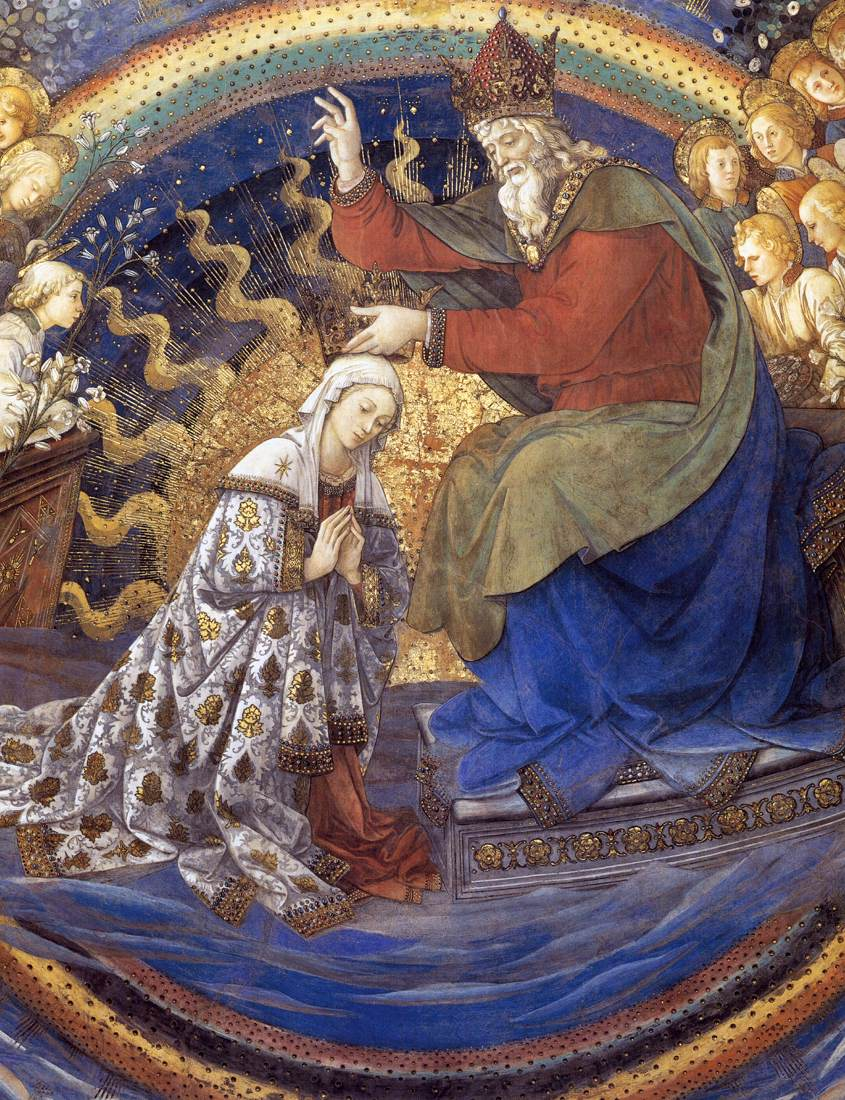
Detail of the Spoleto Coronation of the Virgin (c. 1469), fresco, semidome of the apse of Spoleto Cathedral

Filippo Lippi died in 1469 while working on the frescoes of scenes from the Life of the Virgin (1467–1469) in the apse of Spoleto Cathedral. The frescoes show the Annunciation, the Funeral of the Virgin, the Adoration of the Christ Child, and the Coronation of the Virgin. A group of bystanders depicted at the funeral includes a self-portrait of Lippi and his helpers, Fra Diamante and Pier Matteo d'Amelia, together with his son Filippino. Lippi was buried on the right side of the transept, with a monument commissioned by Lorenzo de' Medici.

Francesco di Pesello (called Pesellino) and Sandro Botticelli were among his most distinguished pupils who participated in his workshop.

== Selected works ==
- Enthroned Madonna and Child (Madonna of Tarquinia) (1437) – Tempera on panel, 151 × 66 cm, Galleria Nazionale d'Arte Antica, Rome
- Pietà (1437–1439) – Tempera on panel, 86 × 107 cm, Museo Poldi Pezzoli, Milan
- Madonna and Child with Saints (1438) – Panel, 208 × 244 cm, Louvre, Paris
- Penitent Saint Jerome with a Young Monk (c. 1439) – Tempera on panel, 54 × 37 cm, Lindenau Museum, Altenburg
- The Annunciation with two Kneeling Donors (c. 1440) – Oil on panel, 155 × 144 cm, Galleria Nazionale d'Arte Antica, Rome
- Martelli Annunciation (c. 1440) – Tempera on panel, 175 × 183 cm, San Lorenzo, Florence
- Novitiate Altarpiece (c. 1440-1445) – Tempera on panel, 196 × 196 cm, Uffizi, Florence
- Coronation of the Virgin Sant'Ambrogio (1441–1447) – Tempera on panel, 200 × 287 cm, Uffizi, Florence
- Annunciation (c. 1443–1450) – Wood, 203 × 185.3 cm, Alte Pinakothek, Munich
- Marsuppini Coronation (after 1444) – Tempera on panel, 172 × 251 cm, Pinacoteca Vaticana, Rome
- Annunciation (1445–50) – Oil on panel, 117 × 173 cm, Galleria Doria Pamphilj, Rome
- Annunciation (c. 1449–1459) – Tempera on panel, 68 × 151.5 cm, National Gallery, London
- Seven Saints (c. 1449–1459) – Tempera on panel, 68 × 151.5 cm, National Gallery, London
- Madonna and Child (c. 1452) – Panel, diameter 135 cm, Palazzo Pitti, Florence
- Funeral of Saint Jerome (c. 1452–1460) – Tempera on panel, 268 × 165 cm, Museo dell'Opera del Duomo, Prato Cathedral
- Stories of Saint Stephen and Saint John the Baptist (1452-1465) – Fresco cycle, Cathedral of Prato
- Madonna del Ceppo (c. 1452–1453) – Panel, 187 × 120 cm, Civic Museum, Prato
- Madonna and Child (c. 1455) – Panel, Uffizi, Florence
- Adoration in the Forest (late 1450s) – Panel, 127 × 116 cm, Staatliche Museen, Gemäldegalerie Berlin
- Madonna of Palazzo Medici-Riccardi (1466–1469) – Tempera on panel, 115 × 71 cm, Palazzo Medici-Riccardi, Florence
- Life of the Virgin (1467–1469) – Fresco, apse of Spoleto Cathedral
- Madonna and Child (between circa 1446 and 1447), Walters Art Museum
- Triptych of the Madonna of Humility with Saints (late 1420s), Fitzwilliam Museum, Cambridge

== Gallery ==
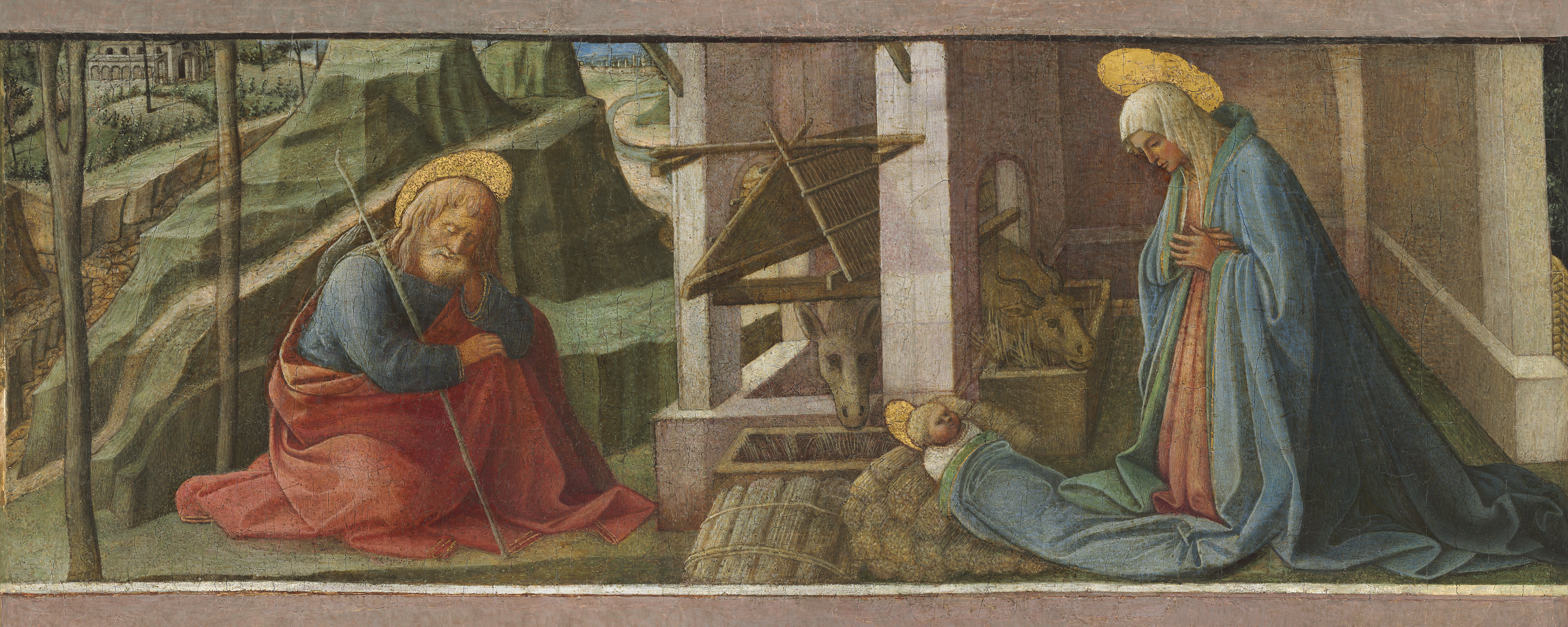
The Nativity (c. 1445), National Gallery of Art, Washington D.C.

The Adoration of the Magi, tondo credited to Fra Angelico and Filippo Lippi (c. 1440–1460), National Gallery of Art, Washington D.C.

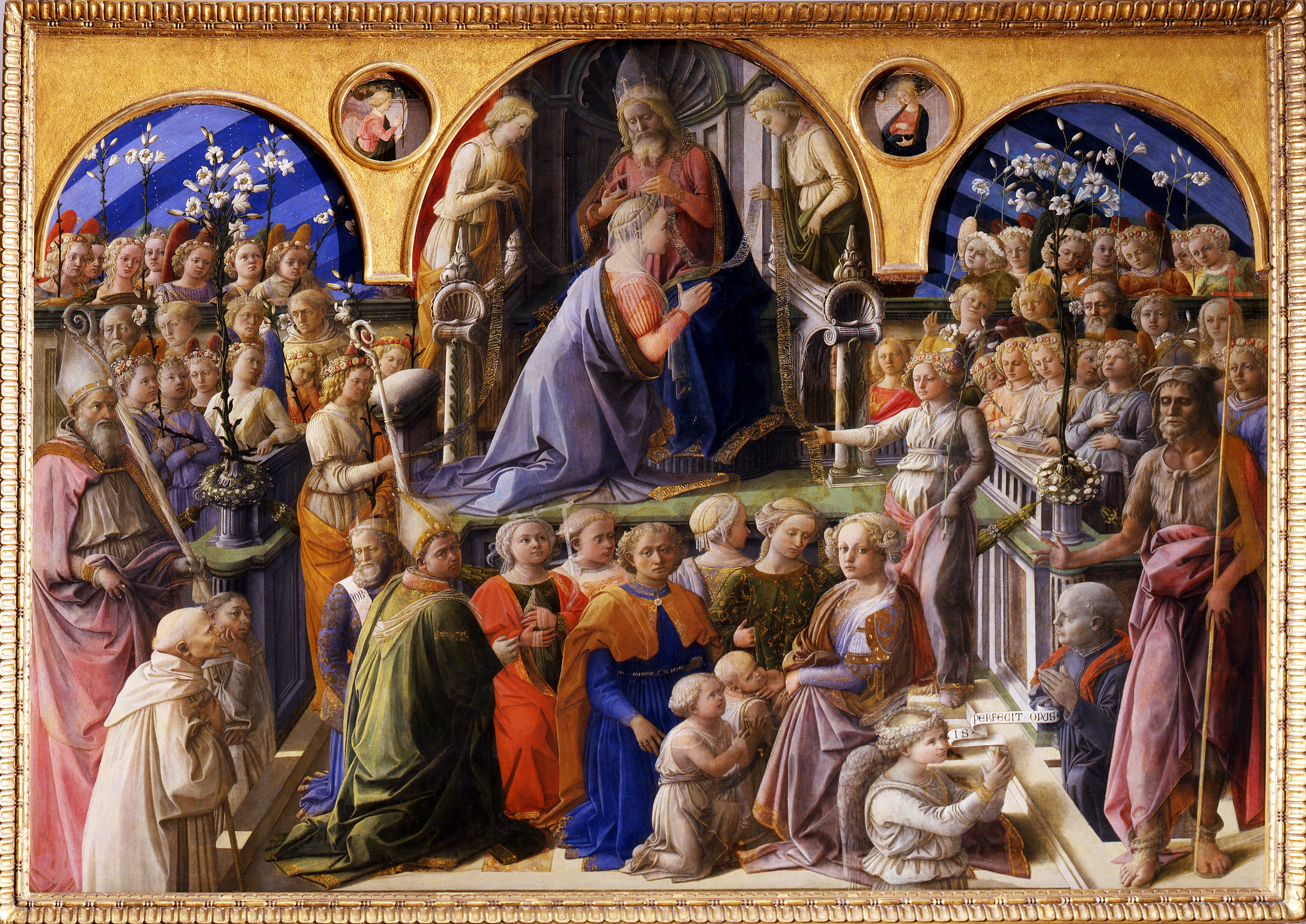
Coronation of the Virgin (1441–1447), Uffizi Florence

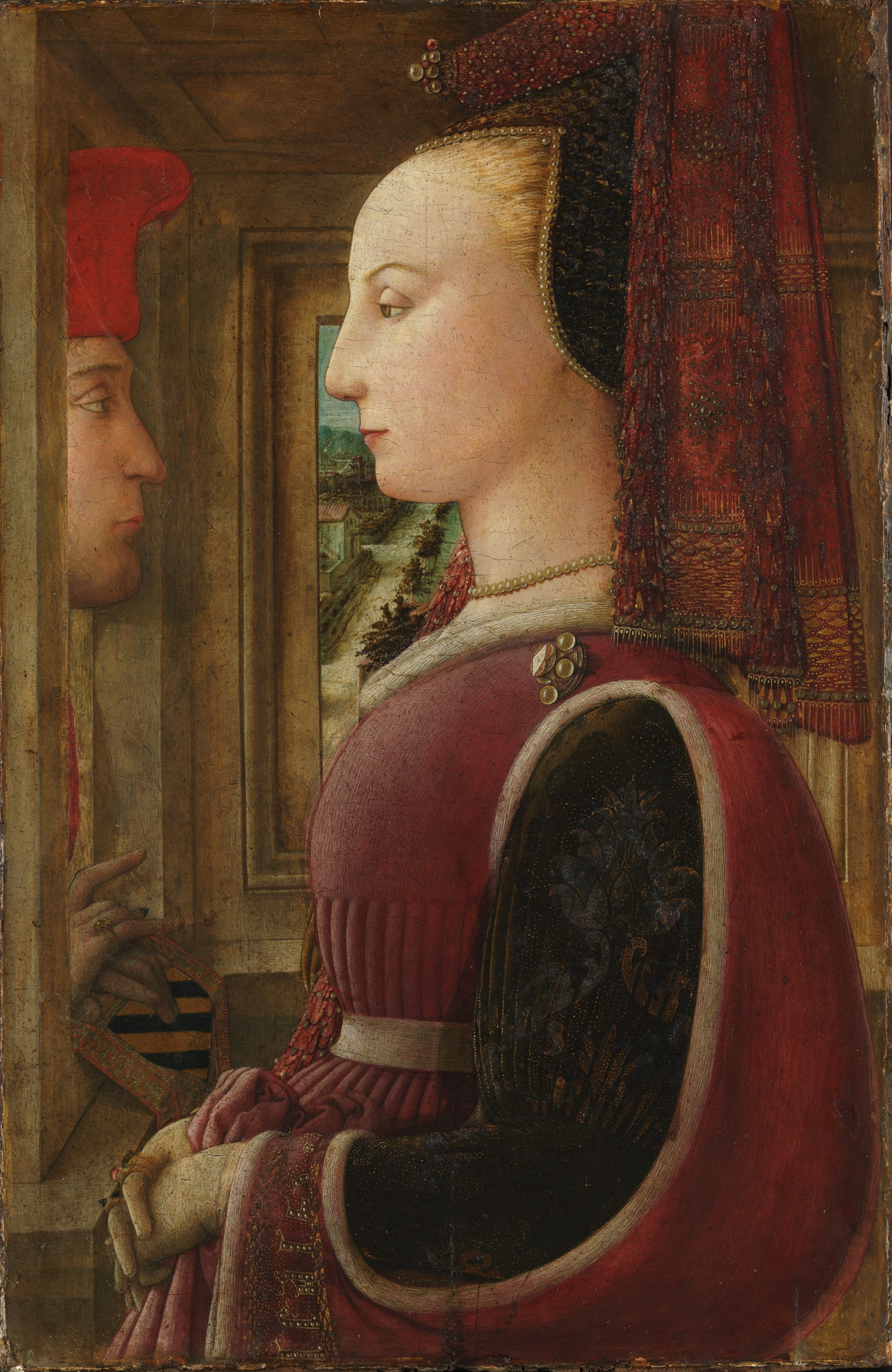
Portrait of a Woman with a Man at a Casement (c. 1440), Metropolitan Museum of Art, New York City

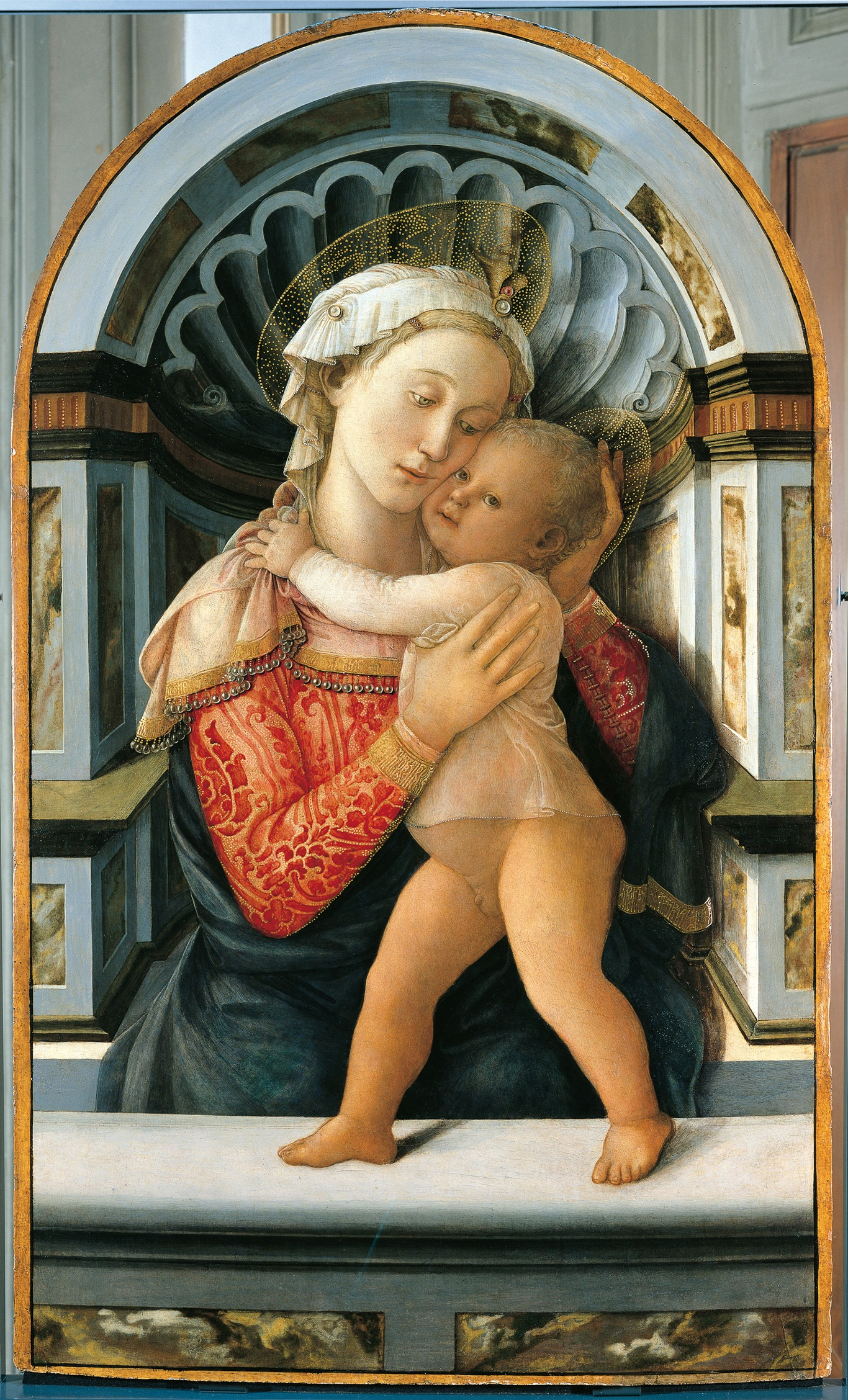
Madonna of Palazzo Medici-Riccardi (1466), Palazzo Medici-Riccardi, Florence

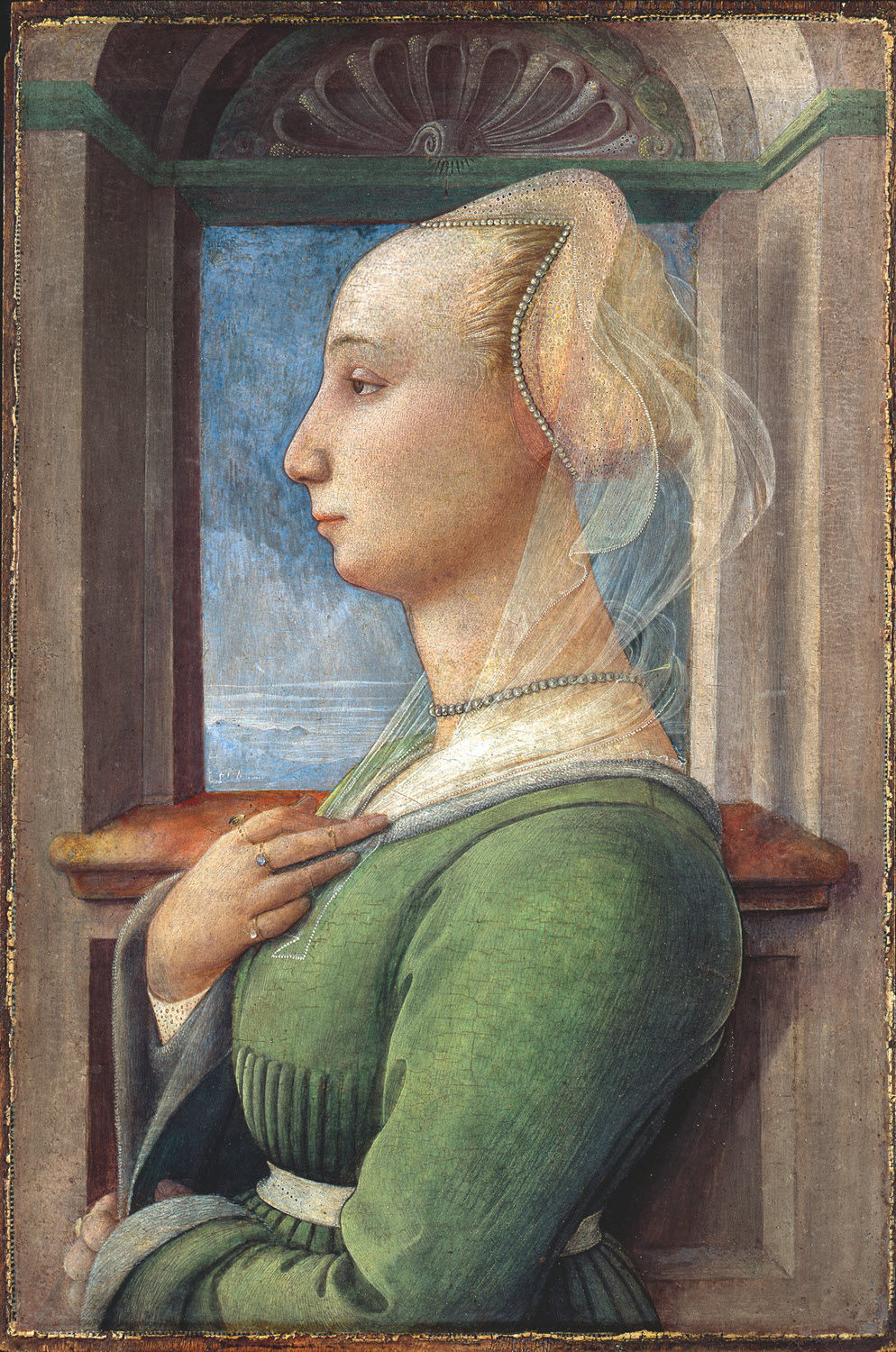
Portrait of a Woman (1445), Gemäldegalerie, Berlin

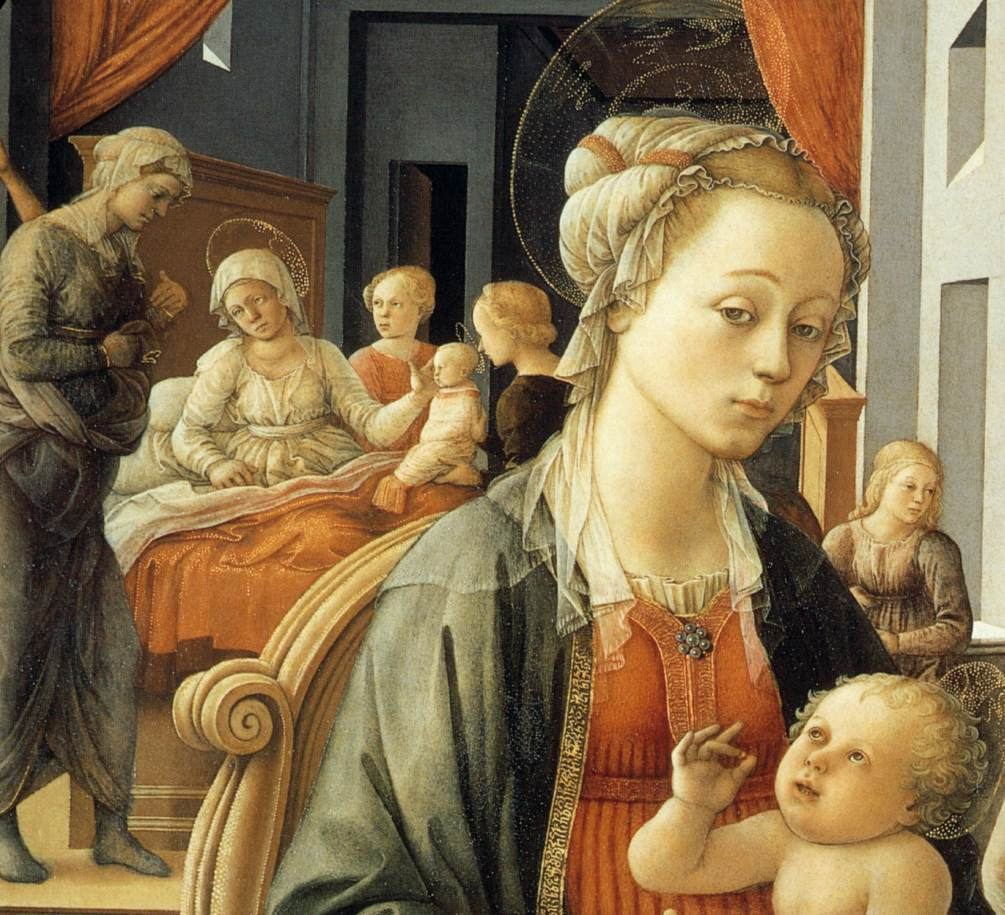
Madonna with Child with scenes of life of Saint Anne (1452), detail, Palazzo Pitti, Florence

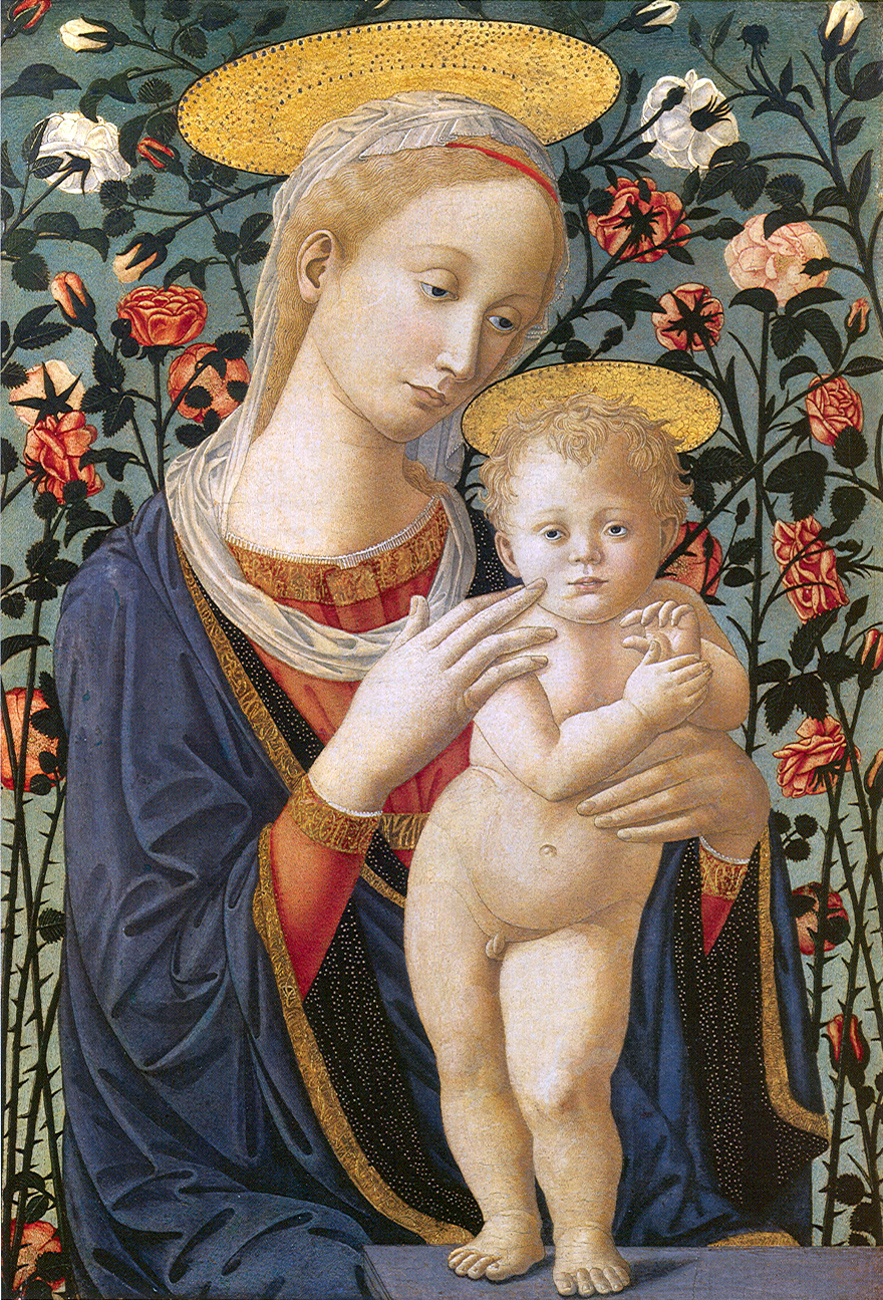
Madonna and Child by a Follower of Fra Filippo Lippi and Francesco Pesellino, National Gallery of Art, Washington D.C.
