= Spoleto Cathedral =

Church building in Spoleto, Italy

Spoleto Cathedral Cattedrale di Santa Maria Assunta
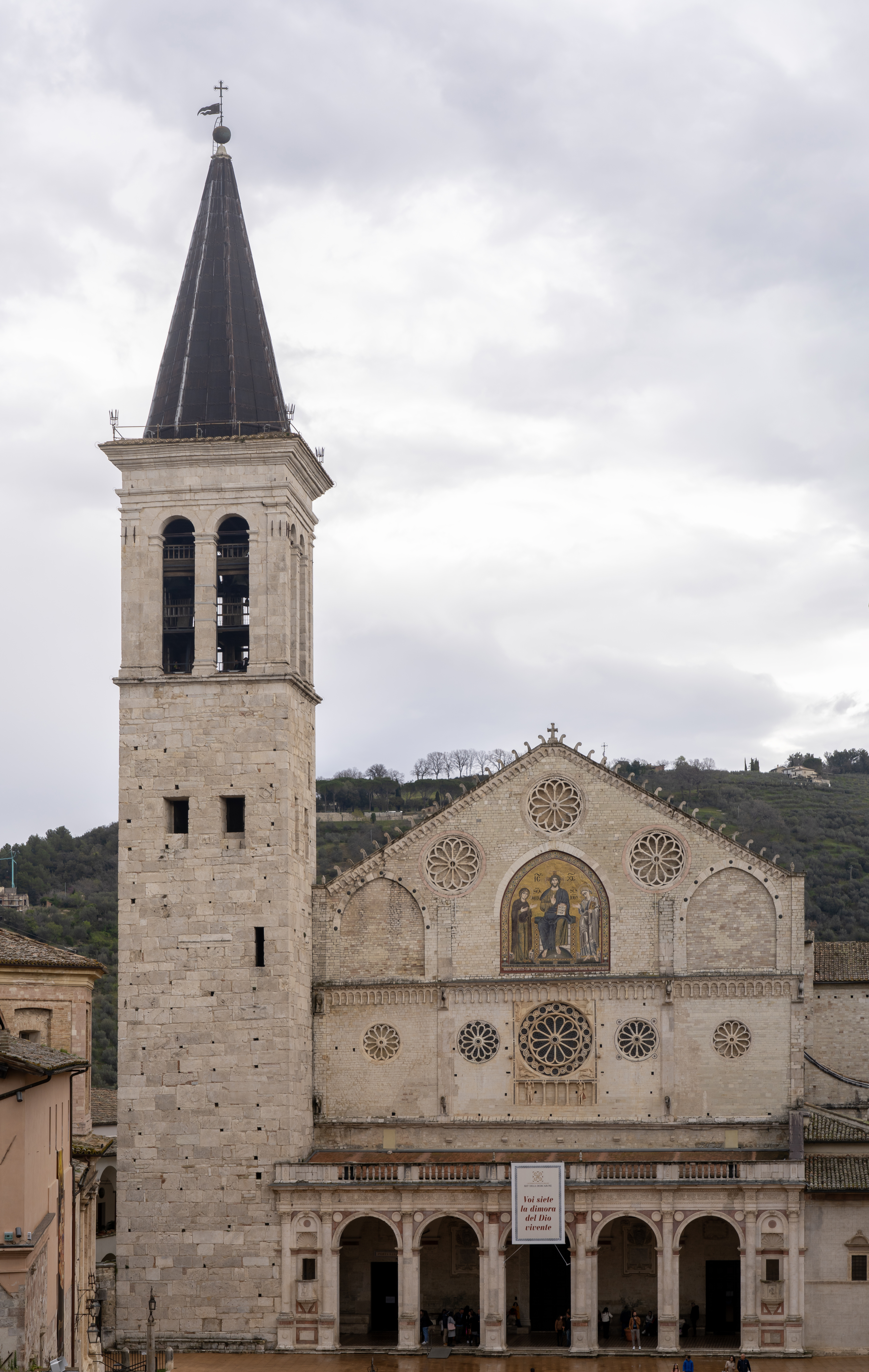
- West front of Spoleto Cathedral

Religion
- Affiliation: Roman Catholic
- Diocese: Archdiocese of Spoleto-Norcia
- Rite: Roman
- Ecclesiastical or organizational status: Cathedral

Location
- Location: Spoleto, Italy
- Interactive map of Spoleto Cathedral; Cattedrale di Santa Maria Assunta
- Coordinates: 42°44′07″N 12°44′26″E

Architecture
- Type: Church
- Style: Romanesque

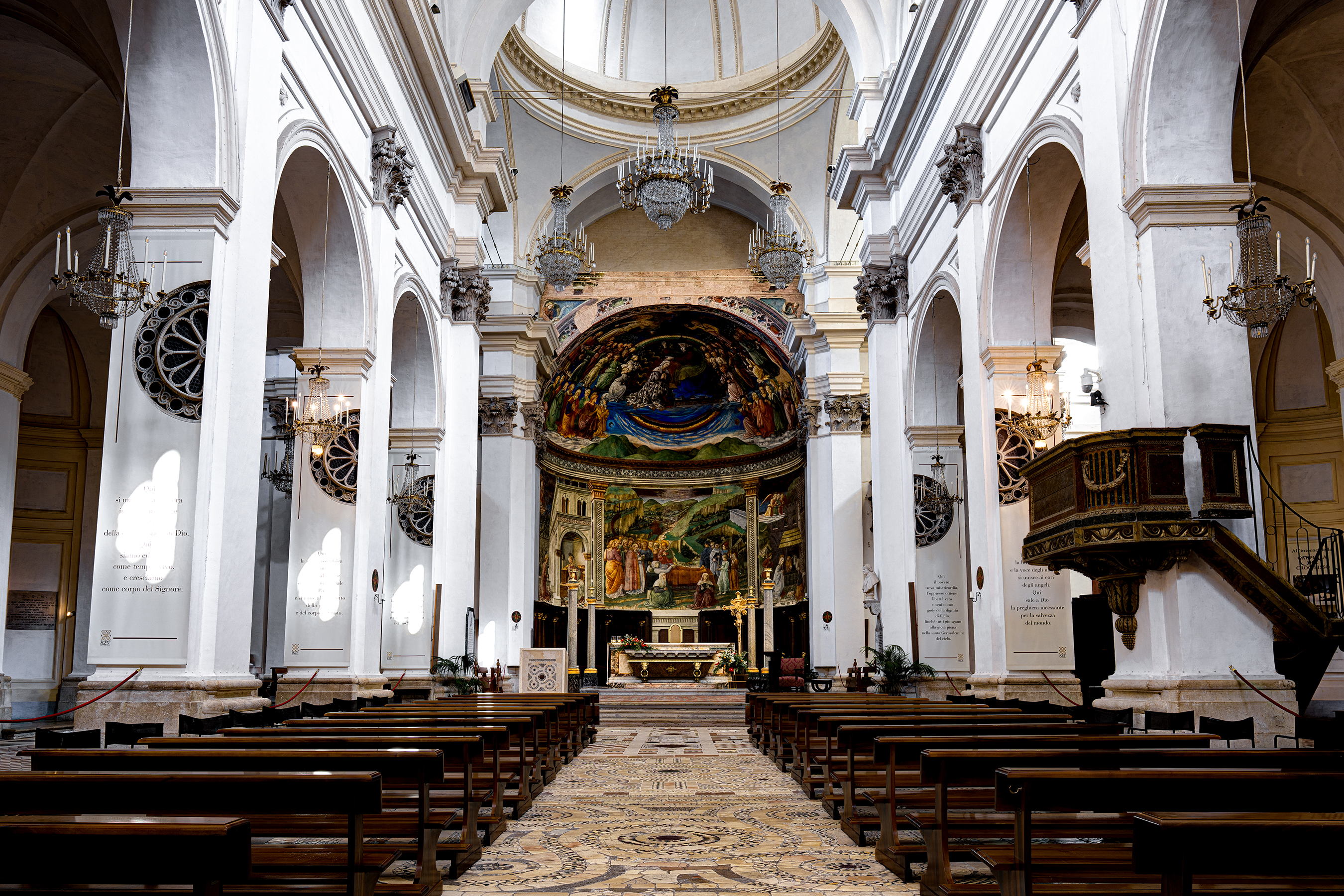
Interior of Spoleto Cathedral

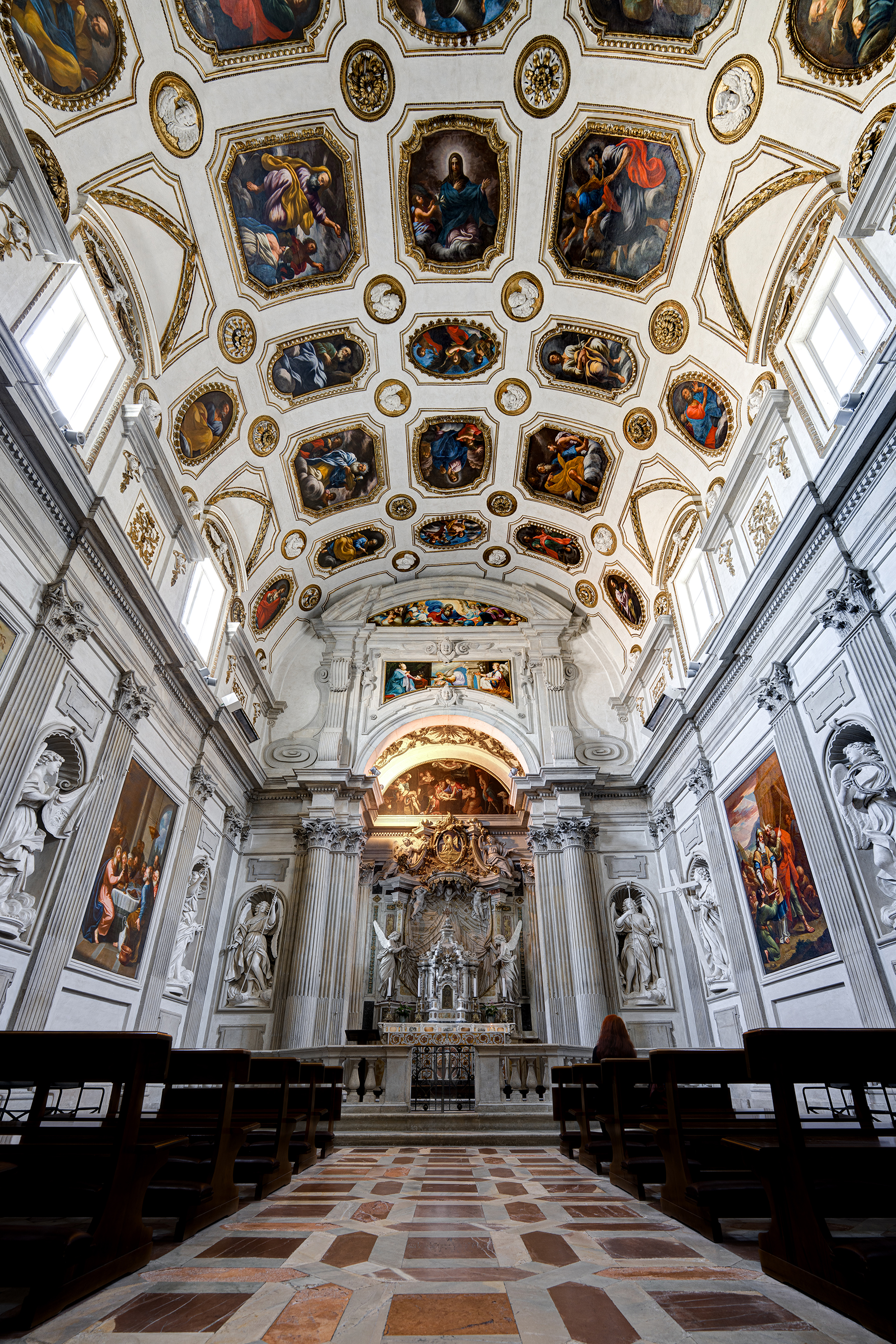
Interior of Chapel of the Blessed Sacrament, Spoleto Cathedral

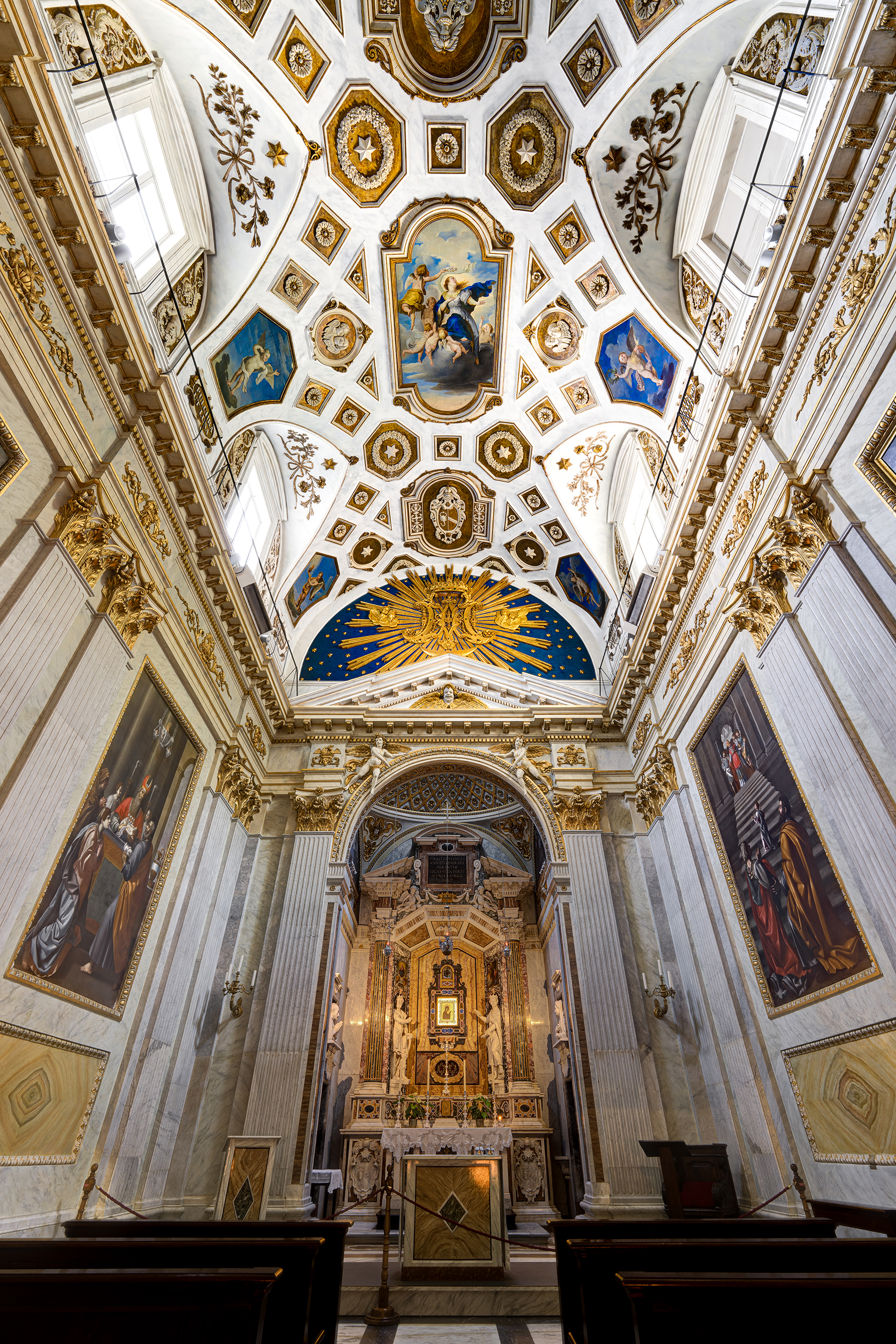
Interior of Chapel of the Holy Icon, Spoleto Cathedral

Spoleto Cathedral (Italian: Cattedrale di Santa Maria Assunta; Duomo di Spoleto) is the cathedral of the Archdiocese of Spoleto-Norcia created in 1821, previously that of the diocese of Spoleto, and the principal church of the Umbrian city of Spoleto, in Italy. It is dedicated to the Assumption of the Blessed Virgin Mary.

The church is essentially an example of Romanesque architecture, with a nave and two side-aisles crossed by a transept, although subsequently modified. It was built from the second half of the twelfth century after the city had been devastated by Frederick Barbarossa's troops, over an area where there had previously stood an earlier cathedral, dedicated to Saint Primianus (San Primiano) and destroyed by the emperor. A notable external porch and the belfry were added in the fifteenth and sixteenth century respectively.

The façade is divided into three bands. The lower one has a fine architraved door with sculpted door-posts. Two pulpits are provided on each side of the porch. The upper bands are separated by rose windows and ogival arches. The most striking feature of the upper façade is the Byzantine-hieratic mosaic portraying Christ giving a Benediction, signed by one Solsternus (1207). He signed his work with the inscription "Doctor Solsternus, hac summus in arte modernus" (doctor Solsternus, supremely modern in his art ), calling himself an outstanding modern artist. Nothing else is known about him. He was certainly ahead of his contemporaries, because it would take half a century before the mosaics in Roman churches would surpass his style. The part of the belfry contemporary with the church reuses Roman and early medieval elements.

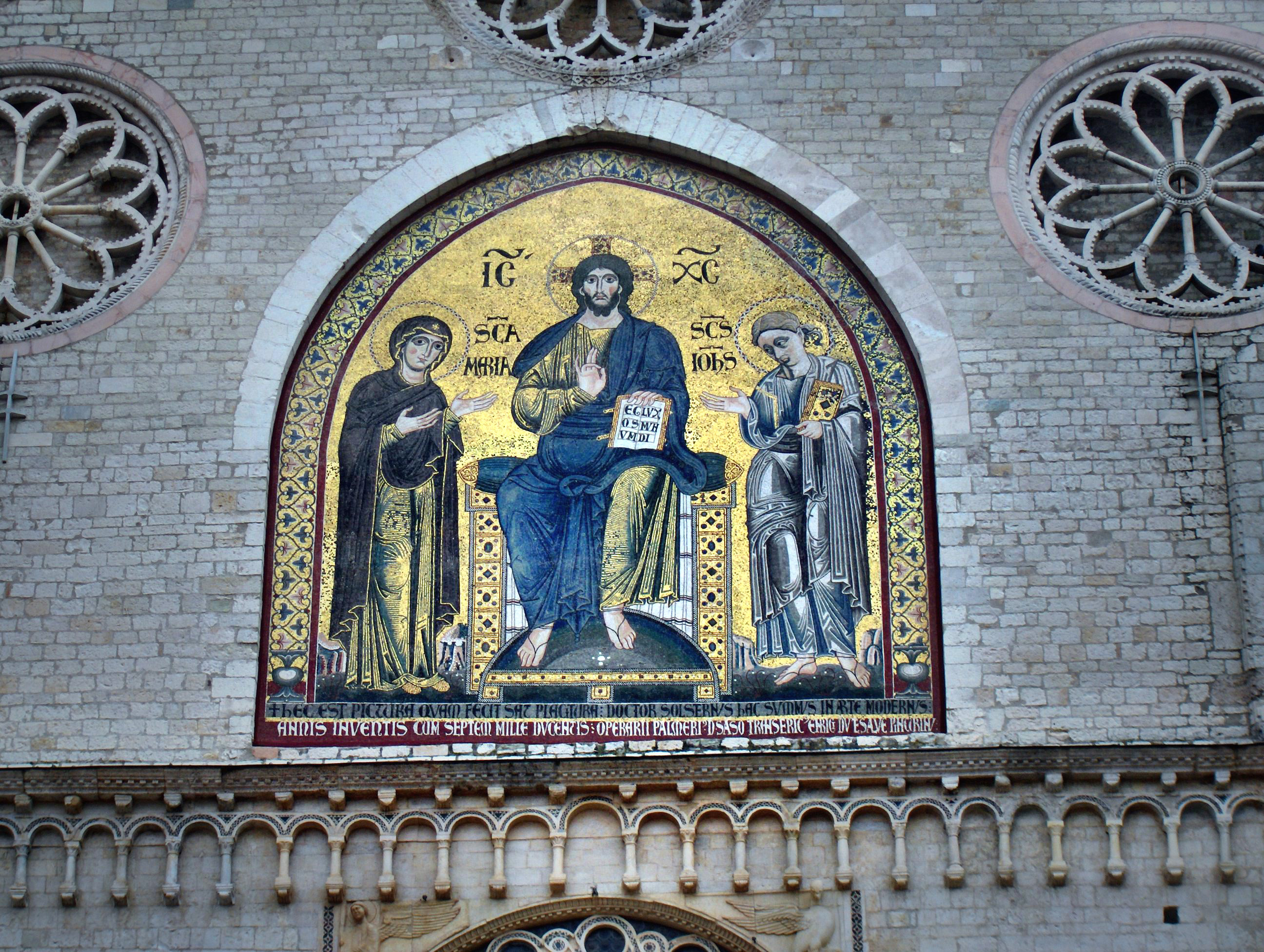
Mosaic "Blessing Christ" (1207) by the Byzantine Solsternus

The interior was significantly modified in the 17th–18th centuries, though it has kept the original Cosmatesque floor of the central nave remains. Another survival is the frescoed apse with four scenes from the Life of the Virgin, begun in 1467 by Filippo Lippi and completed two years later by his pupils Fra' Diamante and Piermatteo Lauro de' Manfredi da Amelia. Lippi is buried in the south arm of the transept.

Also noteworthy are the altar cross by Alberto Sozio, dated 1187, a Byzantine icon donated to the city by Barbarossa as a sign of peace and the frescoes by Pinturicchio in the Chapel of the Bishop of Eroli. Other frescoes from the 16th century are in the next chapel. The church also contains a polychrome wood statue of the Madonna (14th century) and a choir (16th century) with painted altar and tabernacle, in the Chapel of the Relics, under which lies the crypt of the former cathedral of San Primiano.
