= Fra Lippo Lippi (poem) =

1855 poem by Robert Browning

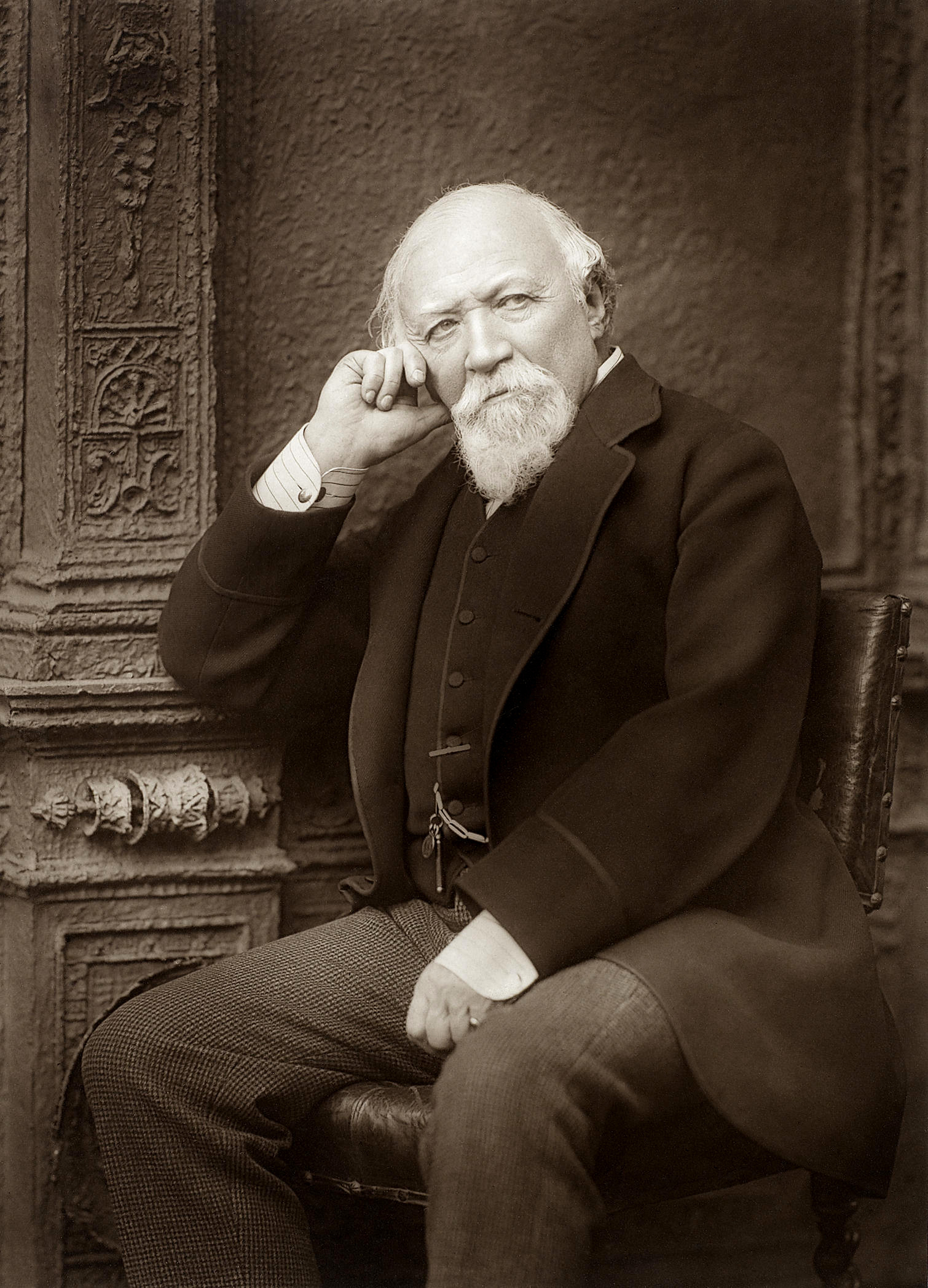
The poet, Robert Browning

"Fra Lippo Lippi" is an 1855 dramatic monologue written by the Victorian poet Robert Browning which first appeared in his collection Men and Women. Throughout this poem, Browning depicts a 15th-century real-life painter, Filippo Lippi. The poem asks the question whether art should be true to life or an idealized image of life. The poem is written in blank verse, non-rhyming iambic pentameter.

A secondary theme of the dramatic monologue is the Church's influence on art. Although Fra Lippo paints real life pictures, it is the Church that requires him to redo much of it, instructing him to paint the soul, not the flesh. ("Paint the soul, never mind the legs and arms!"). Aside from the theme of the Church and its desires to change the way holiness is represented artistically, this poem also attempts to construct a way of considering the secular with the religious in terms of how a "holy" person can conduct his life. Questions of celibacy, church law, and the canon are considered as well by means of secondary characters.
