= Blessed Jacopone da Todi (painting) =

1436 painting by Paolo Uccello

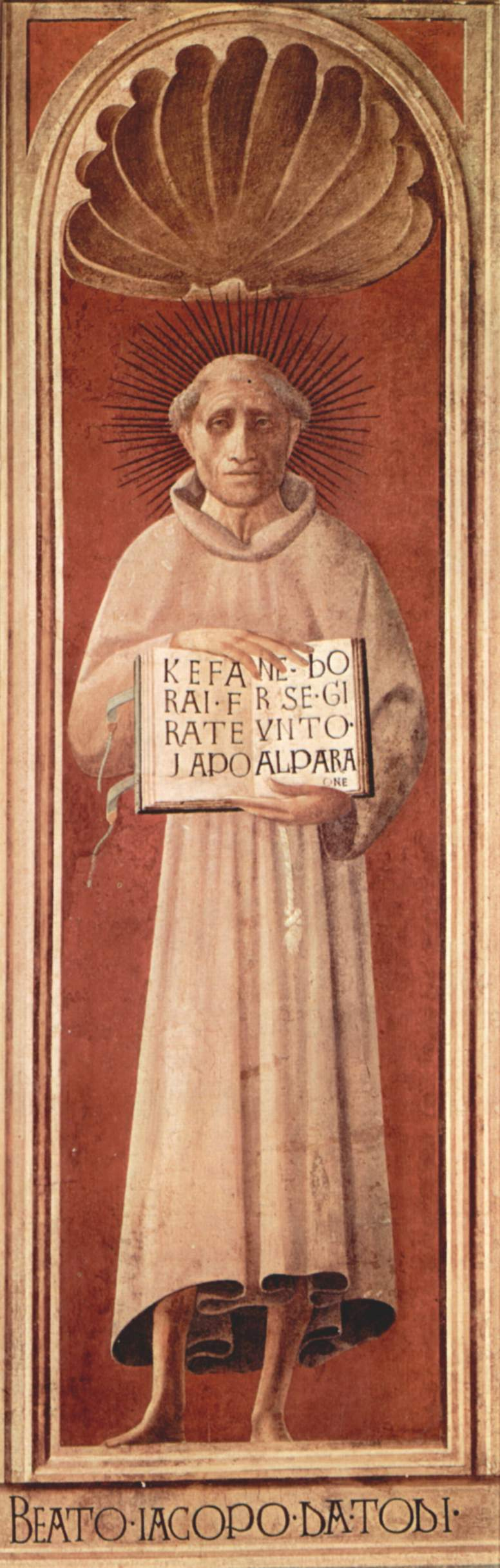
Blessed Jacopone da Todi (c. 1436) by Paolo Uccello

Blessed Jacopone da Todi is a fragment of a fresco by Paolo Uccello, dating to early in 1436. It shows the Franciscan Jacopone da Todi and was originally located to the right of the altar in the Cappella dell'Assunta in Prato Cathedral. In 1967 it was moved to the Museo dell'Opera del Duomo and at the end of the 1990s it was moved to the Museo Civico, where it is displayed in the "I Tesori della città" gallery.

== Bibliography ==
- Annarita Paolieri, Paolo Uccello, Domenico Veneziano, Andrea del Castagno, Scala, Firenze 1991. ISBN 88-8117-017-5
- Alessandro Angelini, Paolo Uccello, il Beato Jacopone da Todi e la datazione degli affreschi di Prato, in "Prospettiva", 61, 1991, pp. 49–53
- Luciano Bellosi, Le arti figurative, in Prato, storia di una città 1**, Comune di Prato - Le Monnier, 1991, pp…
- F. Borsi-S. Borsi, Paolo Uccello, Milano 1992
- Claudio Cerretelli, Prato e la sua Provincia, I ed., Prato 1995
- Anna Padoa Rizzo, La Cappella dell'Assunta nel Duomo di Prato, Martini, Prato 1997
- Mauro Minardi, Paolo Uccello, Rizzoli, Milano 2004.
