= Funeral of Saint Jerome (Filippo Lippi) =

Painting by Filippo Lippi

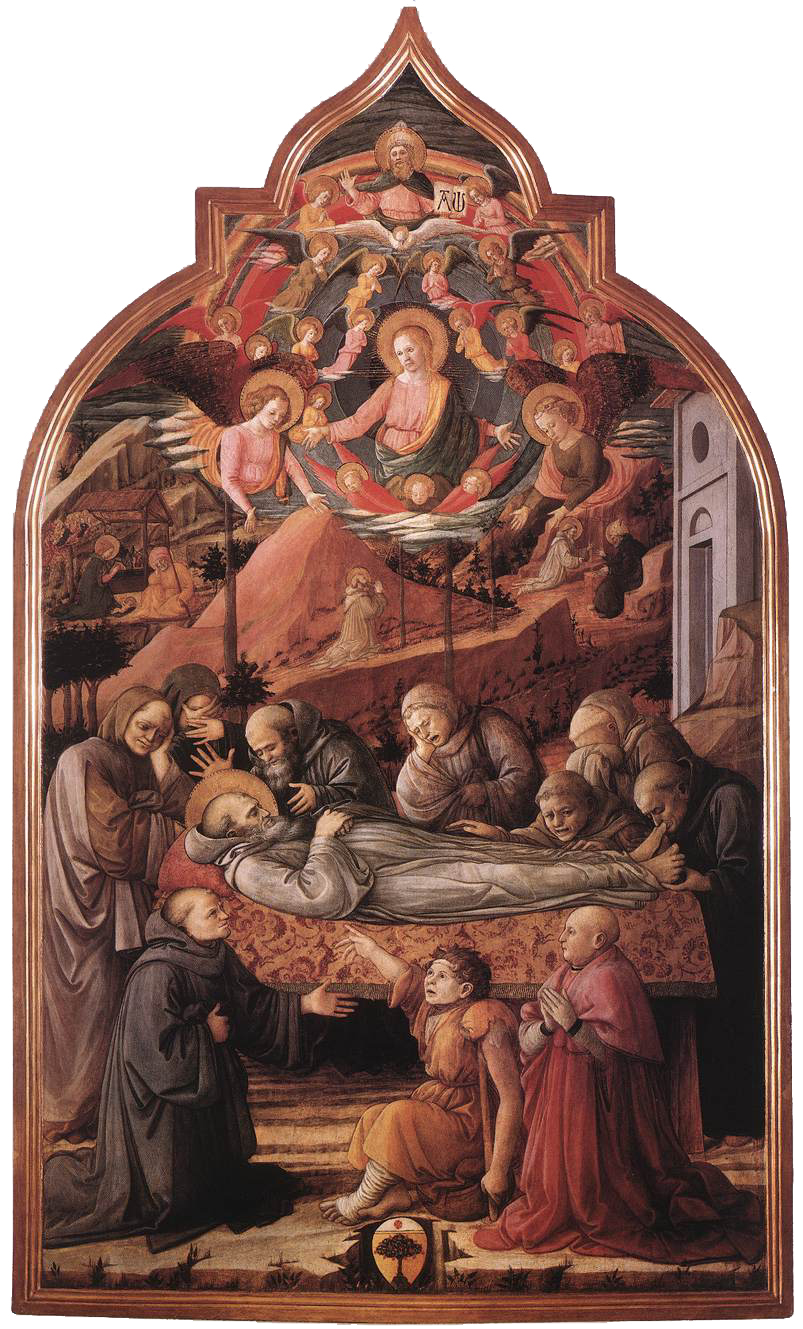
- Artist: Filippo Lippi
- Year: 1452–1460
- Medium: Tempera on panel
- Dimensions: 268 cm × 165 cm (106 in × 65 in)
- Location: Museo dell'Opera del Duomo, Prato

The Funeral of Saint Jerome is a painting by the Italian Renaissance painter Filippo Lippi of Saint Jerome's funeral. It is housed in the Museo dell'Opera del Duomo next to the Cathedral of Prato, central Italy.

== History ==
The large altarpiece was commissioned by the provost of Prato, Geminiano Inghirami, a patron of the arts who also called Donatello and Michelozzo to work in the cathedral. The panel is dated 1440, but this has been always considered a false due to the large stylistic differences with other Lippi's works of the period. It is generally recognized to be from between 1452, when Lippi arrived in Prato (or a few years before), and Inghirami's death in 1460.

It is housed in the cathedral's museum since the 20th century.

== Description ==
The work features numerous characters, painted in different attitudes. In the center, lying on a catafalque with a precious cloth decorated with pomegranates, is the body of Saint Jerome. He is surrounded by a group of monks, whose faces show their mourning and despair for the saint's death. The pomegranate cloth is also visible in the funerary monument of Geminiano Inghirami, once in the church of San Francesco, attributed to Pasquino da Montepulciano (1460).

The mourner's faces show that Lippi had studied Giotto's work in the Bardi Chapel, as some gestures are very similar, such as that of the monks kissing the saint's feet or the one raising his hands. Also the saint's position is similar to Giotto's, as well as the presence of ancient numismatic, a widespread theme at the time.

In the foreground is Inghirami kneeling, with a crippled youth in front of him who points at Jerome's body (a trick to avoid that the donor's red garments could distract the observer). The crippled figure is inspired by the frescoes by Masaccio and Masolino da Panicale in the Brancacci Chapel, which Lippi knew well as he had a been a monk in the convent housing the chapel in his youth.

The upper part of the panel, aside from rocky mountains with three secondary scenes (Adoration of the Child and two episodes of the saint's life), is occupied by angels, perhaps executed by Fra' Diamante or another collaborator. Among them circles which allude to the Heaven's Circles, the Redeemer (with a book with Alpha and Omega), the Holy Spirit dove and the Jesus opening his arms.

At the bottom is the coat of arms of the Inghirami family.
