= Fra Diamante =

Italian painter

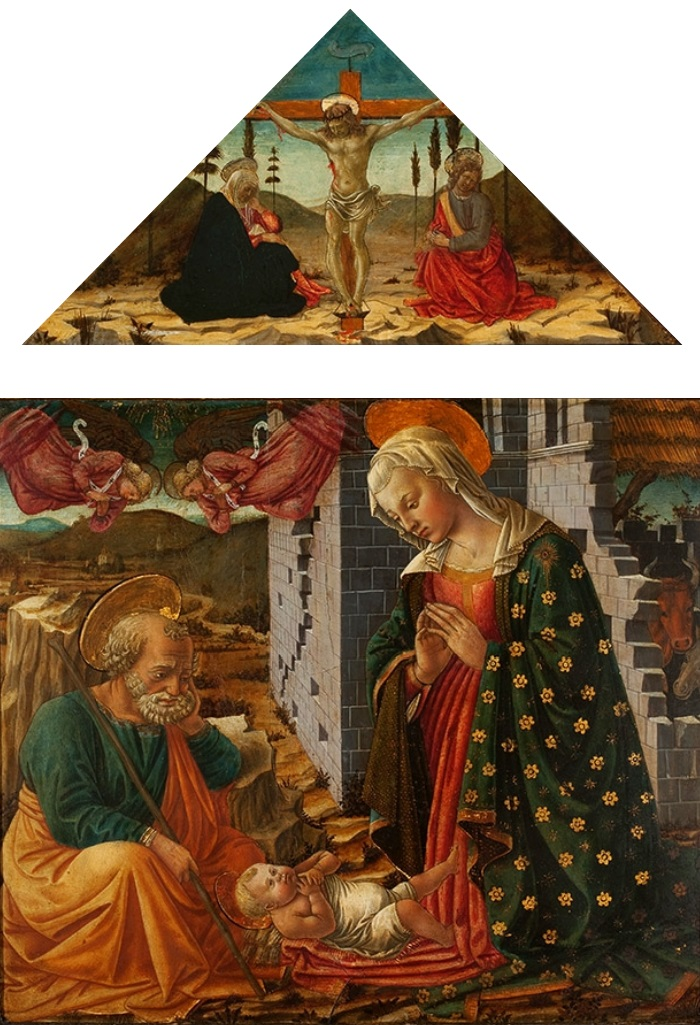
Adoration of the Child, paintings by Fra Diamante, c. 1470, National Museum in Warsaw.

Fra Diamante (c. 1430 – c. 1498) was an Italian Renaissance painter.

== Biography ==
Born at Prato, he was a Carmelite friar, a member of the Florentine community of that order, and was the friend and assistant of Filippo Lippi. The Carmelite convent of Prato which he adorned with many works in fresco has been suppressed, and the buildings have been altered to a degree involving the destruction of the paintings. He was the principal assistant of Lippi in the large frescoes at the east end of the cathedral of Prato. He also collaborated in the Funeral of St. Jerome panel in the same church.

Amid the work he was recalled to Florence by his conventual superior, and a minute of proceedings of the commune of Prato is still extant, in which it is determined to petition the metropolitan of Florence to obtain his return to Prato, a proof that his share in the work was so important that his recall involved the suspension of it. Subsequently, he assisted Filippo in the execution of the frescoes in the cathedral of Spoleto, which Fra Diamante completed in 1470 after his master died in 1469.

Lippi left a son ten years old (the future artist Filippino Lippi) to the care of Diamante, who, having received 200 ducats from the commune of Spoleto, as the balance due for the work done in the cathedral, returned with the child to Florence, and, as art biographer Giorgio Vasari says, bought land for himself with the money, giving but a small portion to the child. The accusation of wrongdoing, however, would depend upon the share of the work executed by Fra Diamante, and the terms of his agreement with Lippi. Fra Diamante must have been nearly seventy when he completed the frescoes at Spoleto, but the exact year of his death is not known.
