= Prato Cathedral =

Roman Catholic cathedral in Prato, Tuscany, Italy

Prato Cathedral Duomo di Prato; Cattedrale di Santo Stefano (in Italian)
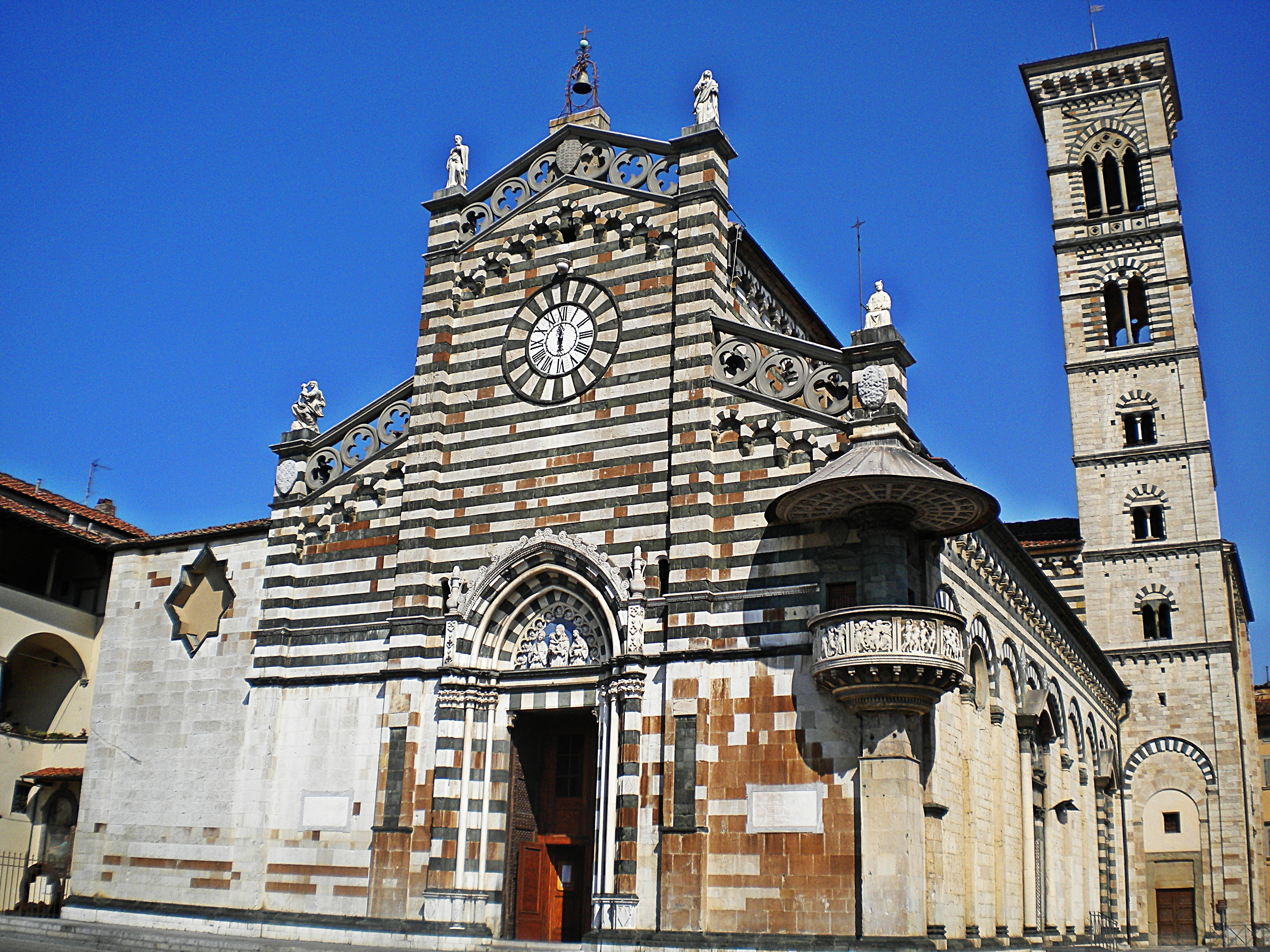
- The west front of the cathedral

Religion
- Affiliation: Roman Catholic
- Province: Prato

Location
- Location: Prato, Italy
- Interactive map of Prato Cathedral; Duomo di Prato; Cattedrale di Santo Stefano (in Italian)
- Coordinates: 43°52′55″N 11°05′52″E

Architecture
- Type: Church
- Style: Romanesque
- Groundbreaking: 1100 ca.
- Completed: 1500 ca.

Prato Cathedral, or Cathedral of Saint Stephen, (Italian: Duomo di Prato; Cattedrale di Santo Stefano) is a Roman Catholic cathedral in Prato, Tuscany, Central Italy, from 1954 the seat of the Bishop of Prato, having been previously, from 1653, a cathedral in the Diocese of Pistoia and Prato. It is dedicated to Saint Stephen, the first Christian martyr.

It is one of the most ancient churches in the city, and was already in existence in the 10th century. It was built in several successive stages in the Romanesque style. The church contains a number of notable works of art, in particular fine sculpture.

== History ==
The church of Saint Stephen was built in a green meadow (Prato) after an appearance of the Virgin Mary near the village of Borgo al Cornio (the present center of Prato). The first building was a small parish church, documented as early as AD 994 as the Pieve di Santo Stefano. A substantial expansion of the church building began in the 15th century, enlarging the nave and aisles, and erecting the bell tower (completed 1356); this transformed the modest building into the Gothic-Romanesque building we see today.

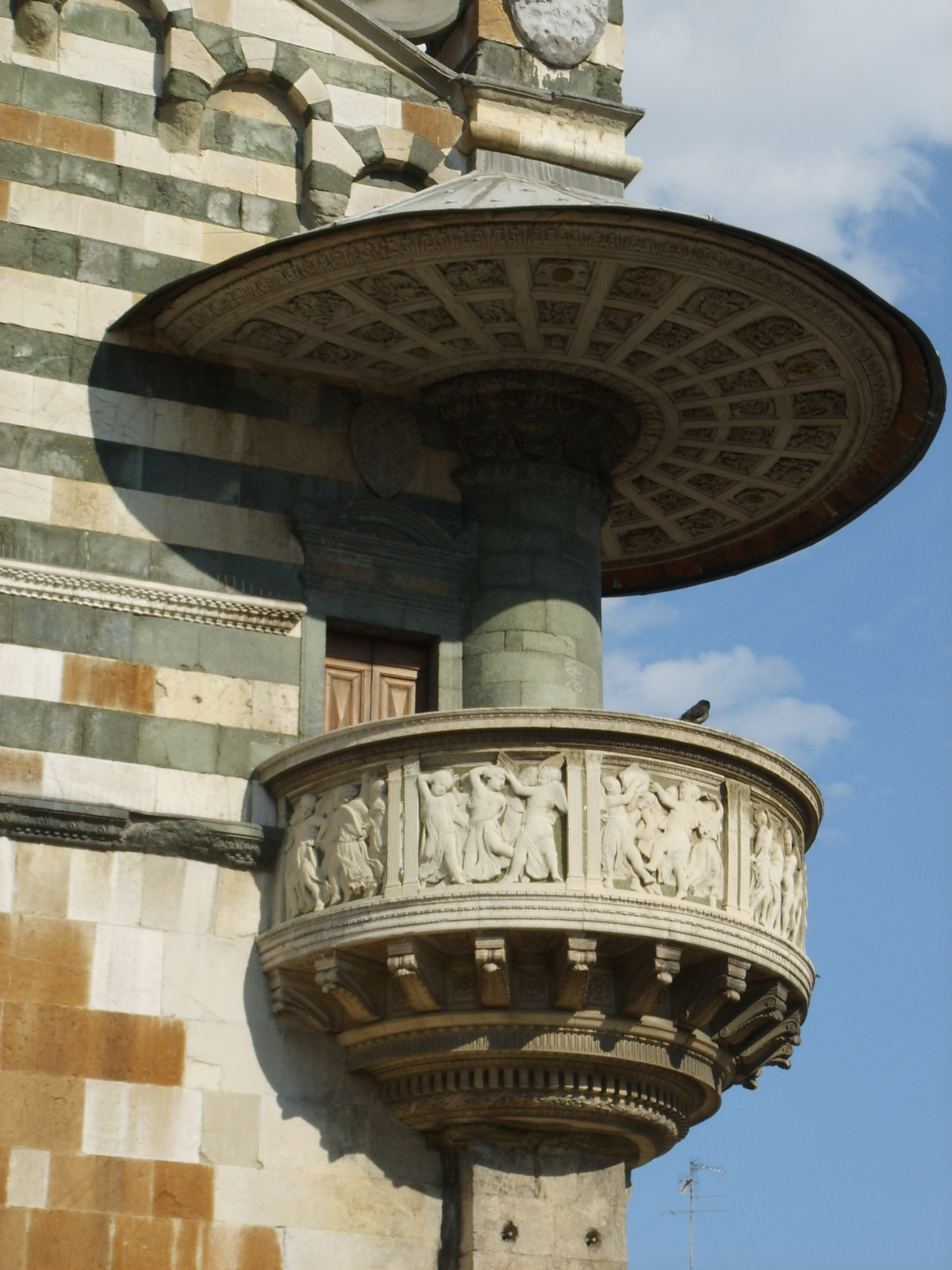
Outside pulpit by Donatello and Michelozzo

During the 14th century the cathedral acquired an important relic, the Sacra Cintola or Belt of the Holy Virgin. This brought about the enlargement of the edifice by the addition of a transept which is attributed to Giovanni Pisano, but is probably the work of a pupil of Nicola Pisano. The Cintola Chapel was also built at this time to house the relic.

In the early 15th century, a new façade or west front was added in the International Gothic style, in front of the old one. In the space between the two was created a narthex or corridor leading to the external pulpit, built by Michelozzo and decorated by Donatello between 1428 and 1438. The seven original reliefs of the parapet were removed from the pulpit in 1967 and can be seen today in Prato's cathedral museum.

The façade is architecturally simple, the shape of the building informing the new structure so that its low-pitched central roof and sloping side aisles mark the roofline, which is enlivened with an open parapet of simple Gothic tracery, uniting the building with the sky. The façade is divided into three sections by shallow buttresses or pilasters. That part above the springing of the door arch is faced with marble in bold contrasting stripes, while the lower part is pale-coloured but much stained in some areas, possibly from the absorption of pollutants.

The façade has a single central portal with a lintelled doorway surmounted by a Gothic arch. In the lunette over the door is a glazed terracotta sculpture by Andrea della Robbia depicting the Madonna with Saints Stephen and John.

Below the central gable, a decorative clock is set into the façade, in place of a central window. It is surrounded by segments of the contrasting marble and forms part of the harmonious design.

The frescoes of the transept chapel are also of the 15th century, but are in the Renaissance painting style.

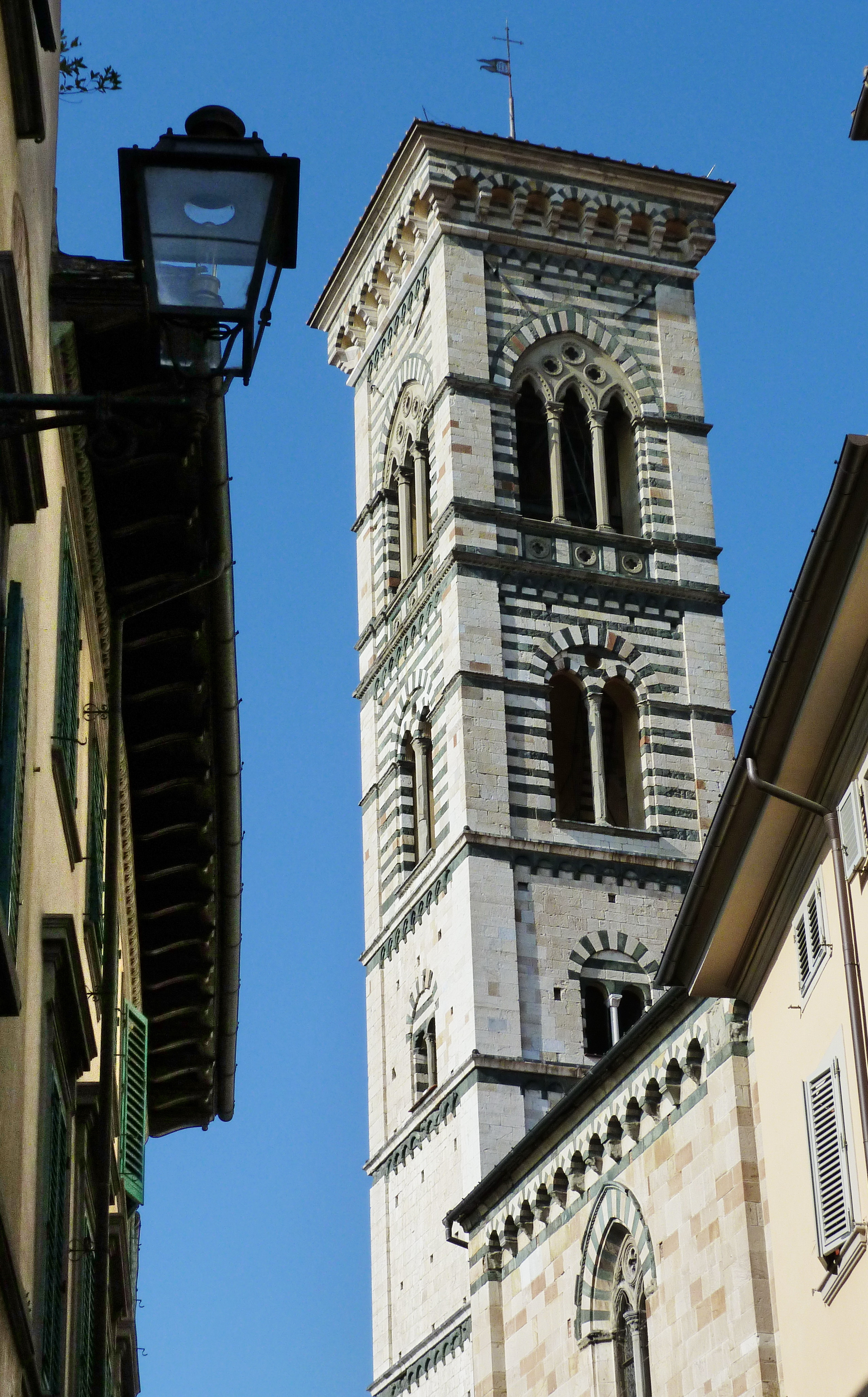
Piazza of the Duomo

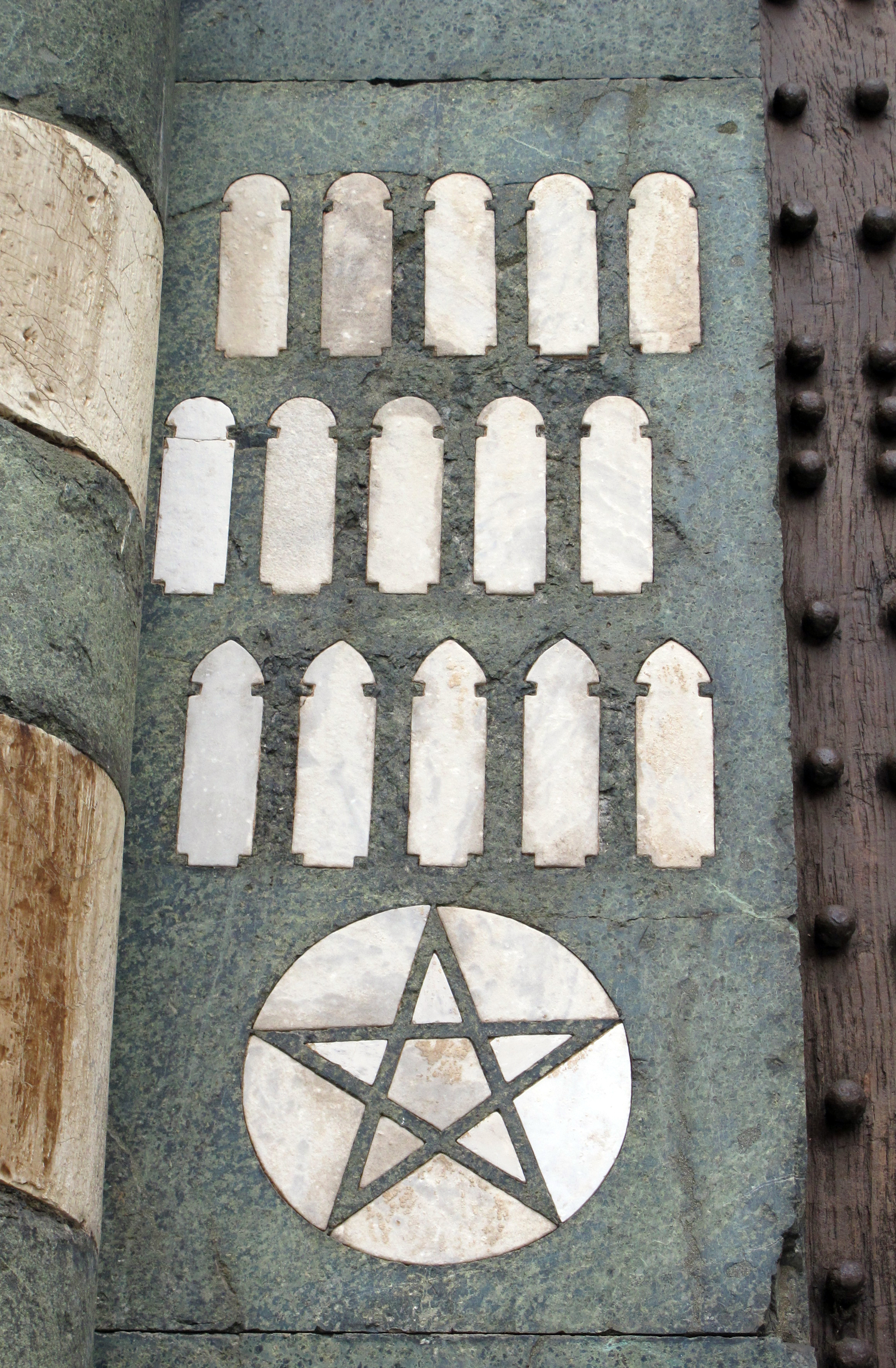
South portal colored marble frame

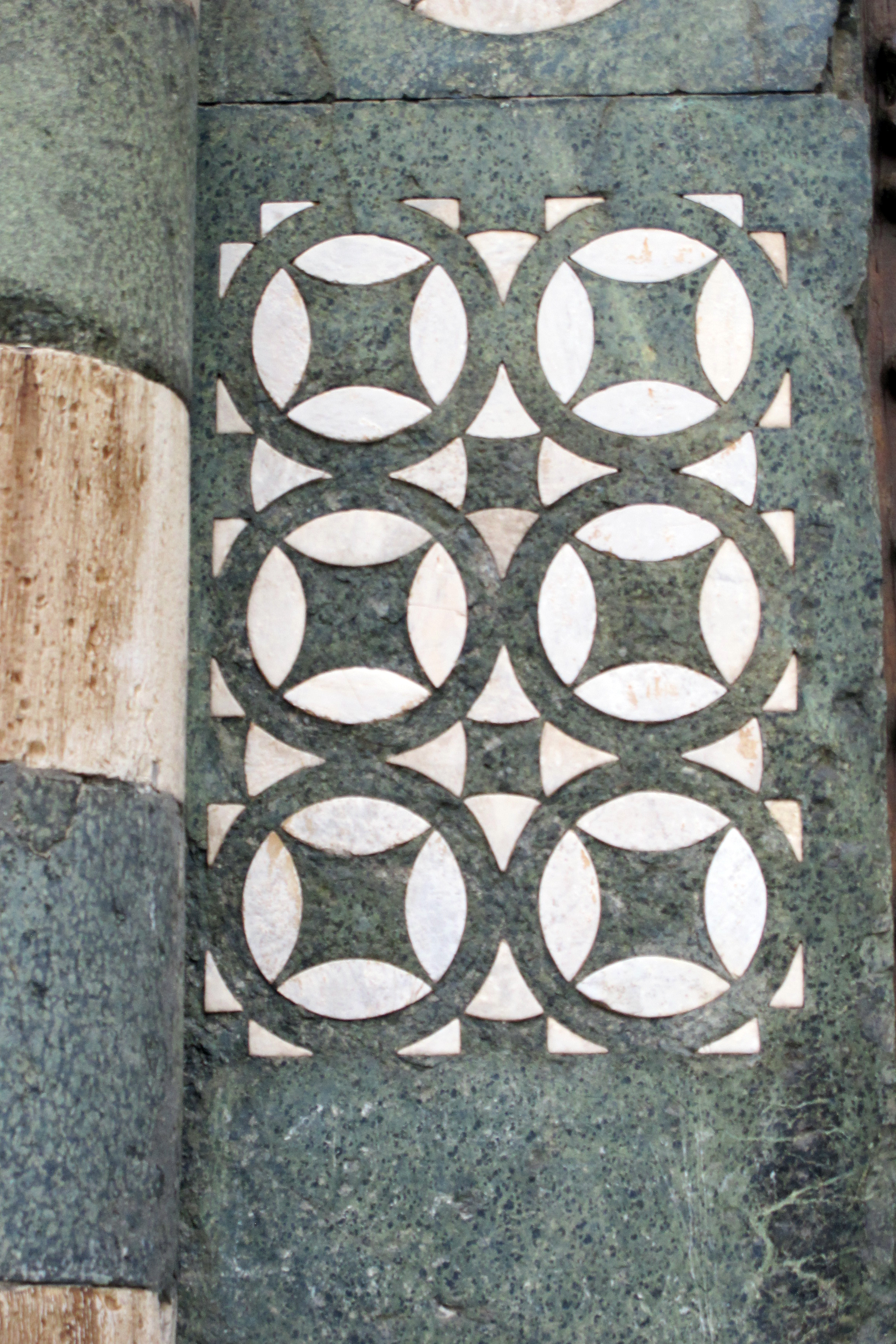
South portal

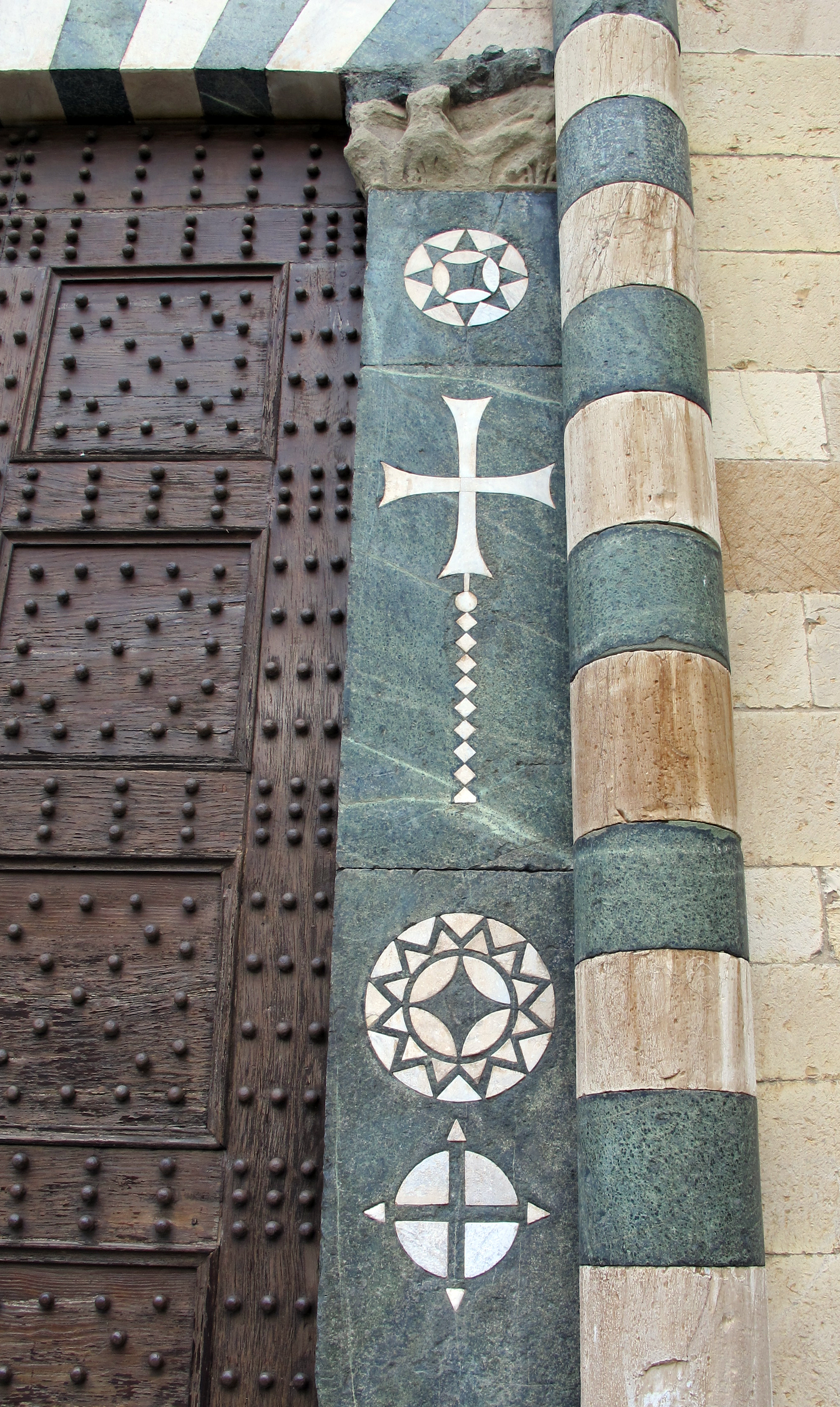
South portal

== Interior ==
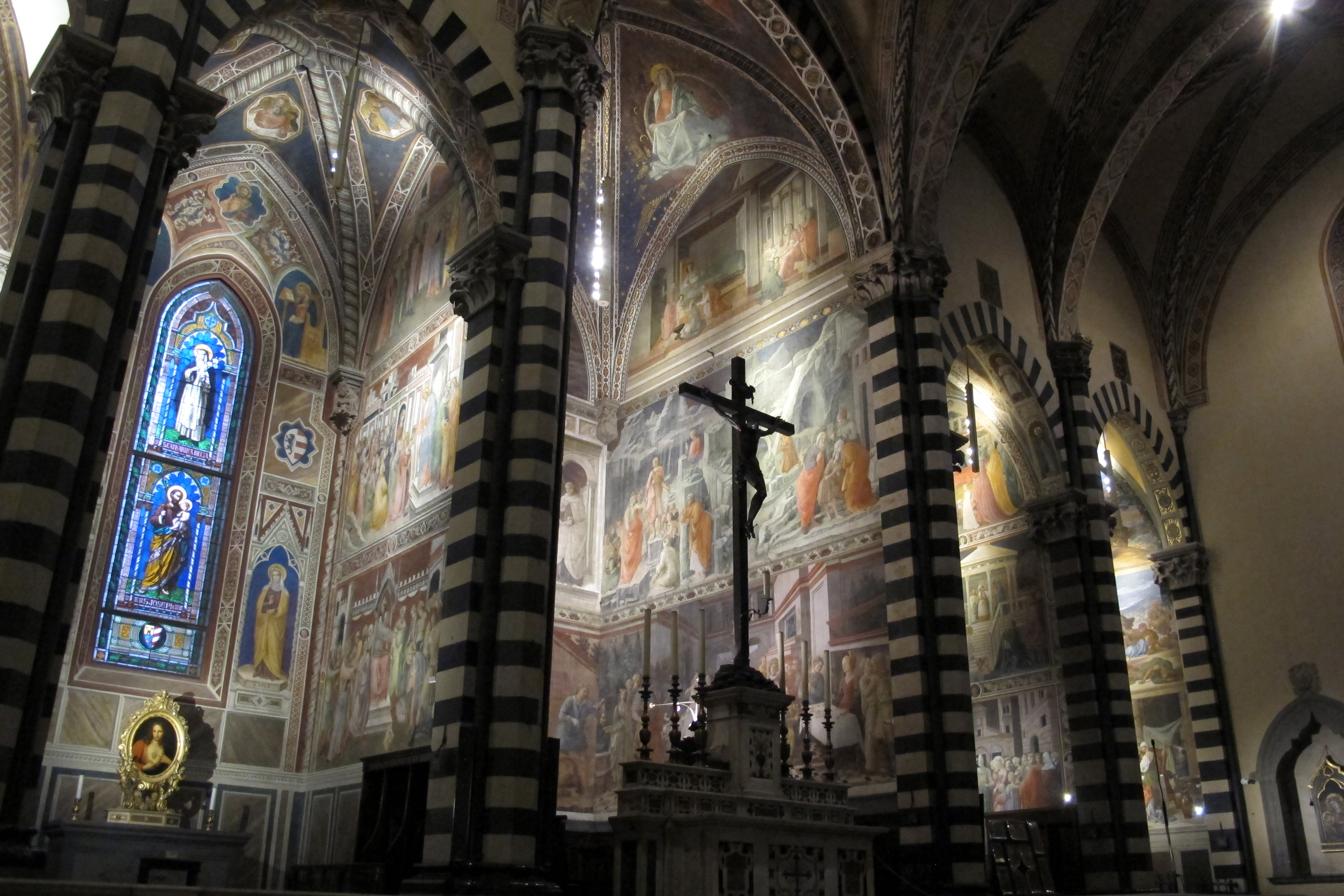

Internally, the church, built on a Latin cross ground plan, has a nave and two side aisles, all in Romanesque style and dating from the early 13th century. They are separated by elegant columns of green serpentine, the capitals being attributed to Guidetto. The vaults, designed by Ferdinando Tacca, were added in the 17th century.

The north aisle houses a notable Renaissance pulpit in white marble (1469–1473). The base is decorated with sphinxes. The parapet has reliefs by Antonio Rossellino, portraying the Assumption and the Stories of St. Stephen, and by Mino da Fiesole portraying the Stories of St. John the Baptist. It is faced, in the opposite aisle, by a great bronze candelabrum by Maso di Bartolomeo (1440), having an elongated vase-shape from which seven branches protrude. Maso also executed the balcony of the inner west wall, which in addition is decorated with a fresco of the Assumption by David and Ridolfo del Ghirlandaio.

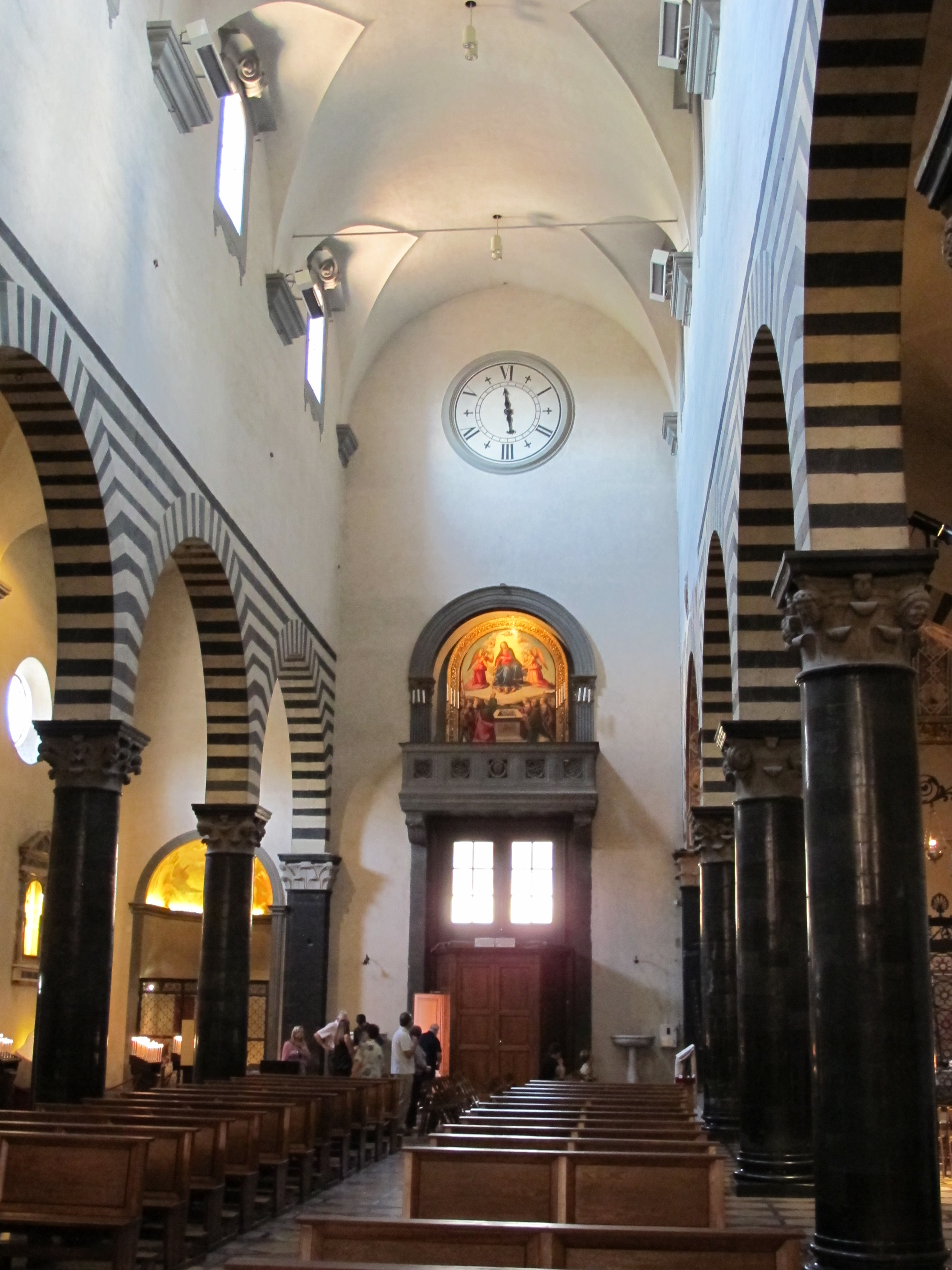
Interior of church

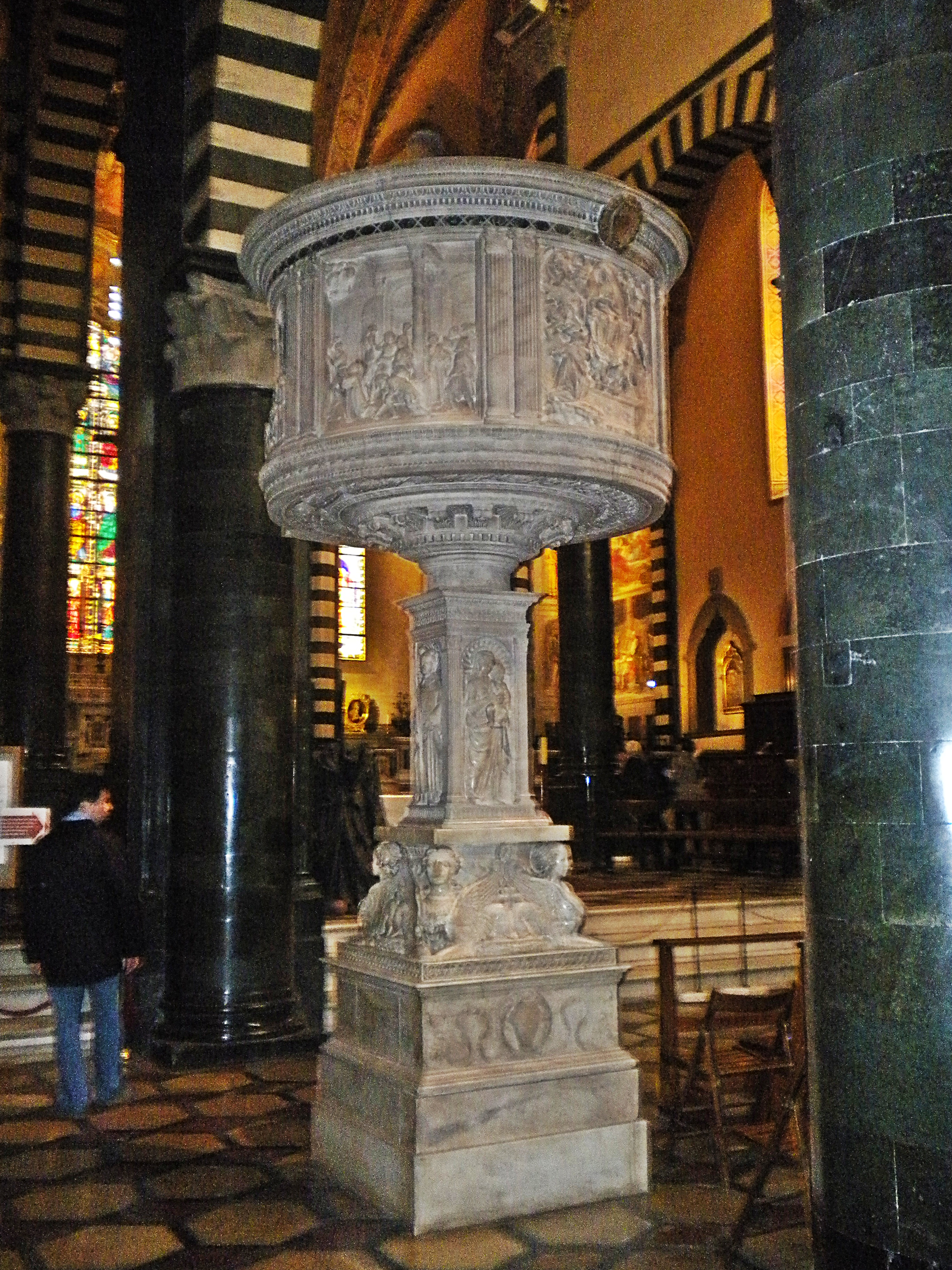
Interior pulpit

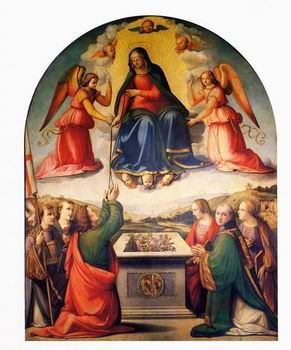
Madonna of the Assumption by Ghirlandaio

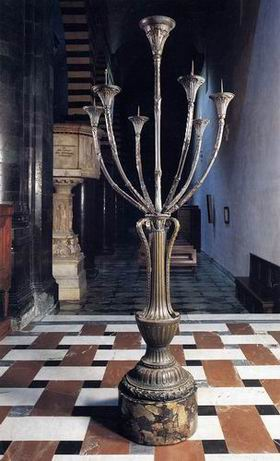
Candelabra by Maso di Bartolomeo

=== Transept ===
A small staircase leads from the old church to the 14th-century transept, which has five high cross vaults, each ending in an apse divided by pilasters. The presbytery has three works by the American artist Robert Morris (2000–2001).

In the south arm of the transept is the Renaissance tabernacle by the Da Maiano brothers: the Madonna with Child terracotta (1480) is by the more famous Benedetto.

The chapels can be accessed through a 17th-century balustrade in polychrome marble, for which parts of the Renaissance choir were re-used (including crests and cherubim).

=== Transept chapels ===
In the south arm of the transept, the Vinaccesi Chapel houses a notable Deposition of Christ from the 13th century. It also has 19th-century frescoes by the Pratese painter Alessandro Franchi.

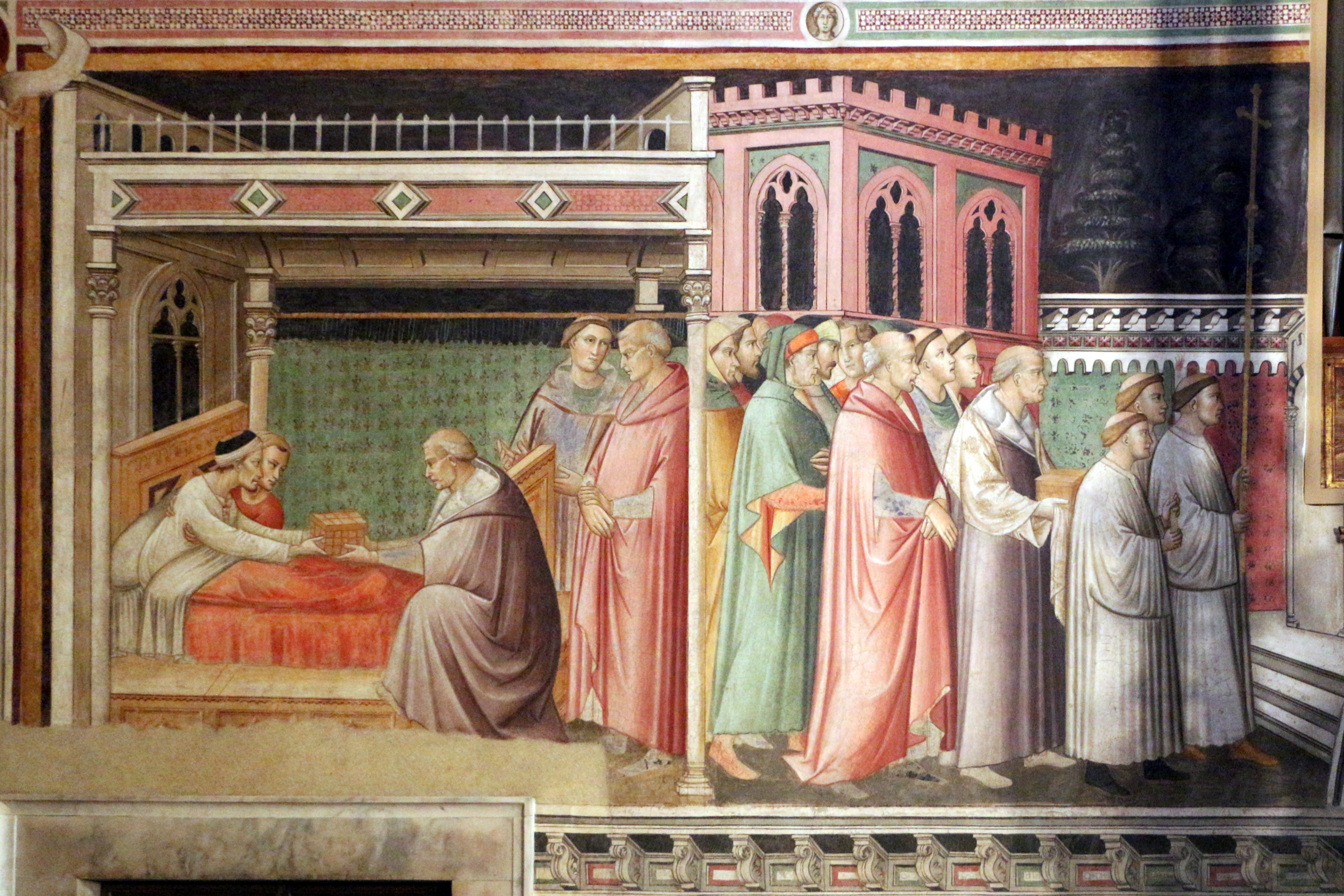
Chapel of the Sacred Girdle - fresco by Agnolo Gaddi

Next is the Assumption Chapel, which was frescoed in 1435-1436 by the Master of Prato and by a young Paolo Uccello, who painted the Stories of the Virgin and St. Stephen, completed by Andrea di Giusto in the lower section. They show enchanted figures caught in a wide range of brilliant colors, and surrounded by Brunelleschi-like architectures.

In the main chapel, or chancel, Filippo Lippi and Fra Diamante painted the Stories of St. Stephen and St. John the Baptist. On the lower north wall are depicted the Obsequies of St. Stephen, in which Lippi portrayed Pope Pius II, set in a Palaeo-Christian basilica, as an imposing figure in scarlet costume. On the right is the artist's self-portrait. On the opposite wall is Herod's Banquet, showing a large hall in which Salome is performing her ballet, and the handing over of the head of John the Baptist to Herodias. The altar (1653) is by Ferdinando Tacca.

The Manassei Chapel was frescoed by a pupil of Agnolo Gaddi in the early 15th century with Stories of St Margaret and St James. The last chapel on the left, the Chapel of the Inghirami, houses a funerary monument attributed to Benedetto da Maiano and a stained glass window from the early 16th century.

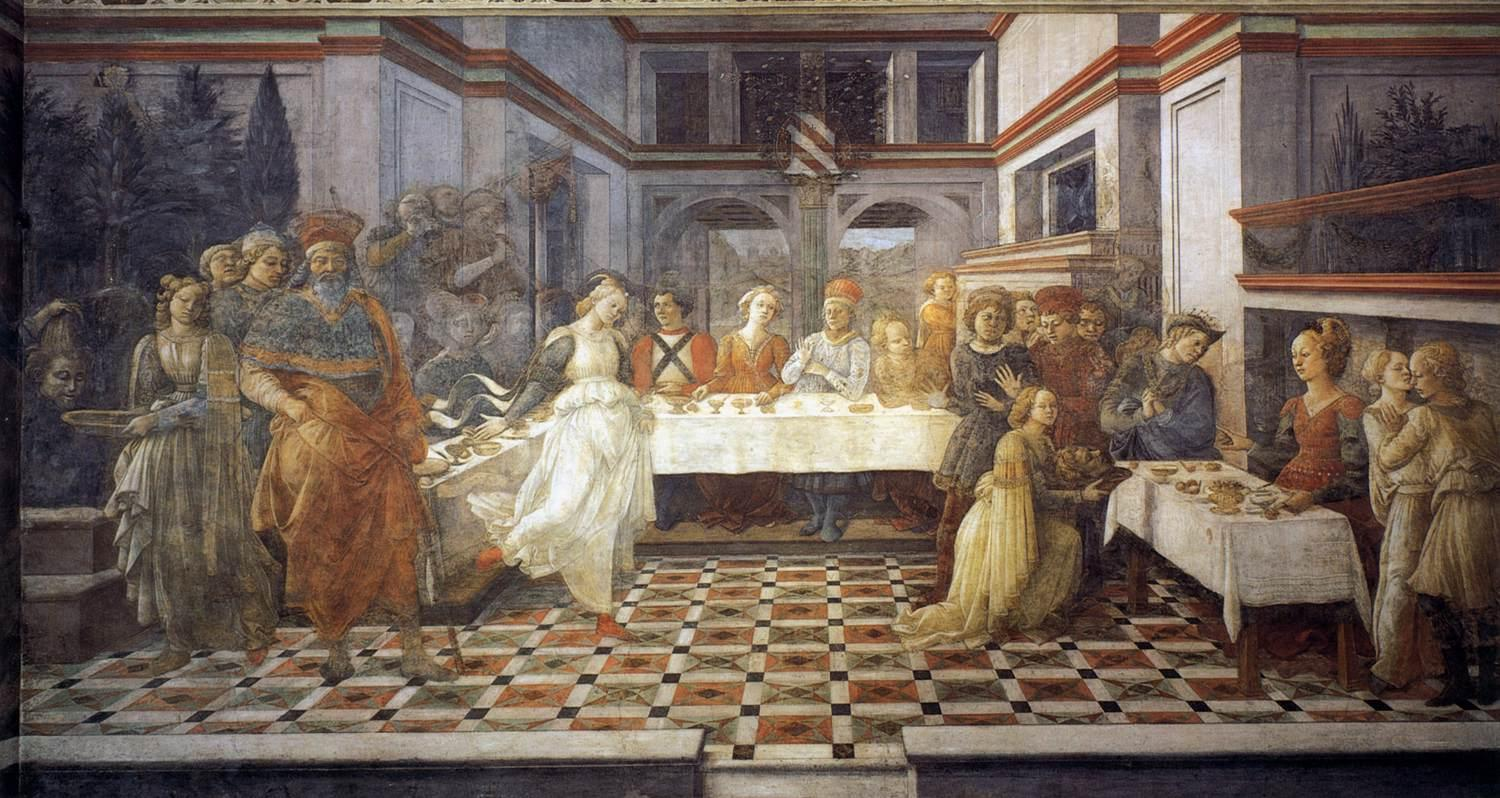
Herod's Banquet by Lippi

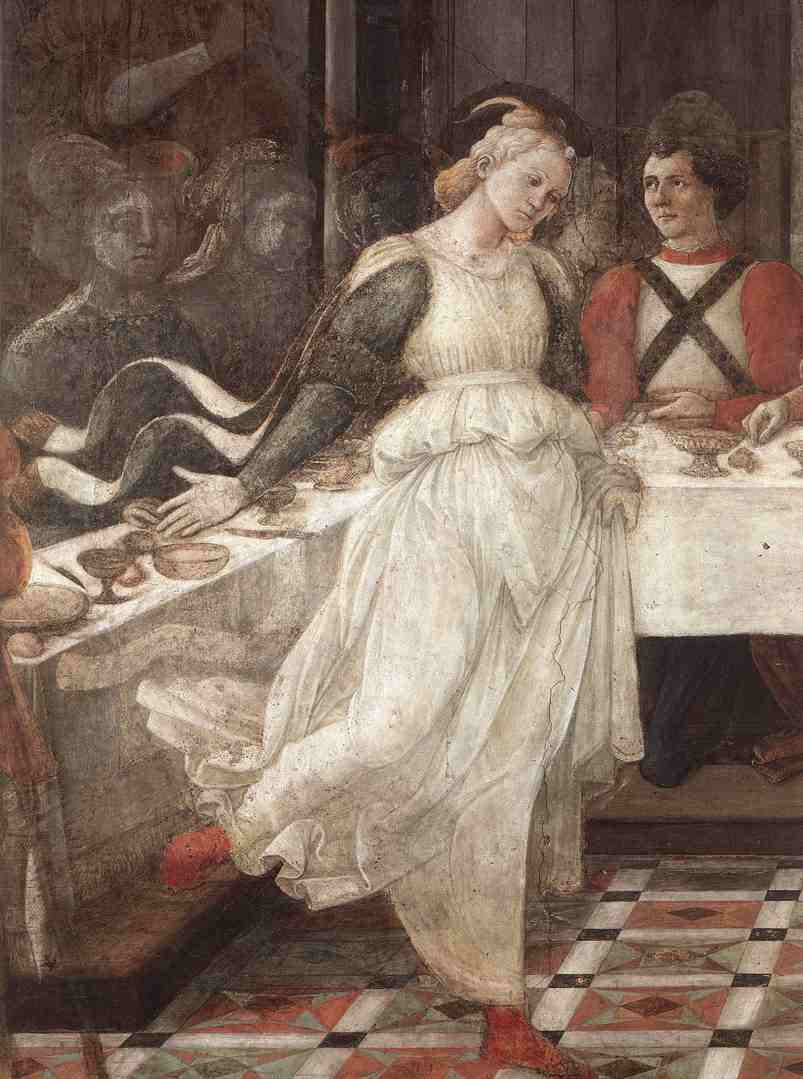
Detail of Salome in Herod's Banquet

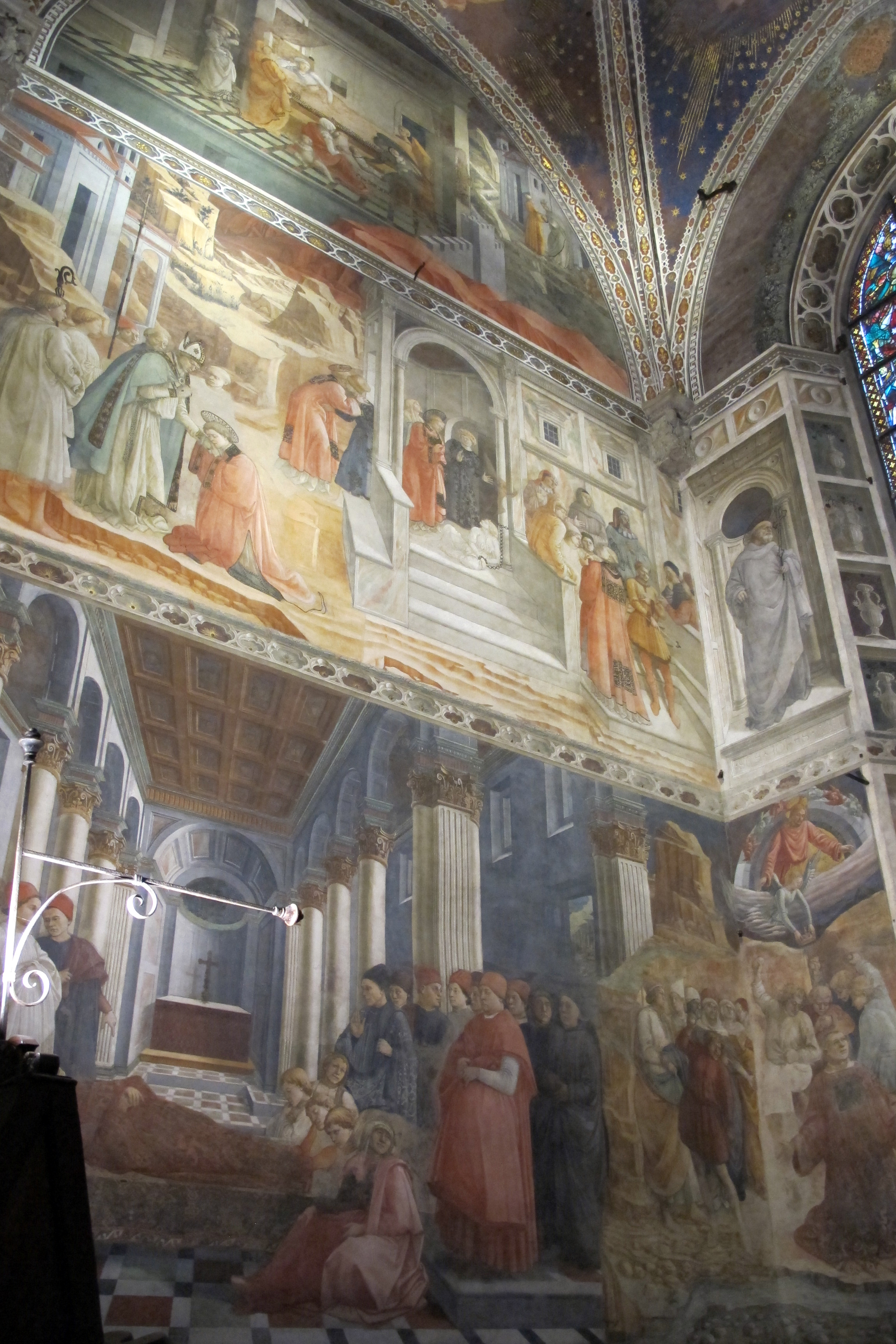
Frescoes by Lippi

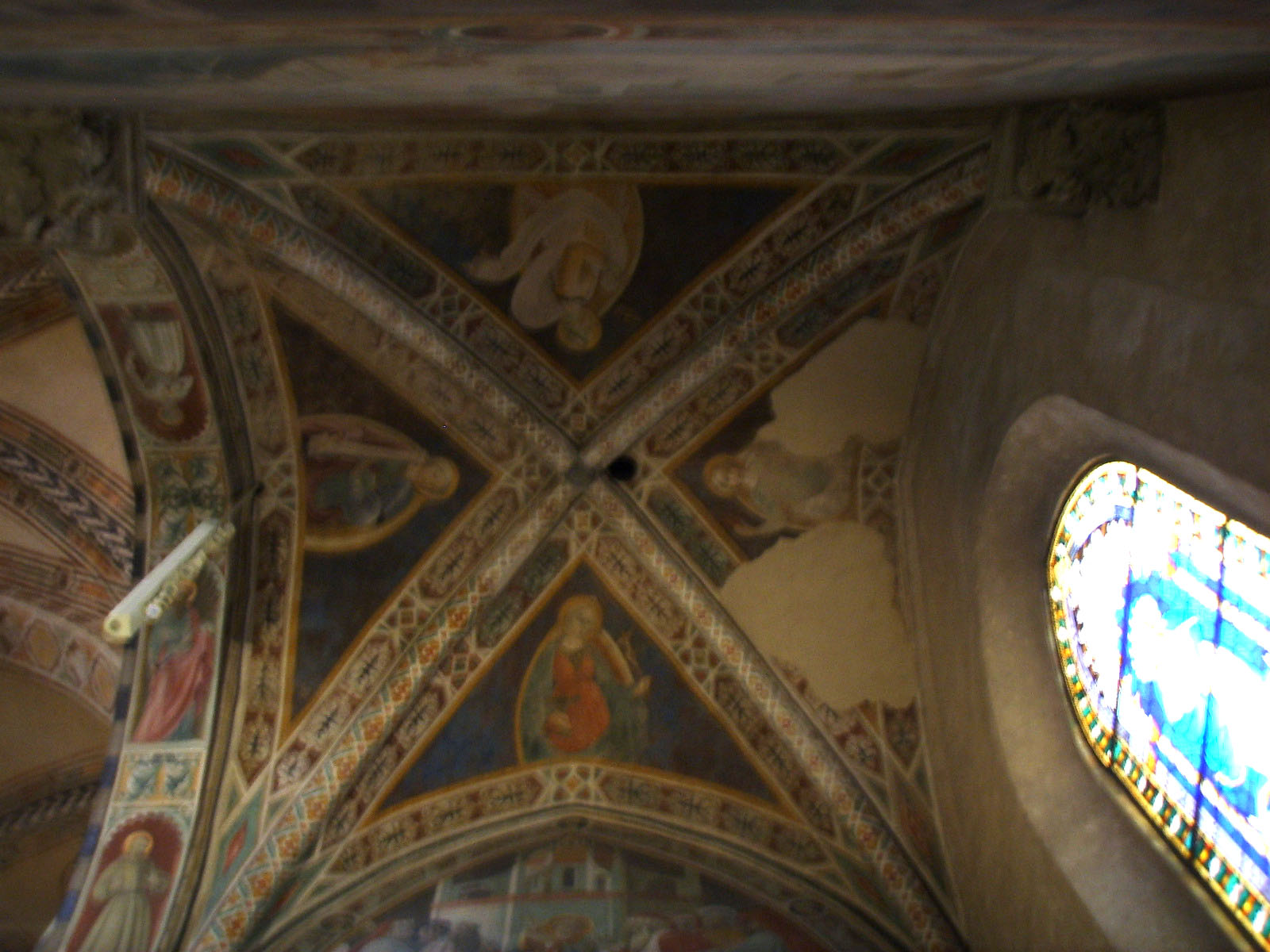
ceiling frescoes by Paolo Uccello

=== Cintola Chapel ===
The Cintola Chapel (Italian: Cappella del Sacro Cingolo) is located under the last arch of the north aisle, next to the counter-façade. It houses the Sacra Cintola or Girdle of Thomas, the belt which, according to the tradition, was given to Saint Thomas by the Virgin Mary during the Assumption. It was brought to Prato in the 13th century.

The chapel has frescoes of Stories of the Virgin and the Cintola by Agnolo Gaddi (1392–1395), which are notable for their luminous colors. Also noteworthy is the panorama of Prato in the Michael's Return scene.

The 18th-century altar, which encloses the Cintola, is crowned by a marble Madonna with Child (c. 1301), and is considered one of Giovanni Pisano's masterpieces.

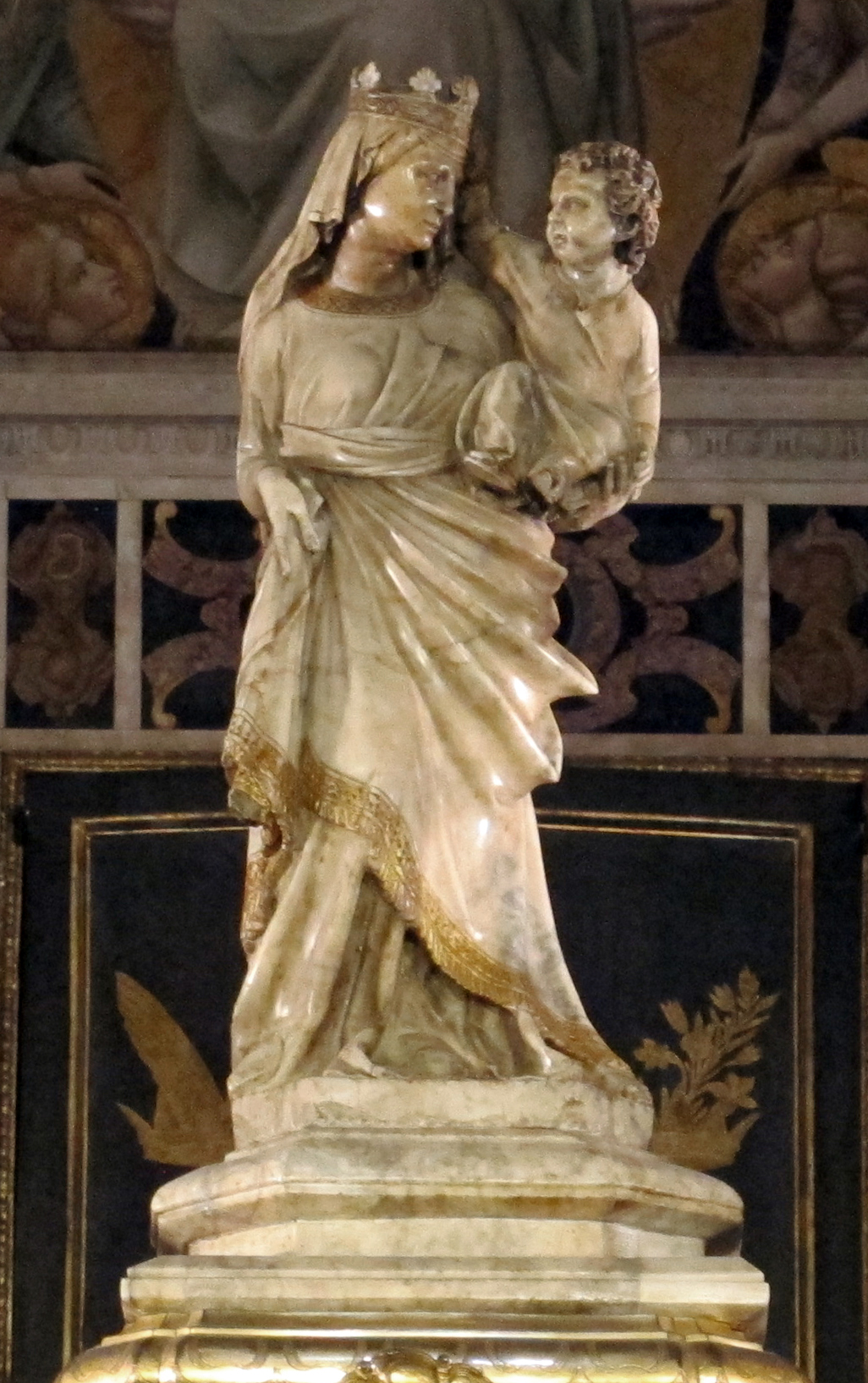
Madonna and Child by Giovanni Pisano

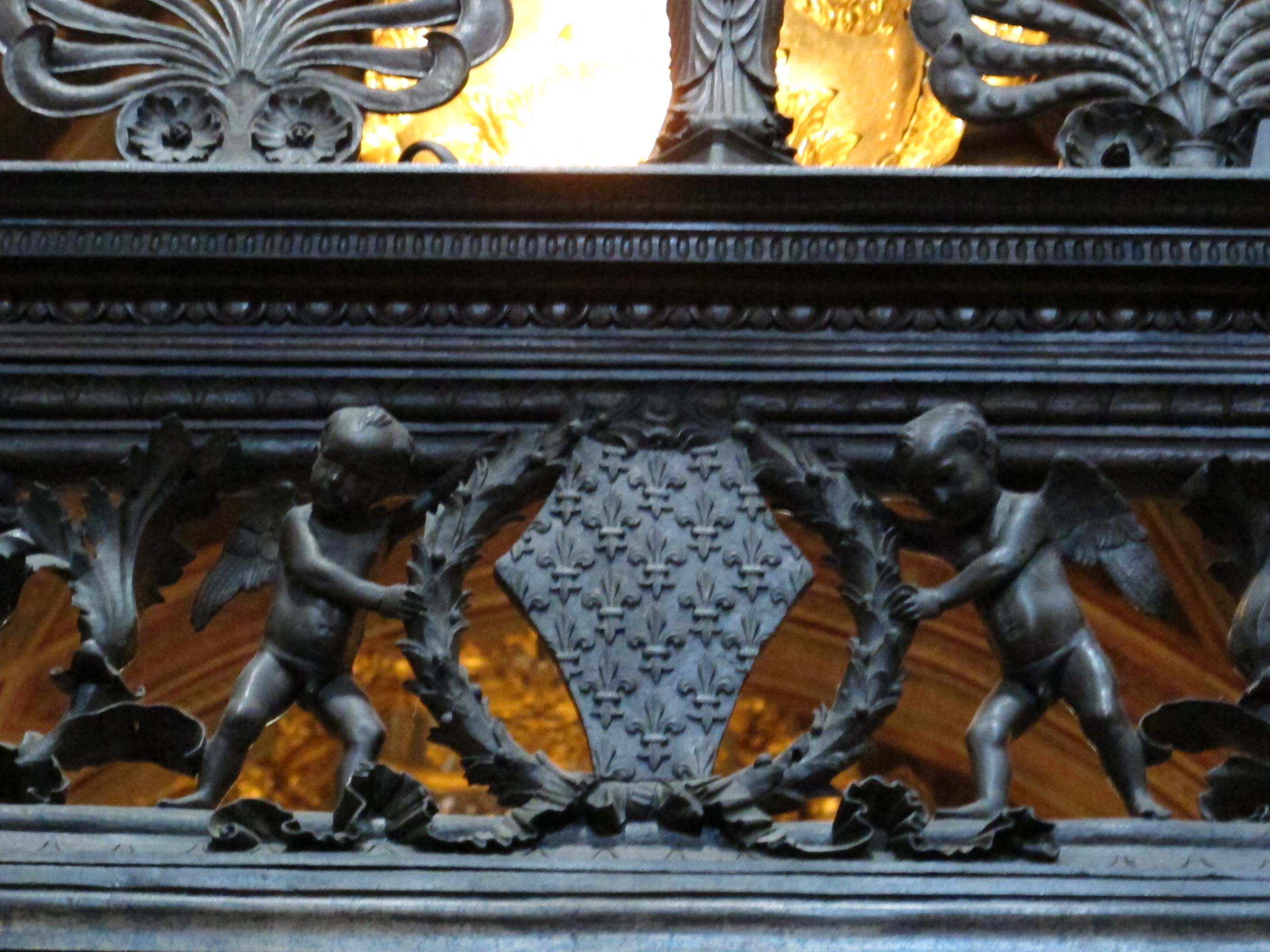
Monumental Gate by Maso di Bartolomeo,

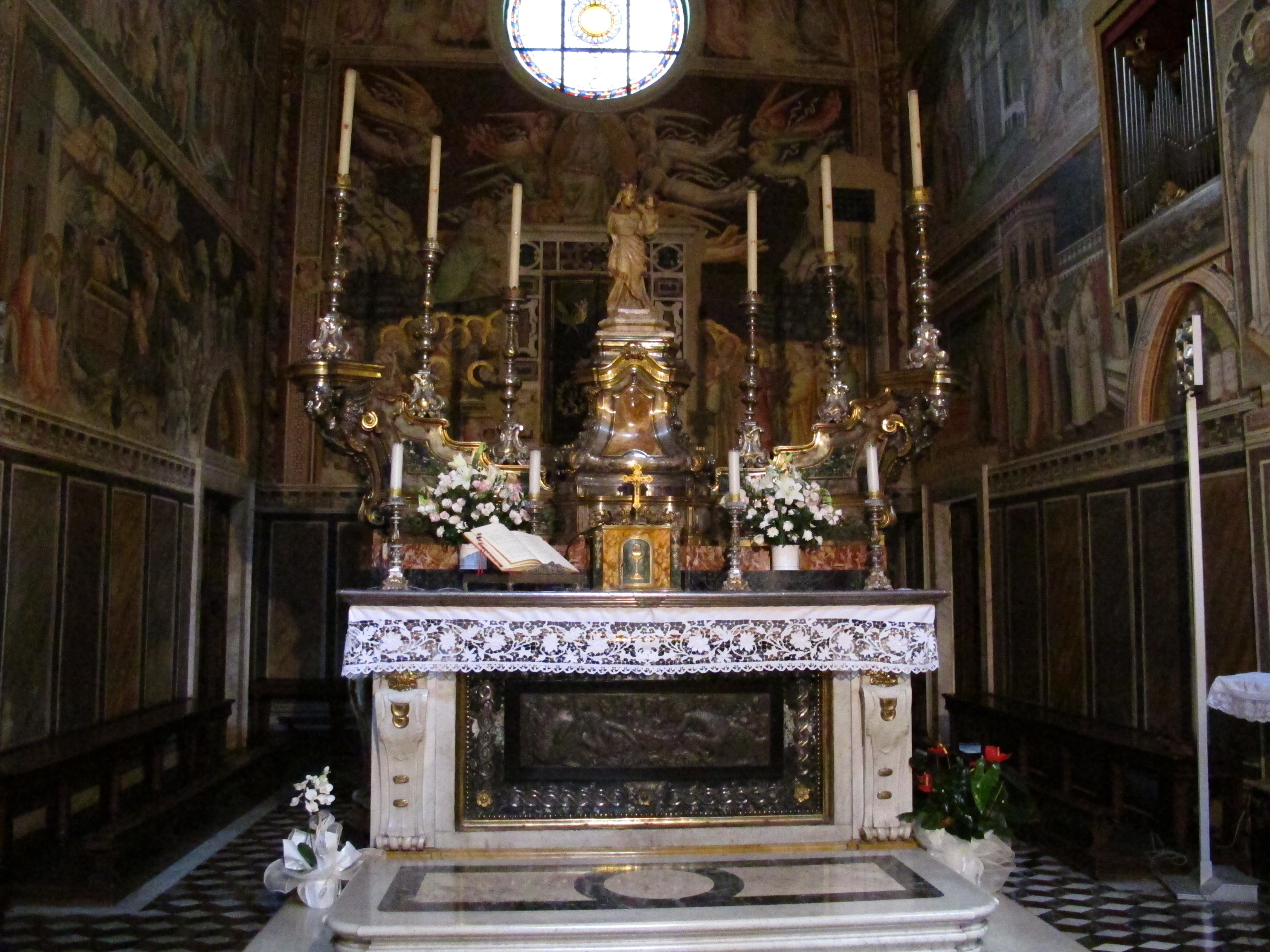
Altar of the Cintola

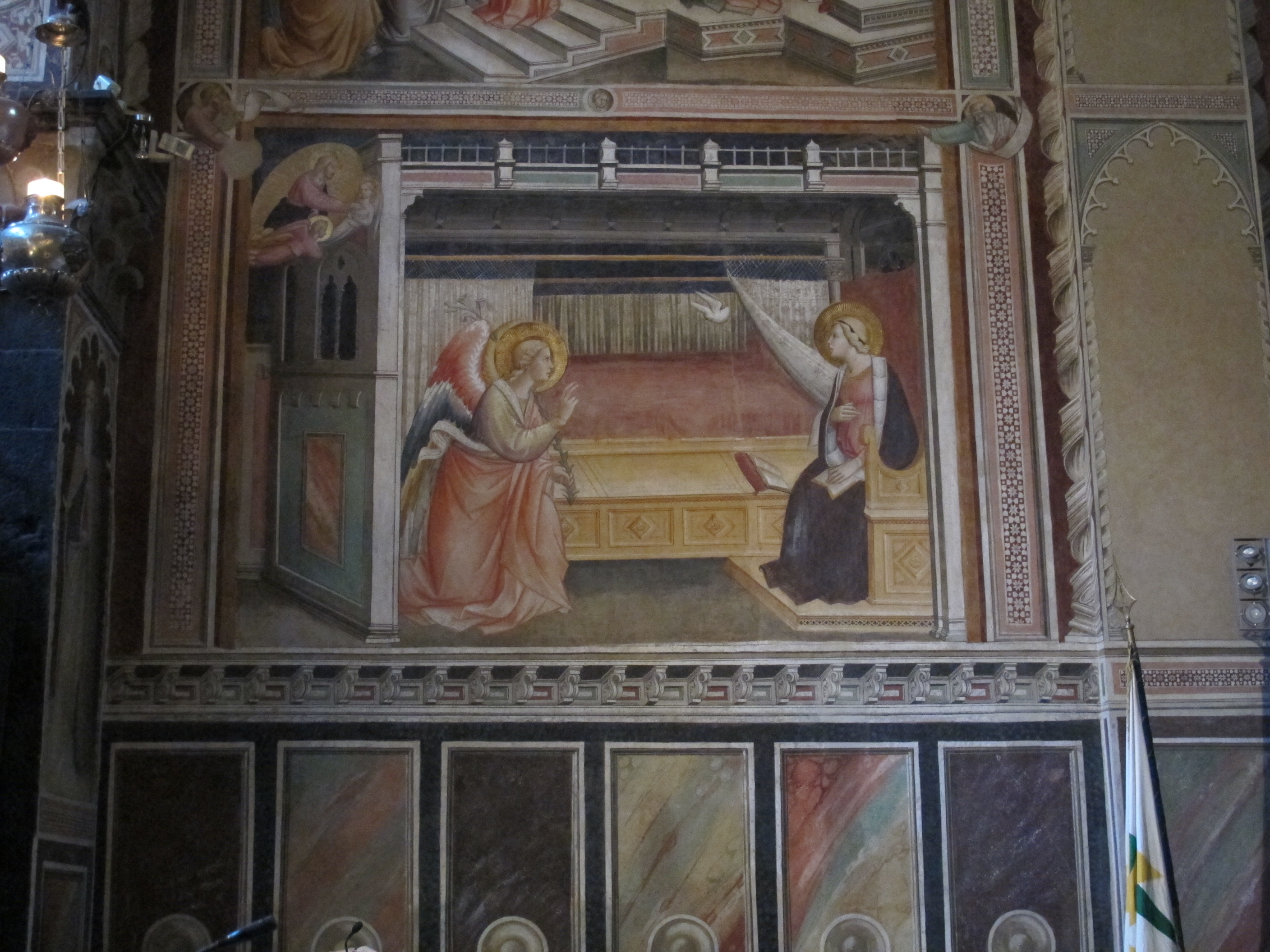
Annuciation by Gaddi

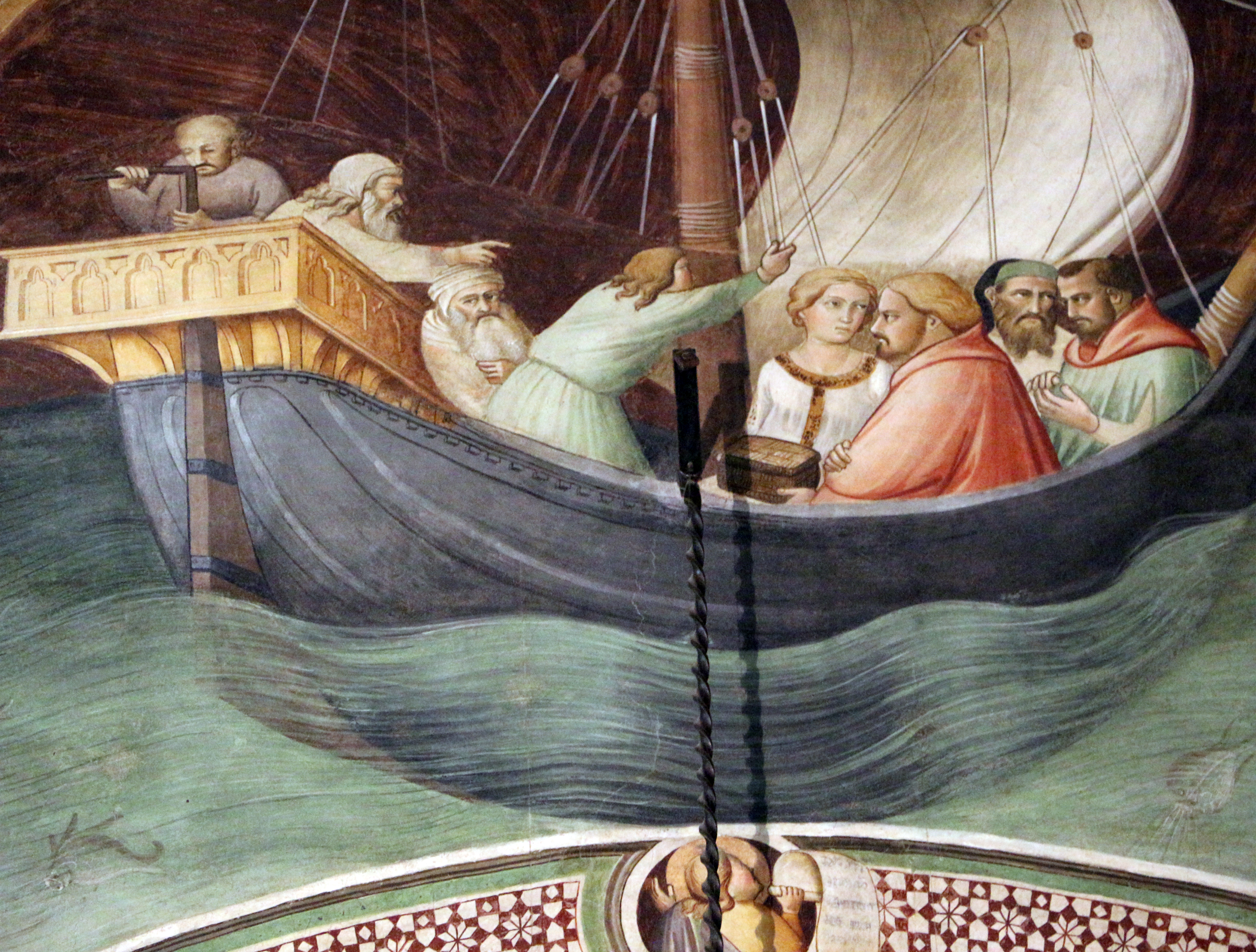
History of the Cintola by Gaddi

=== Images ===
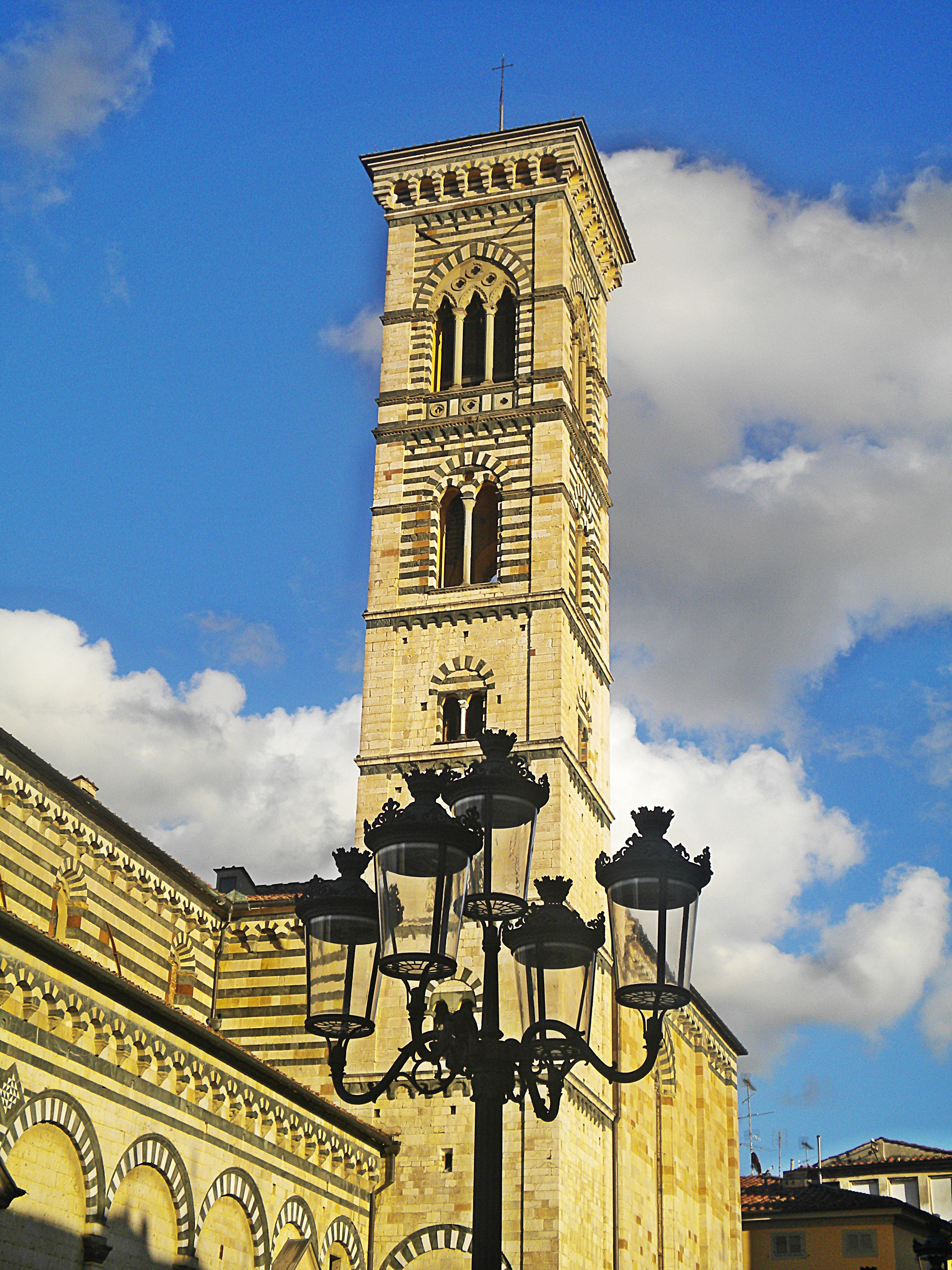
Bell tower

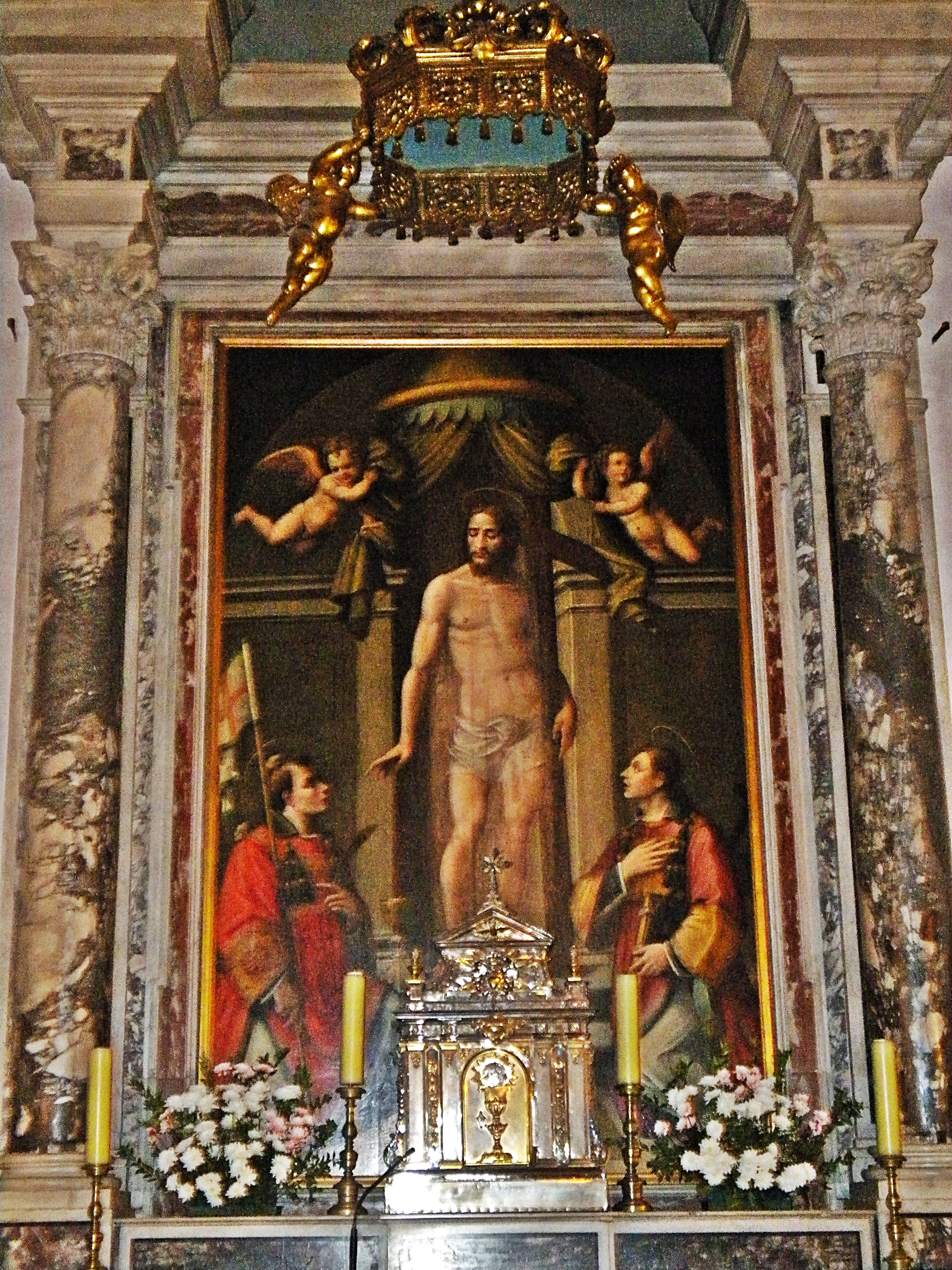
Chapel of the Blessed Sacrament - painting

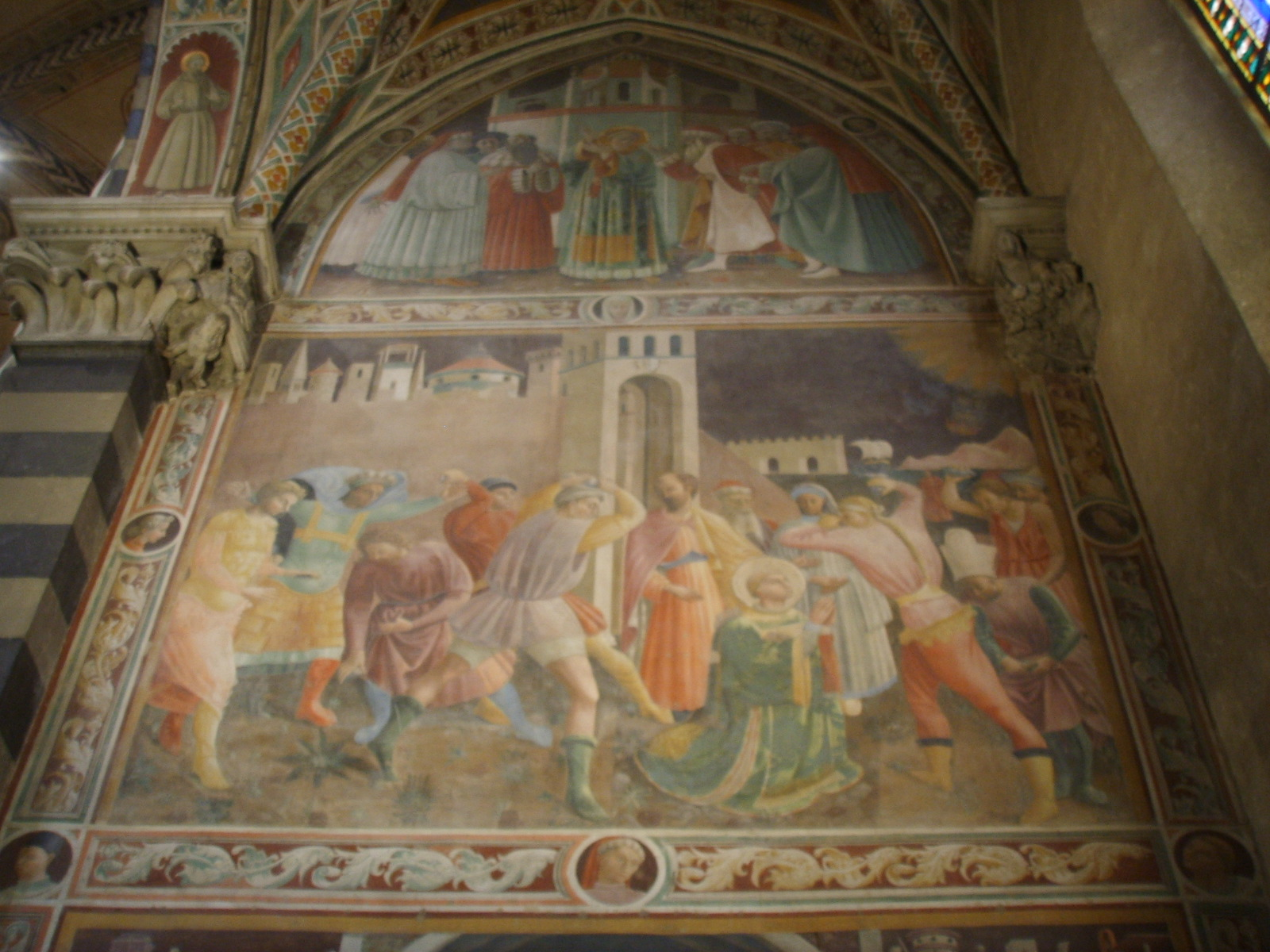
Chapel of the Assumption by Paolo Uccello

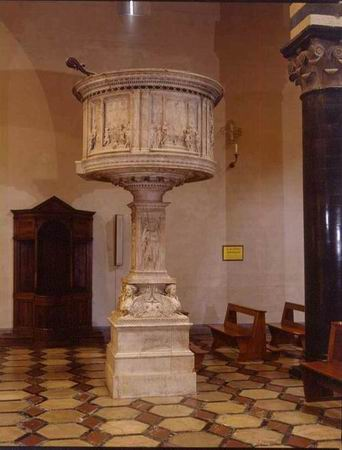
Inside pulpit

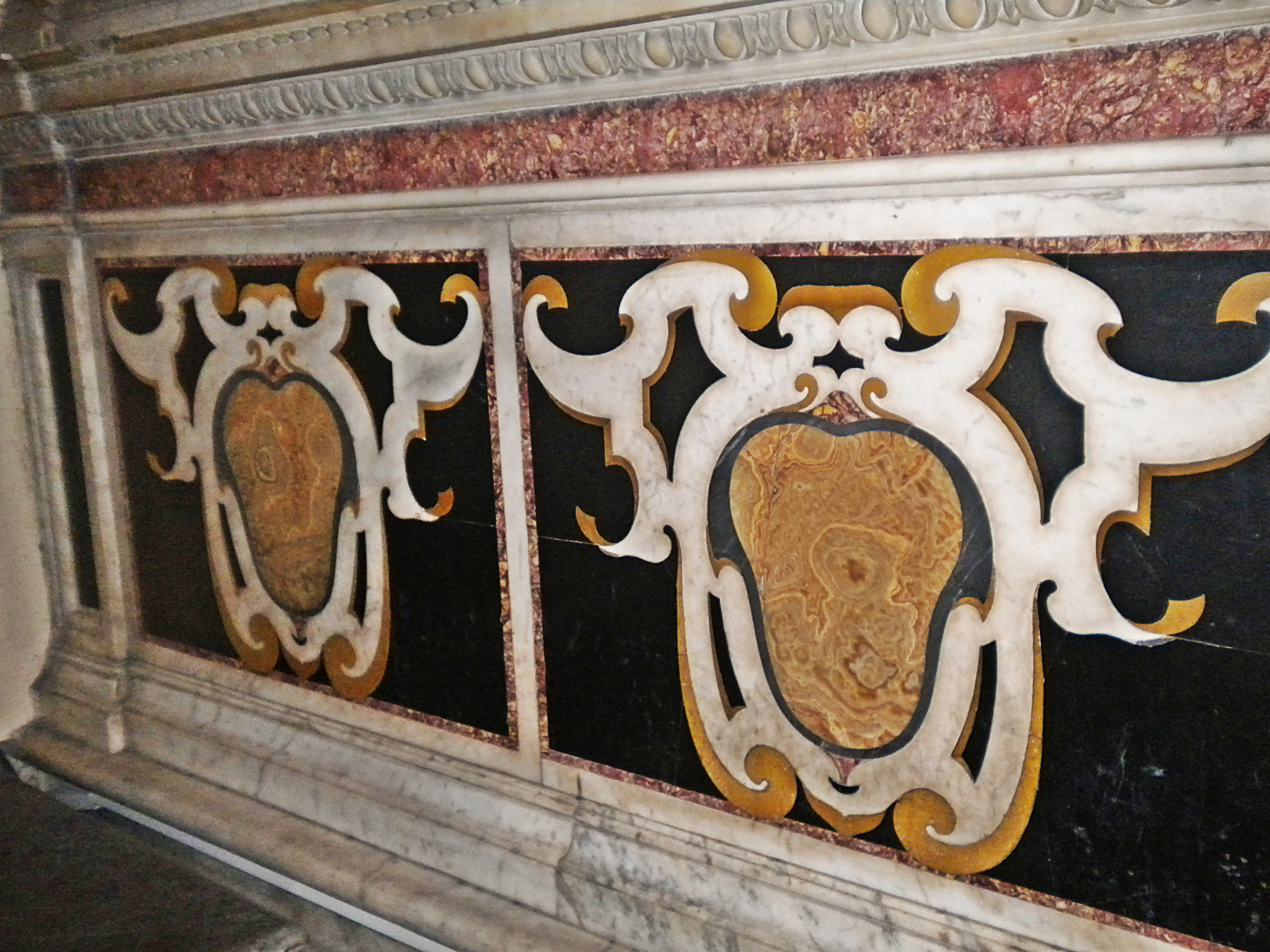
Steps

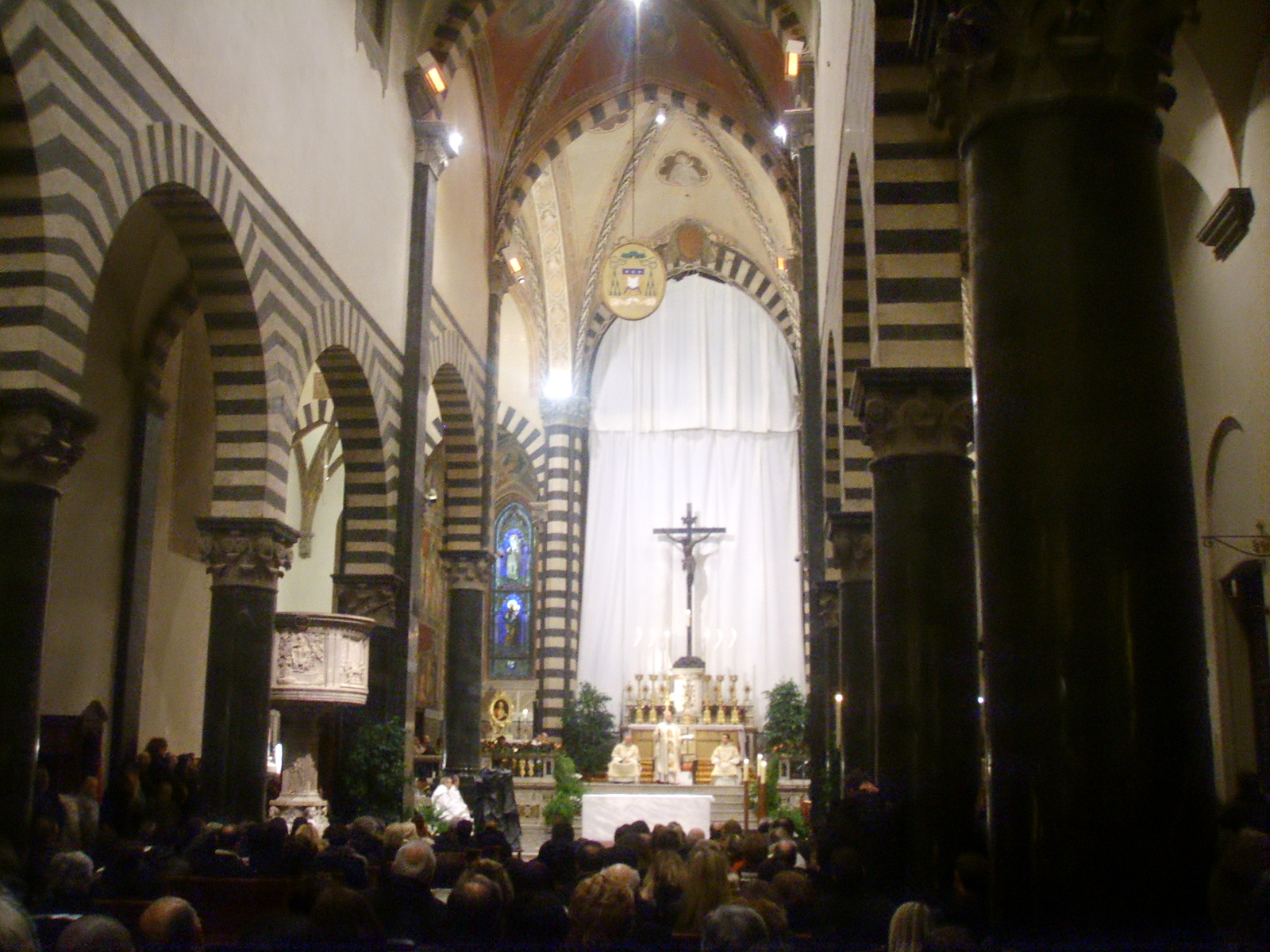
Nave

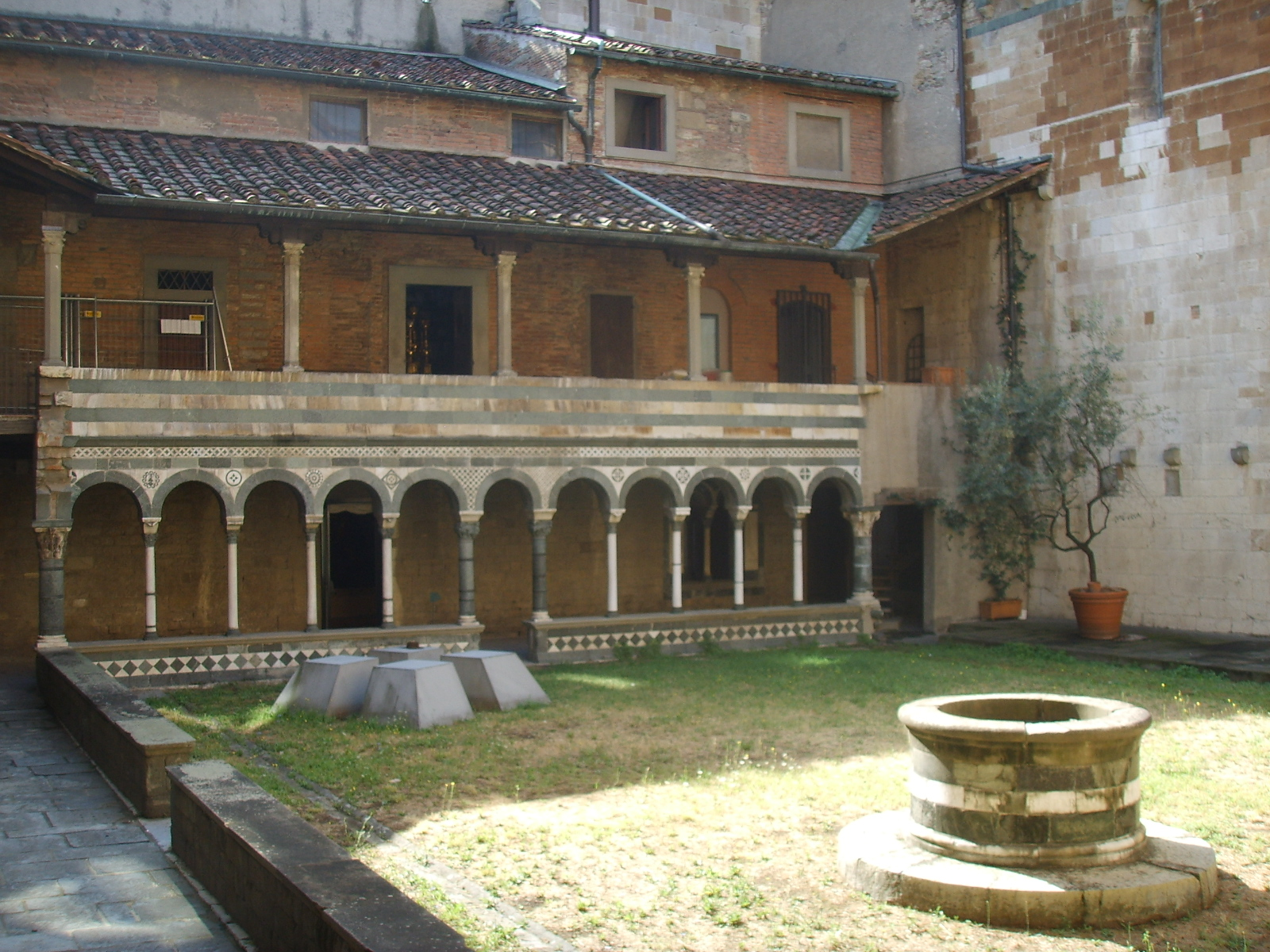
Cloister

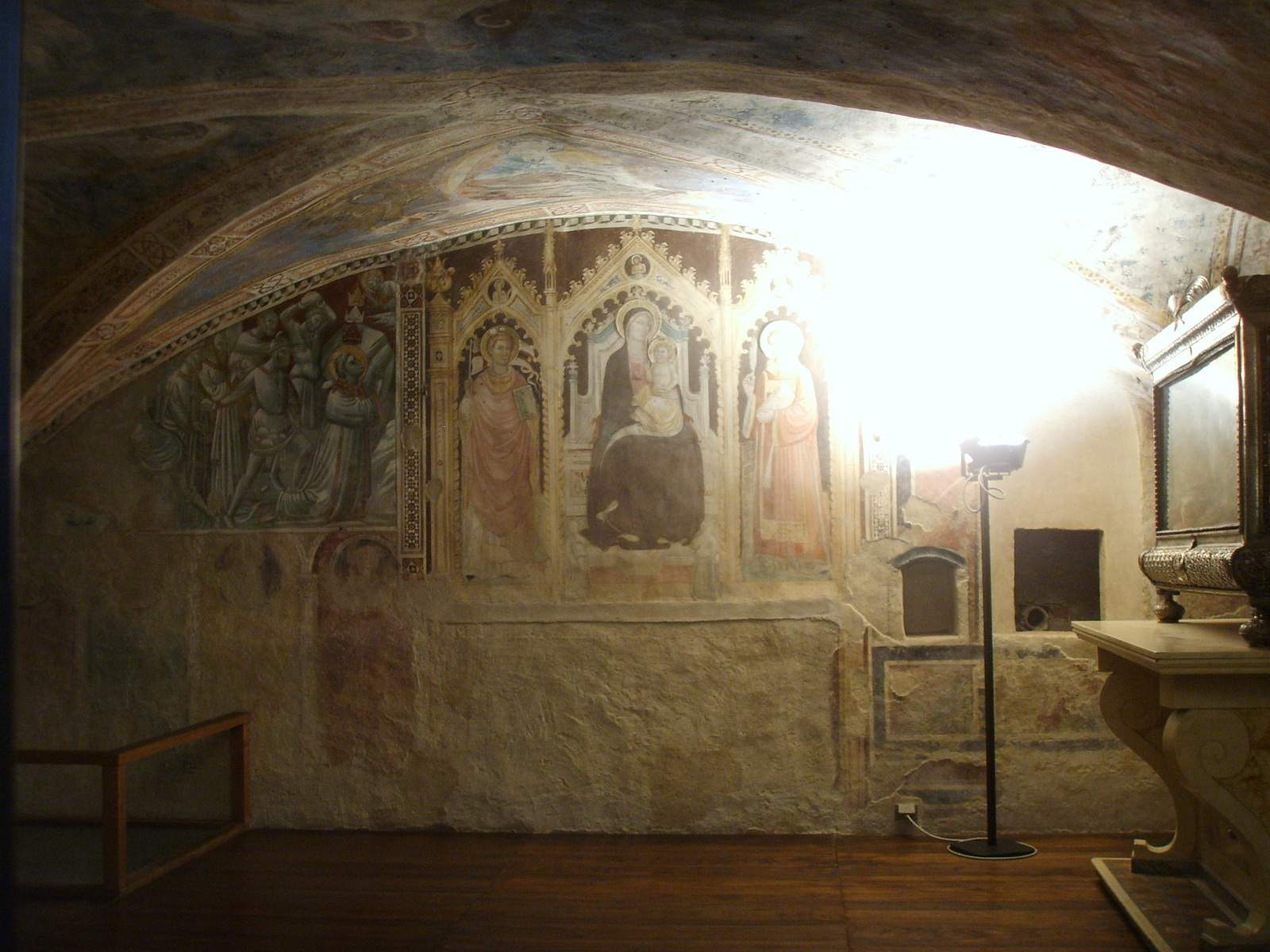
Company of Saint Stephen - underground chapel
