= Ferdinando Tacca =

Italian sculptor

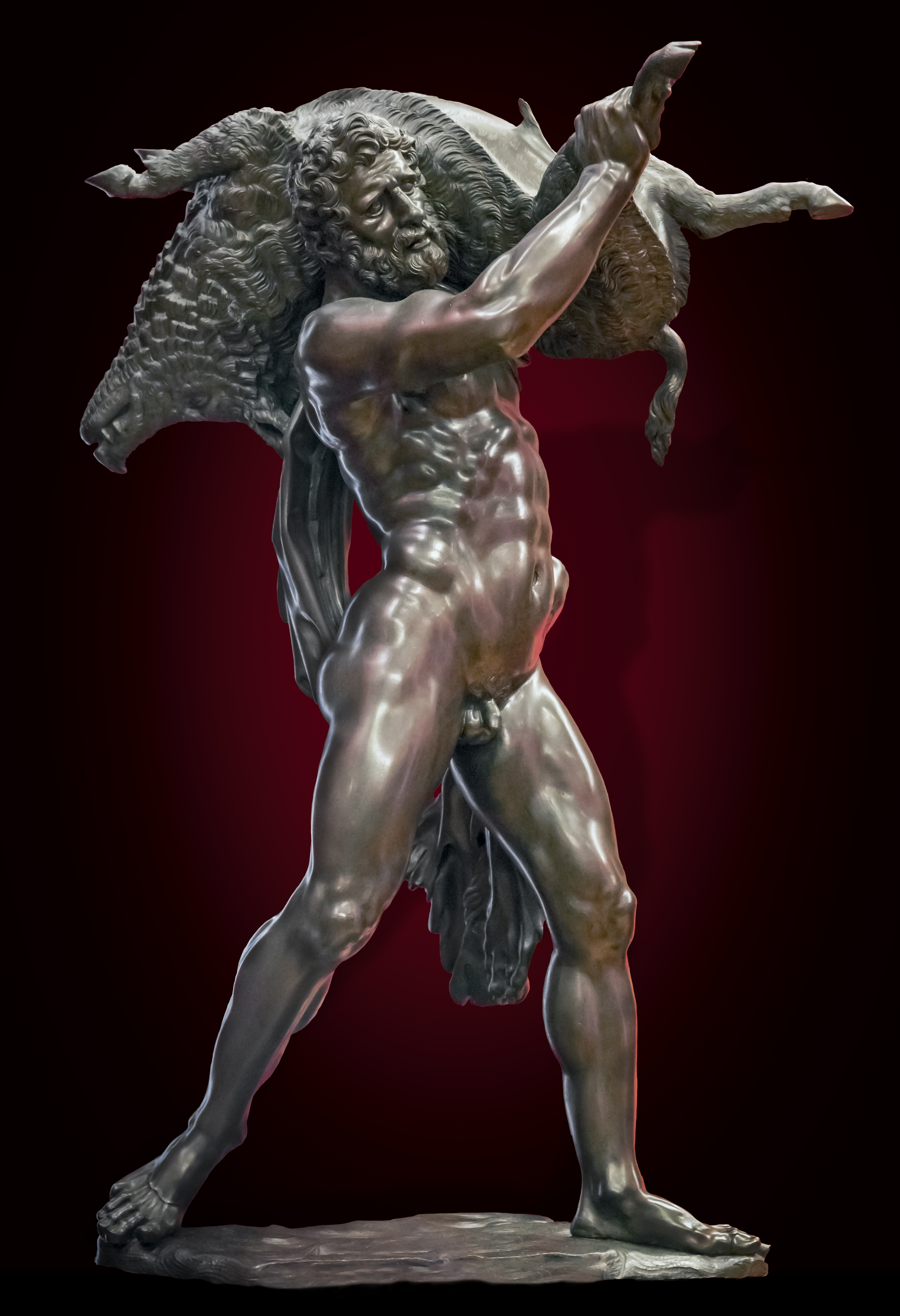
Bemberg Fondation Toulouse - Hercules and the wild boar of Erymanthus - Ferdinando Tacca.jpg

Ferdinando Tacca (1619–1686) was an Italian sculptor and architect, active during the Baroque period in Florence.

== Biography ==
He was the son of Pietro Tacca, a sculptor active for the Medici in Florence. After Pietro's death in 1640, Ferdinado inherited his studio and bronze foundry in Borgo Pinti, where he produced both large equestrian monuments, statuary, and smaller-scale works for both local and foreign patrons.

He helped complete in 1640 the bronze Equestrian Statue of King Philip IV of Spain in Madrid.

He created the Crucifix for the Cathedral of Prato and the Fontana di Bacchino, located in the city's main piazza. The fountain (1659-1665) depicts young Bacchus in bronze sitting around bunches of grapes.

After 1650, Tacca also became a prominent stage designer and engineer. After 1656, Ferdinando was appointed engineer of the Medici buildings and fortifications.

He designed the Teatro Della Pergola, built in 1656, commissioned by Cardinal Giovanni Carlo de' Medici.
