= Annunciation (disambiguation) =

The Annunciation is the biblical episode of the announcement by the archangel Gabriel to Mary that she would become the mother of Jesus.

Annunciation may also refer to:

- Annunciation to the shepherds, in which angels tell a group of shepherds about the birth of Jesus
- Annunciation to Joseph, when Joseph is told in a dream Mary has conceived by the Holy Spirit

== Paintings ==
- Annunciation (Fra Angelico, Madrid), 1425–26
- Annunciation (Fra Angelico, San Marco), c. 1450, in Florence, Italy
- Annunciation of Cortona, 1433–1434, by Fra Angelico
- Annunciation of San Giovanni Valdarno, c. 1430–1432, by Fra Angelico
- Annunciation (Antonello da Messina), 1474, in Syracuse, Italy
- Annunciation (Bellini), c. 1500, by Giovanni Bellini, in Venice, Italy
- Annunciation (Botticelli, Glasgow), 1490
- Annunciation (Botticelli, New York), c. 1485–1492
- Annunciation (Caravaggio), 1608, in Nancy, France
- Annunciation (Cima), 1495, in Saint Petersburg, Russia
- Annunciation (Correggio), 1524–25, in Parma, Italy
- The Annunciation, with Saint Emidius, 1486, by Carlo Crivelli, in London, England
- Annunciation (Artemisia Gentileschi), 1630, in Naples, Italy
- Annunciation (Orazio Gentileschi, 1600), in Newark, Delaware, US
- Annunciation (Orazio Gentileschi, 1623), in Turin, Italy
- Annunciation (El Greco, Illescas), 1603–1605
- Annunciation (El Greco, Madrid), 1609, in a private collection in Madrid, Spain
- Annunciation (El Greco, Museo Thyssen-Bornemisza), 1575–1576, in Madrid, Spain
- Annunciation (El Greco, Museo del Prado, 1600), part of the Doña María de Aragón Altarpiece
- Annunciation (El Greco, Prado, 1570), 1570, in Madrid, Spain
- Annunciation (El Greco, Sigüenza), 1614
- Annunciation (El Greco, São Paulo Museum of Art), 1600, in São Paulo, Brazil
- Annunciation (Guercino), 1646
- Annunciation (Master Jerzy), 1517, in Kraków, Poland
- Annunciation (Lanfranco, Rome), c. 1615–1624
- Annunciation (Leonardo), 1472–1475, in Florence, Italy
- Annunciation (Filippo Lippi, London), c. 1449–1459
- Annunciation (Lippi, Munich), 1443–1450, by Filippo Lippi
- Annunciation (Lippi, Rome), 1445–1450, by Filippo Lippi
- Annunciation with Two Kneeling Donors, 1440–1445, by Filippo Lippi
- Annunciation (Lochner), c. 1440, by Stefan Lochner, in Cologne, Germany
- Annunciation (Lorenzetti), 1344, in Siena, Italy
- Annunciation with St. Margaret and St. Ansanus, by Simone Martini and Lippo Memmi, in the Uffizi in Florence, Italy
- Annunciation (Masolino), c. 1423–1424 or c. 1427–1429, in Washington, D.C., US
- Annunciation (Memling), c. 1482, in New York City, New York, US
- Annunciation (Moretto), 1535–1540
- Annunciation of Fano, c. 1488–1490, by Pietro Perugino
- Annunciation (Pittoni), c. 1757
- Annunciation (Pontormo), 1528, in Florence, Italy
- Annunciation (Previtali), 1505–1510, by Andrea Previtali, in Meschio, Italy
- Annunciation (Reni), 1629
- Annunciation (Rubens), two paintings by Peter Paul Rubens
- Annunciation (Signorelli), 1491, in Volterra, Italy
- The Annunciation (Tanner), 1898, by Henry Ossawa Tanner, in Philadelphia, Pennsylvania, US
- Annunciation (church of San Salvador), 1559–64, by Titian, in Venice, Italy
- Annunciation (Uccello), c. 1425
- Annunciation (van Eyck, Madrid), 1434–36
- Annunciation (van Eyck, Washington), 1434–36
- Annunciation (Veronese, Uffizi), c. 1556, by Paolo Veronese, in Florence, Italy
- Annunciation (Wautier), 1659, by Michaelina Wautier, in Marly-le-Roi, France
- Annunciation Triptych (Lorenzo Monaco)
- Annunciation Triptych (van der Weyden)
- Ustyug Annunciation, 12th-century Russian Orthodox icon from Novgorod

== Sculptures ==
- Annunciation (Vittoria), c. 1583, by Alessandro Vittoria, in Chicago, Illinois, US

== Film ==
- The Annunciation (film), a 1984 Hungarian film directed by András Jeles

== Music ==
- Annunciation (album), a 1994 album by the Subdudes

== See also ==
- Enunciation, announcing, proclaiming, or making known
- Annunciade, several religious and military orders
- Annunciation Church (disambiguation)
- Annunciation School (disambiguation)
- Annunciation Monastery (disambiguation)
- Annunciation Bridge, across the Neva River in Saint Petersburg, Russia
