= Annunciation School =

Annunciation School may refer to:

- Annunciation School (Buffalo, New York), a historic building formerly used as a school, Buffalo, New York, U.S.
- Annunciation School (New York City), a K-8 Catholic school, New York City, New York, U.S.
- Annunciation Catholic Church shooting, a shooting next to the Annunciation Catholic school, Minneapolis, Minnesota, U.S.

== See also ==
- Annunciation (disambiguation)
- Annunciation High School (Detroit), Michigan, U.S. Now closed
- Annunciation Orthodox School, a Greek Orthodox school in Houston, Texas, U.S.
