= Palazzo Lantieri, Siracusa =

Butterfly nebula

Palazzo Lantieri
- Interactive map of the Palazzo Lantieri area

General information
- Type: Palace
- Architectural style: Baroque
- Location: Via Roma corner Via Capodieci, Ortigia, Siracusa, Sicily, Italy
- Coordinates: 37°03′28″N 15°17′42″E

Palazzo Lantiere is a palace, with a main facade on Via Roma #152-158, in the island of Ortigia in Siracusa, region of Sicily, Italy. A few houses east of Palazzo Bellomo on Via Roma, it presently serves as bed and breakfast.

== Description ==
The two story palace putatively is named after a Genoese merchant family settling in medieval Siracusa. It has been rebuilt many times over the centuries, and has served in prior centuries as a hospital. The palace has sculpted brackets supporting the balconies on Via Roma. A small portion and corner of the palace on Via Capodieci is decorated with 16th-century grotesque masks and fanciful decorations.
