= Stanisław Borek House =

Coordinates: 50°03′13″N 19°56′06″E

House of Stanisław Borek
- Dom Stanisława Borka (Polish)
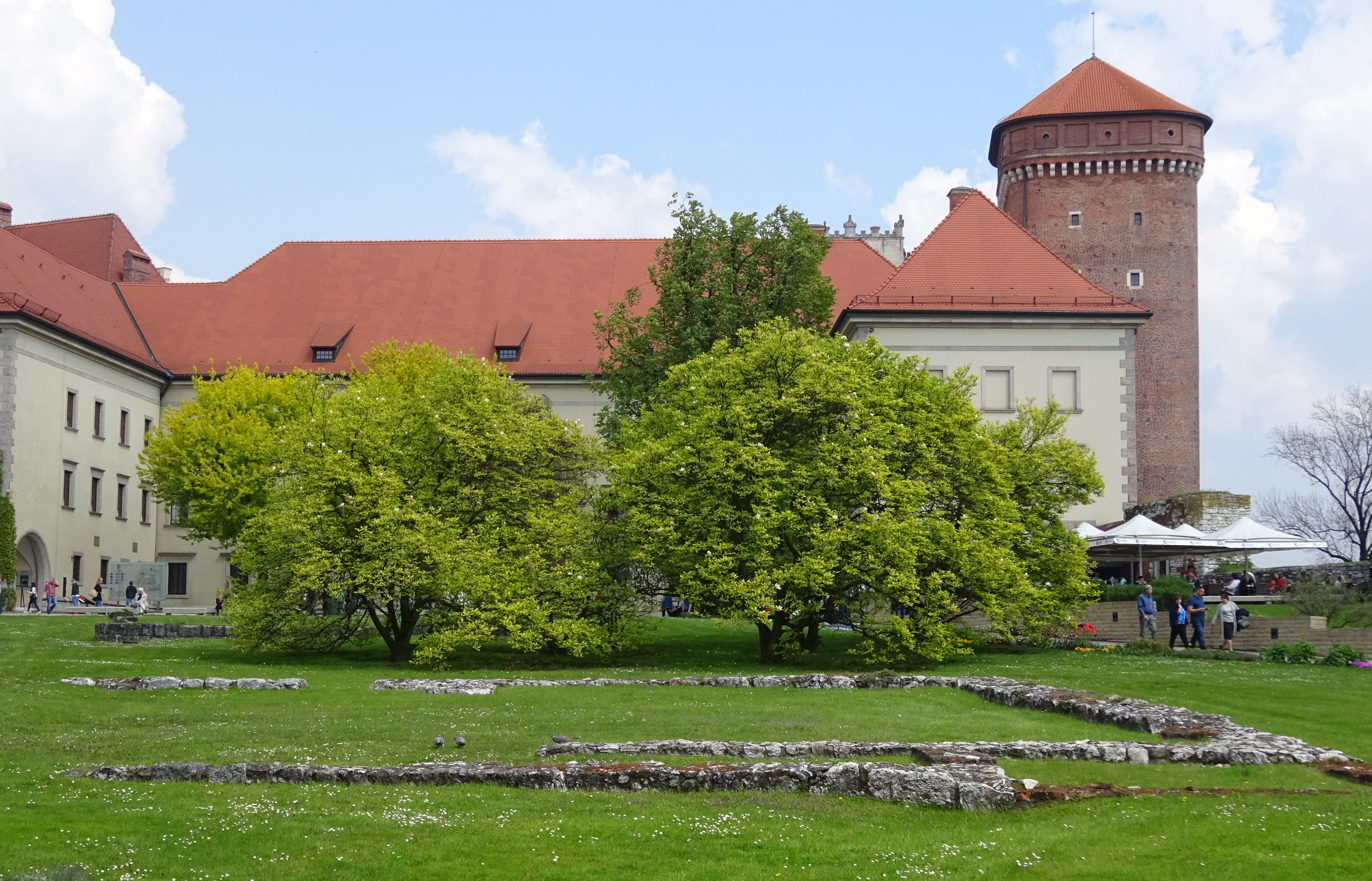
- Remains of the foundations of the house inside the grounds of Wawel

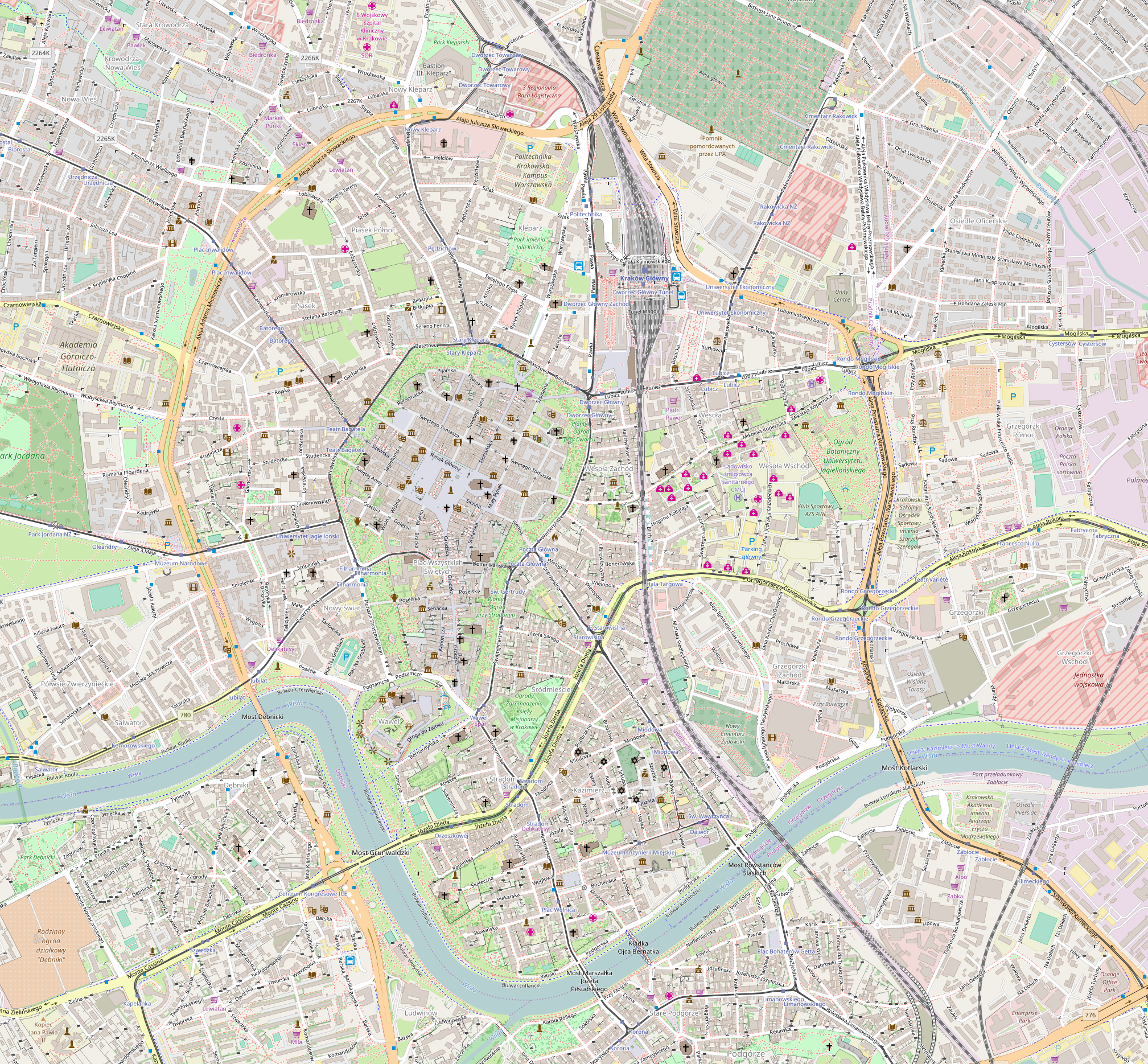
- Location within Central Kraków
- Location: Wawel Castle, Kraków, Poland

History
- Built: 1551; 475 years ago
- Built for: Stanisław Borek
- Demolished: 1848; 178 years ago

Map with the location of Stanisław Borek's House (in red) on Wawel Hill

The House of Stanisław Borek (Polish: Dom Stanisława Borka) was a residence at Wawel Castle in Kraków, Poland.

It was constructed in 1551 for the canon Stanisław Borka, who was a diplomat and secretary of King Sigismund I the Old. Only its foundations are left remaining and there are intentions to reconstruct it.

== See also ==
- St George's Chapel, Wawel Castle
- St Michael's Chapel, Wawel Castle

== Literature ==
- Kazimierz Kuczman, Wzgórze Wawelskie: Przewodnik; [Państwowe Zbiory Sztuki na Wawelu, Ministerstwo Kultury i Sztuki, Zarząd Muzeów i Ochrony Zabytków], Kraków 1988, wyd. drugie.
