= Annunciation (Master Jerzy) =

Painting by Master Jerzy

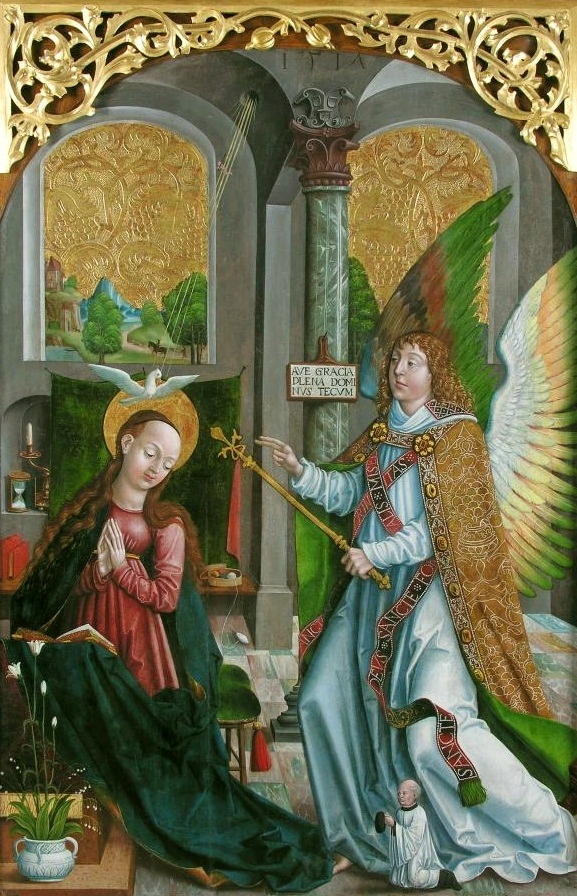

Annunciation is a 1517 tempera painting on panel by Master Jerzy, who signed it with the letter G (Georgius, the Latin form of his name). It is now in the Czartoryski Museum in Kraków.

It is the central panel from a triptych produced for St. Michael's Chapel, Wawel Castle – the side panels of the same altarpiece are now kept in św. Krzyża (Holy Cross) church in Kraków. All three panels were commissioned by the priest Jakub Monopedes, who is shown kneeling at Gabriel's feet, whilst Gabriel's stole shows a fragment of the text of a funeral prayer said on Good Friday, anticipating Christ's future Passion.
