= Master Jerzy =

Polish painter

Master Jerzy, Jerzy, Georgius or Jurek Almanus was a guild painter of unknown origin, active in Kraków between 1501 and 1520. He was a pupil of Joachim Libnaw of Drossen. In 1513 he joined the Kraków city guild and in 1520 he joined the senior painters' guild (according to the Kraków Encyclopedia in 1518 he left Kraków due to a dispute).

His only surviving signed work is Annunciation (1517, Czartoryski Museum, Kraków). Based on a stylistic-comparative analysis, he is also credited with two other paintings: a votive image of Krzysztof Szydłowiecki for the collegiate church of St. Marcin's in Opatów – Saint. Anna Samotrzecia (1519, National Museum in Kraków), and the Image of Our Lady of Sorrows, called the Smętna Dobrodziejka in the Franciscan church in Kraków.
