= St. George's Chapel, Wawel Castle =

Church in Kraków, Poland

Coordinates: 50°03′13″N 19°56′05″E

Map with the location of St George's Chapel (in red) on Wawel Hill

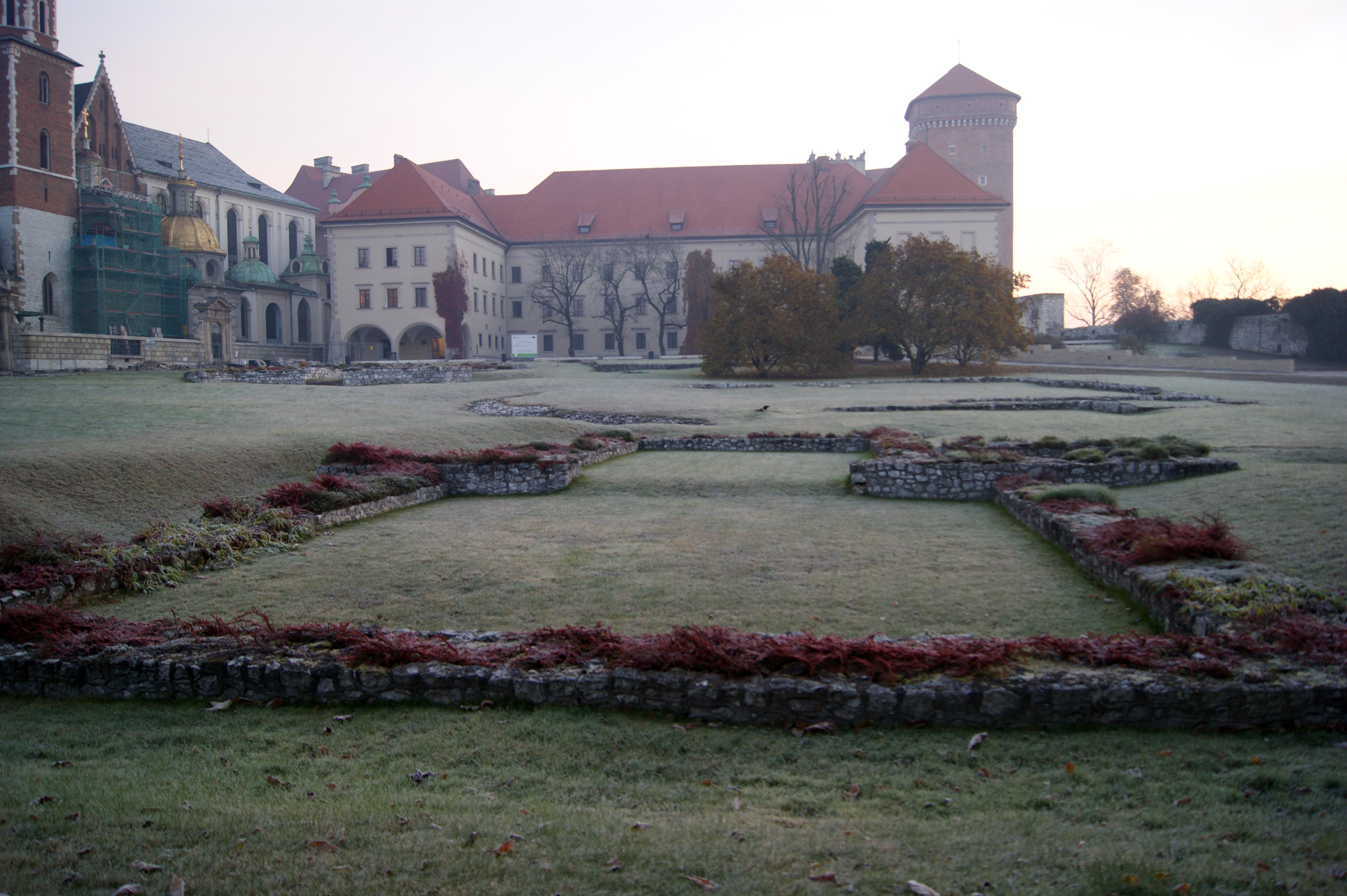
Remains of the chapel (2010)

St. George's Chapel (Polish: Kaplica św. Jerzego) was a place of worship at Wawel Castle in Kraków, Poland. It was both a royal chapel and the chapel of the commoners. The chapel was governed by the dean and canons of Wawel.

The chapel was located in the outer courtyard of the castle hill. There are not many historical sources. One of the earliest sources mentions it as a chapel of the fortification. The chapel's first mention was around 1243 and the brick structure dates to the reign of King Casimir III the Great. It consisted of one nave with a rectangular sanctuary from the east and vestry to the south. At the nave was a large crypt.

It was demolished during the Austrian rule in 1804, when the occupying garrison created a large space to hold their drills. The remains of the chapel were excavated after World War II. There are intentions to reconstruct the chapel.

== See also ==
- St. Michael's Chapel
- Stanisław Borek House
