= Annunciation (Memling) =

Painting by Hans Memling

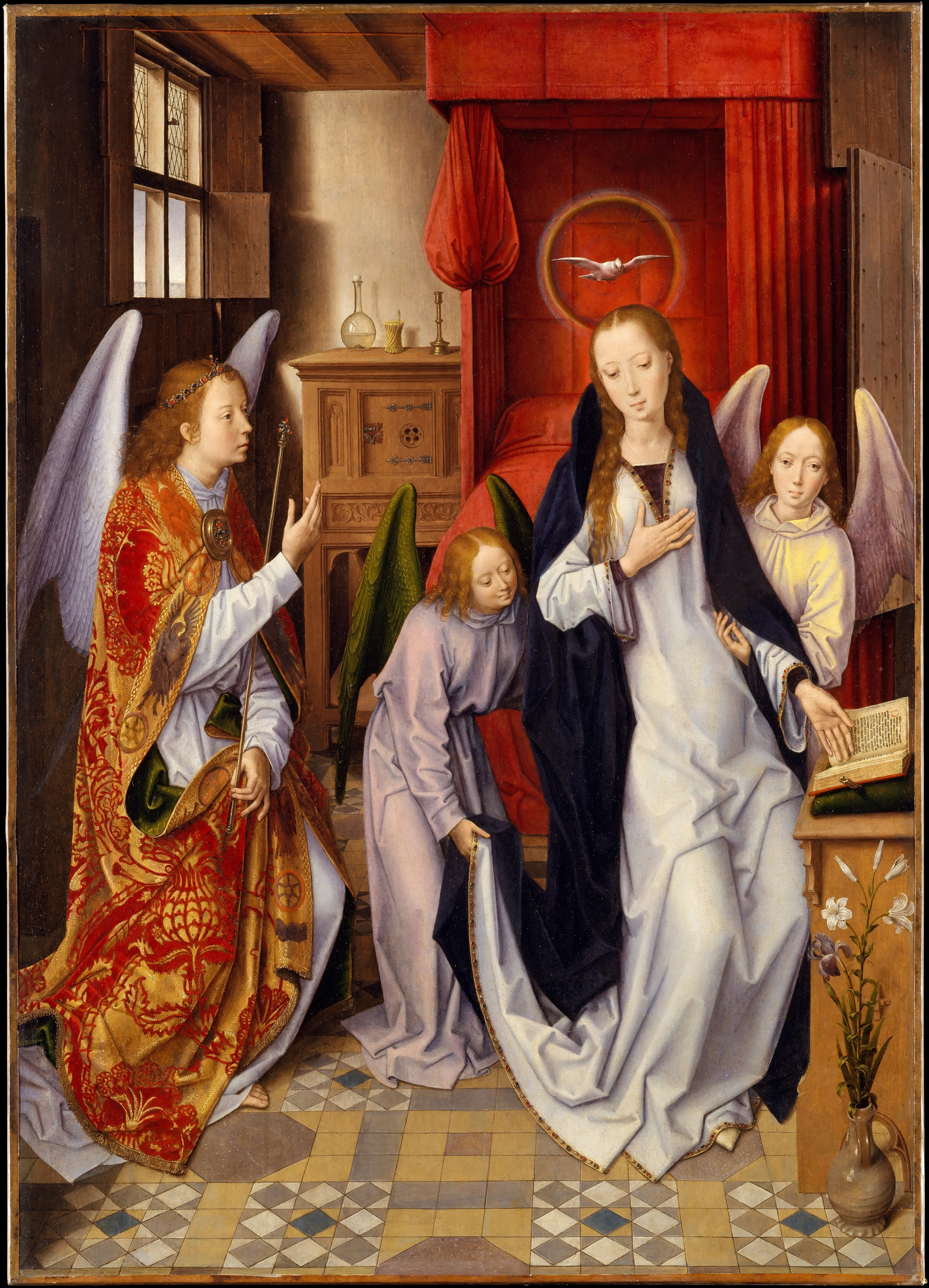
The Annunciation, 76.5 × 54.6 cm (30 1/8 × 21 1/2 in.), Hans Memling, 1480s, oil on panel (transferred to canvas), Metropolitan Museum of Art, New York

The Annunciation is a panel-painting by the Early Netherlandish artist Hans Memling. It depicts the Annunciation as the archangel Gabriel's announces to the Virgin Mary that she will conceive and become the mother of Jesus, as described in the Gospel of Luke. The painting was executed in the 1480s and transferred to canvas from its original oak panel sometime after 1928. It is today held in the Robert Lehman collection at the Metropolitan Museum of Art in New York.

The panel shows Mary in a domestic interior with two attendant angels. Gabriel is dressed in ecclesiastical robes, while a dove hovers above Mary, representing the Holy Spirit. It expands upon the Annunciation wing of Rogier van der Weyden's Saint Columba Altarpiece of c. 1455. According to the art historian Maryan Ainsworth, the work is a "startlingly original image, rich in connotations for the viewer or worshiper".

The iconography focuses on the Virgin's purity. Her swoon foreshadows the Crucifixion of Jesus, and the panel emphasizes her role as mother, bride, and Queen of Heaven. The original frame survived until the 19th century and was inscribed with a date believed to be 1482; modern art historians have suggested that the number's final digit was a 9, which would give a date of 1489. In 1847, the art historian Gustav Friedrich Waagen described the panel as one of Memling's "finest and most original works". In 1902, it was exhibited in Bruges at the Exposition des primitifs flamands à Bruges, after which it underwent cleaning and restoration. The banker Philip Lehman bought it in 1920 from the Radziwiłł family, in whose collection it might have been since the 16th century; Antoni Radziwiłł discovered it on a family estate in the early 19th century. At that time, it had been pierced through with an arrow and required restoration.

== Description ==
=== Subject ===
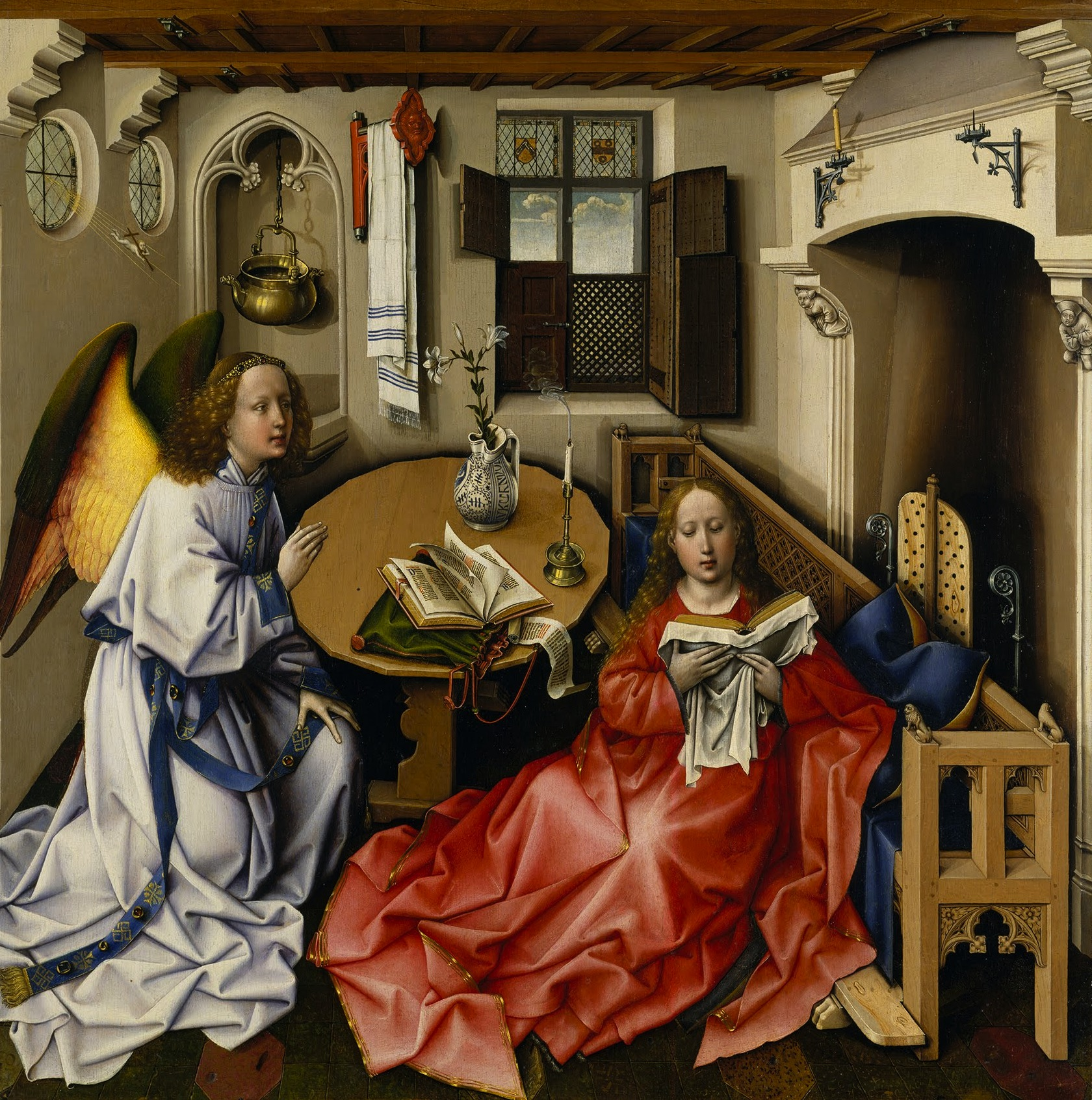
Robert Campin's c. 1420s Mérode Altarpiece, (The Cloisters), with conventional iconography of a hearth and a vase of flowers

The Annunciation was a popular theme in European art, although a difficult scene to paint, because it depicts Mary's union with Christ as she becomes the tabernacle for the Word made flesh. The doctrine of Mary as Theotokos, the God-bearer, was affirmed in 431 at the Council of Ephesus; two decades later the Council of Chalcedon affirmed the doctrine of Incarnation – that Christ was of two natures (God and Man) – and Mary's perpetual virginity was affirmed at the Lateran Council of 631. In Byzantine art, Annunciation scenes depict the Virgin enthroned and dressed in royal regalia. In later centuries she was shown in enclosed spaces: the temple, the church, the garden.

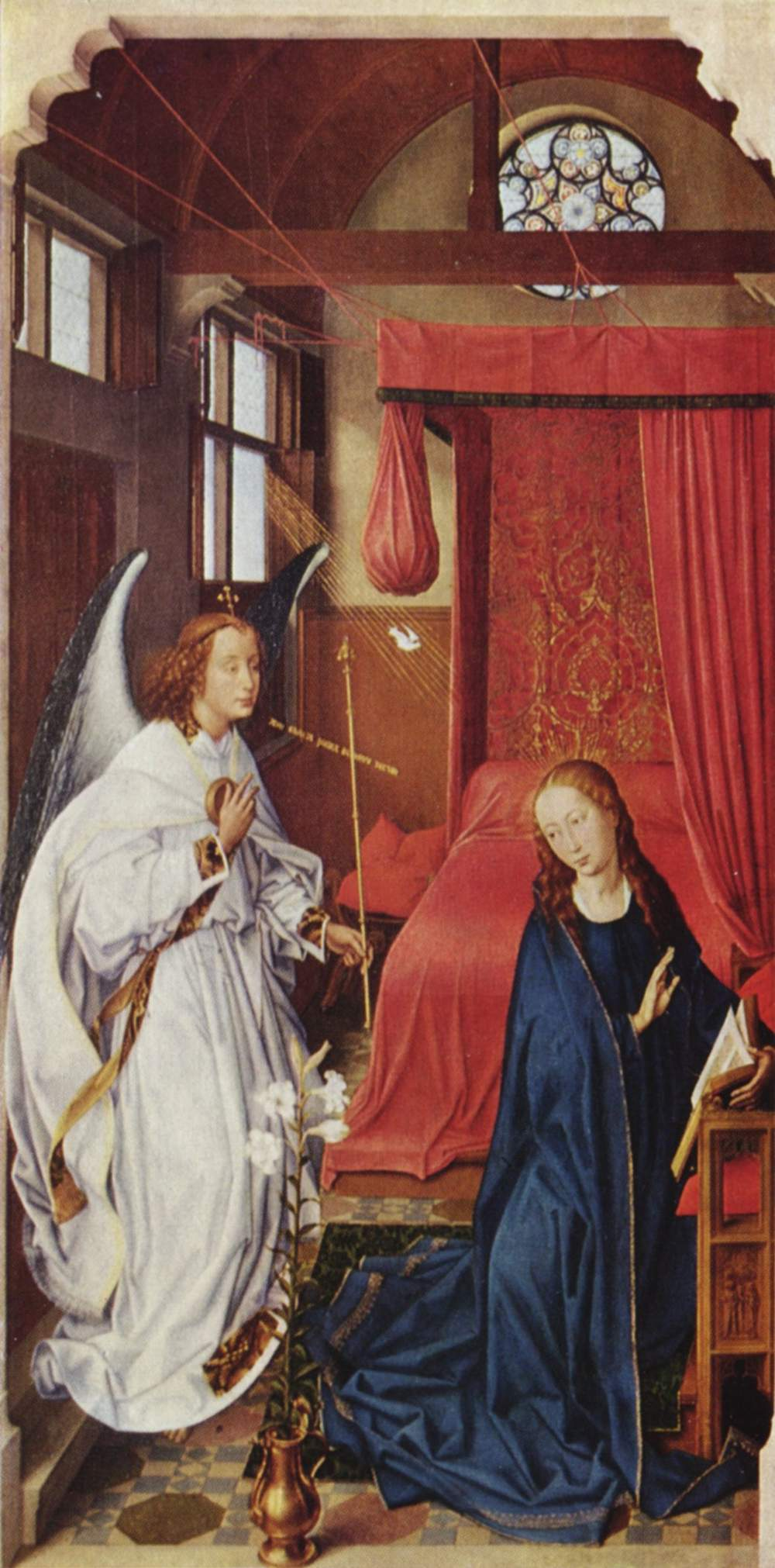
Left panel of Rogier van der Weyden's Saint Columba altarpiece, c. 1455, Alte Pinakothek, Munich. Rays of light stream through the open window toward the Virgin.

In Early Netherlandish art the Annunciation is typically set in contemporary domestic interiors, a motif and tradition established by Robert Campin, and followed by Jan van Eyck and Rogier van der Weyden. Neither Campin nor van Eyck went so far as to set the scene in a bedchamber, although the motif is found in van der Weyden's Louvre Annunciation of c. 1435 and his Saint Columba Altarpiece of c. 1455, in which the Virgin kneels by the nuptial bed, rendered in red made from costly pigments. Memling's depiction of the scene is nearly identical to that in the Saint Columba Altarpiece.

=== Figures ===
The archangel Gabriel appears before Mary to announce that she will bear the Son of God. He is shown standing in a three-quarter view, wearing a small jeweled diadem and dressed in vestments. He has a richly embroidered red-and-gold brocade cope, edged with a pattern of gray seraphim and wheels, over a white alb and amice. He holds his staff of office in one hand, and raises the other towards the Virgin. He bends his knees, honoring and acknowledging her as Mother of Christ and Queen of Heaven, and his feet are bare and positioned slightly behind hers.

The Virgin is in a frontal view; directly behind her the red-curtained bed acts as a framing device, similar to the traditional canopy of honor or baldachin. Unlike in the work of Memling's predecessors, whose Virgins are garbed in heavily jeweled and costly robes, the plain white shift she wears beneath a blue mantle is minimally jeweled at the hem and at the open neckline. A purple underdress peeks out at her neck and wrists, indicating her royal status. Mary seems neither surprised nor fearful at the announcement; according to the art historian Shirley Neilsen Blum the scene is rendered with a great sense of naturalism and successfully depicts "the transformation of Mary from girl to God-bearer".

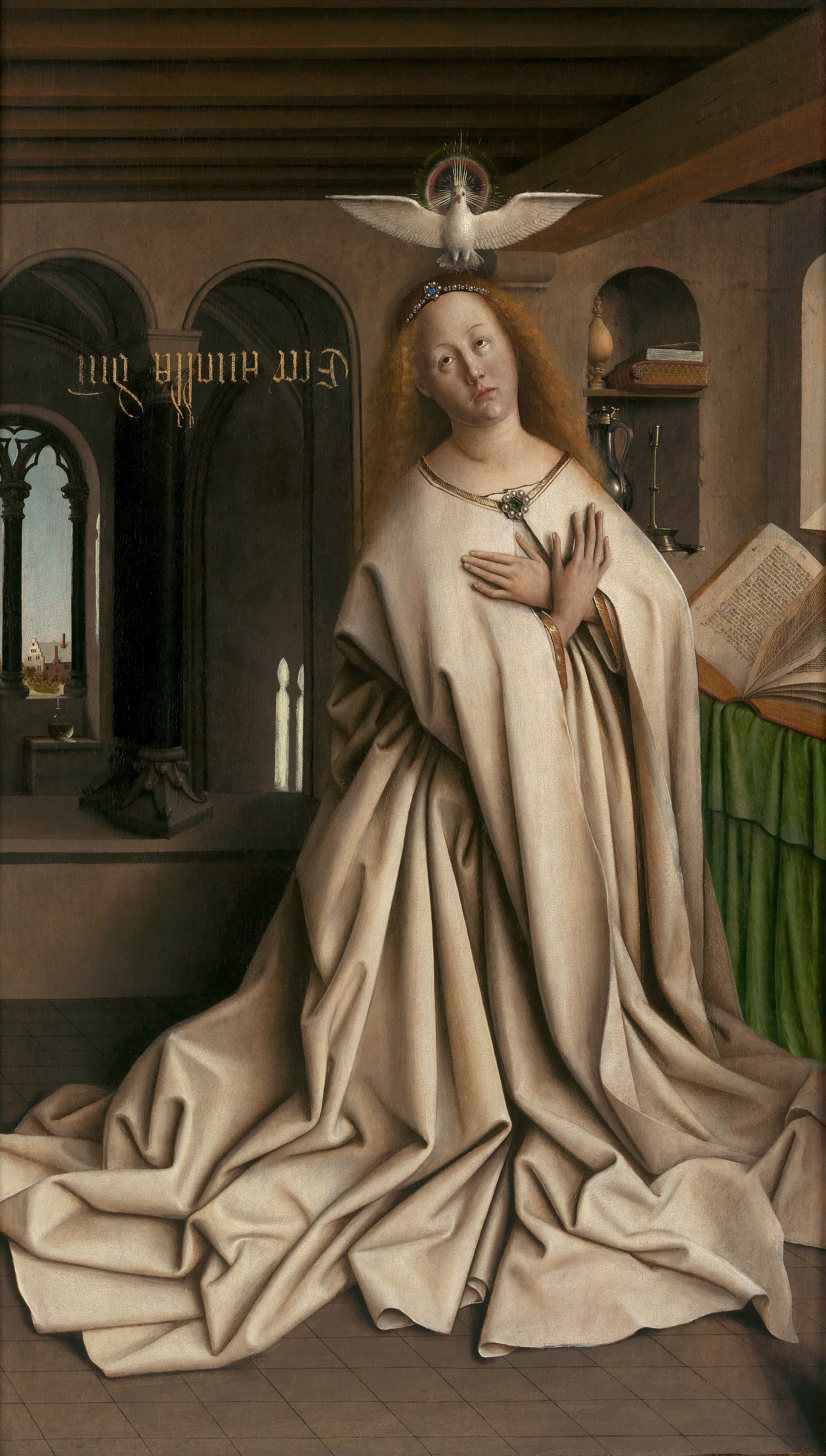
Jan van Eyck's Annunciation, from the 1432 Ghent Altarpiece, has an inscription streaming towards the Virgin and the dove of the Holy Spirit hovers above.

The Virgin holds an innovative and unusual position. She seems to be either rising or swooning as if having lost her balance, a divergence from her conventional seated or kneeling pose. Blum believes "one may search in vain in other Netherlandish Annunciation panels of the fifteenth century of a Virgin positioned as she is here". The art historian Penny Jolly suggests that the painting shows a birthing position, a motif with which van der Weyden experimented in his Seven Sacraments Altarpiece, where the Virgin's collapse results in a childbirth-like posture, and in his Descent from the Cross, which has Mary Magdalene bending and crouching – similar to the position Memling's Magdalene assumes in his Lamentation. Flanking the Virgin, and holding her, are two attendant angels. The one to the left lifts the Virgin's robe while the other gazes at the viewer, "soliciting our response", according to Ainsworth. Both are small-statured, solemn, and, according to Blum, in mood "comparable to that of Gabriel". Other than the presence of the angels, Memling shows a typical upper-merchant-class 15th-century Flemish bedchamber.

=== Objects ===
A dove, representing the Holy Spirit, hovers inside a rainbow-hued circle of light directly above the Virgin's head. Its placement and size are unusual for art of the period. It is unlike anything found in van der Weyden, and is never repeated in Memling's work, but reminiscent of van Eyck's dove in the Ghent Altarpiece's Annunciation panel. Its shape is found in medallions hung above beds at that time, and thus seems in keeping with the domestic interior. Mary's left hand rests on an open prayer book, which she has propped open on a prie-dieu, with the letter "D" visible – perhaps for Deus tecum ("the Lord be with you"), according to Ainsworth. Blum speculates that the passage is from Isaiah 7:14, "Behold a Virgin shall conceive and bear a son". A vase containing white lilies and a single blue iris is next to it on the floor.

A curtain sack, commonly found on beds of the period, hangs in the central axis between Gabriel and the attendant angel. A sideboard beside the bed contains two types of candles and a flask of water standing in bright light falling from the window to the left. The floor is multi-colored tile-work, similar to that in van der Weyden's Saint Columba Altarpiece; Memling truncates the ceiling rafters in the mid-ground, at the end of the bed, with the floor extending into the foreground. Blum describes the effect as acting "like an open stage for the holy figures".

== Iconography ==
The iconography is not overly labored, and Memling avoids extraneous symbolism. Many elements emphasize Mary's role as the Mother of God; the chamber is furnished with simple everyday objects that indicate her purity. The vase of lilies and the items on the sideboard are objects 15th-century viewers would have associated with her. White lilies were often used to signify her purity, while irises or sword lilies were used as metaphors for her suffering. Memling emphasizes symbols associated with her womb and virginity, "introduces two additional angelic priests, and floods the room with natural light, thereby rearranging the anecdotal to emphasize the doctrinal meaning". Charles Sterling describes the work as "one of the finest examples of Memling's ability to take a pictorial convention inherited from his predecessors and infuse it with a heightened sense of emotion and narrative complexity".

=== Light ===
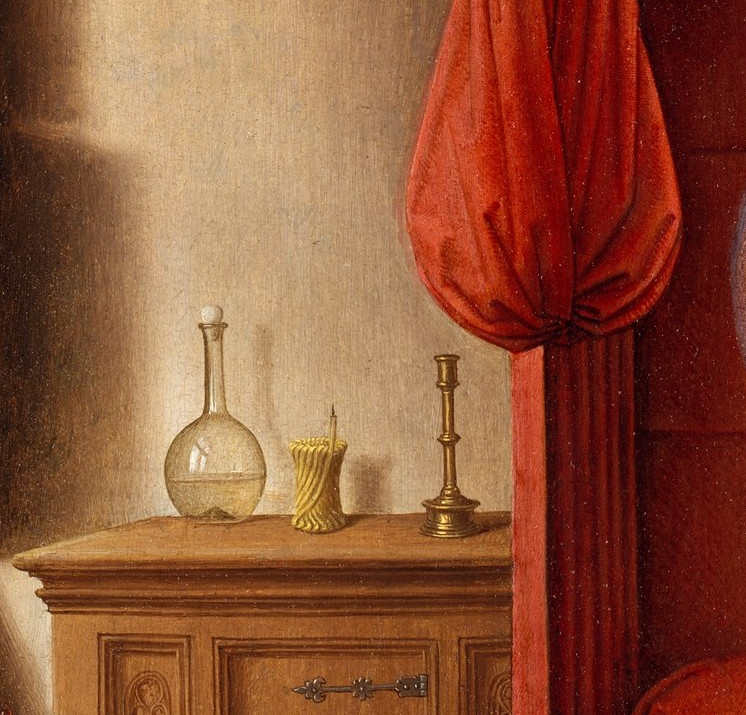
Detail showing the light shining on the sideboard, a flask of clear water, a ropewick light, a candlestick, and a curtain-sack

From the 9th century Light became associated with Mary and the Incarnation. Millard Meiss notes that from the 12th century a common way to convey the conception was to compare light passing through glass to the passage of the Holy Spirit through the body of the Virgin. Saint Bernard likened it to sunshine, explaining in this passage: "Just as the brilliance of the sun fills and penetrates a glass window without damaging it, and pierces its solid form with imperceptible subtlety, neither hurting when entering nor destroying when emerging; thus the word of God, the splendor of the Father, entered the virgin chamber and then came forth from the closed womb."

Three objects on the bedside cabinet represent the Virgin's purity: the water flask, the candleholder, and the ropewick light. The light passing through the glass of the womb-shaped flask symbolizes her flesh, pierced by divine light; its clear and undisturbed water represents her purity at the moment of conception, a device found also in the earlier paintings as a metaphor of the Virgin's sanctity. The flask shows a reflection of the window's crossbar as a cross, a symbol of the Crucifixion – another small detail in which Memling "lays one translucent symbolic form upon another".

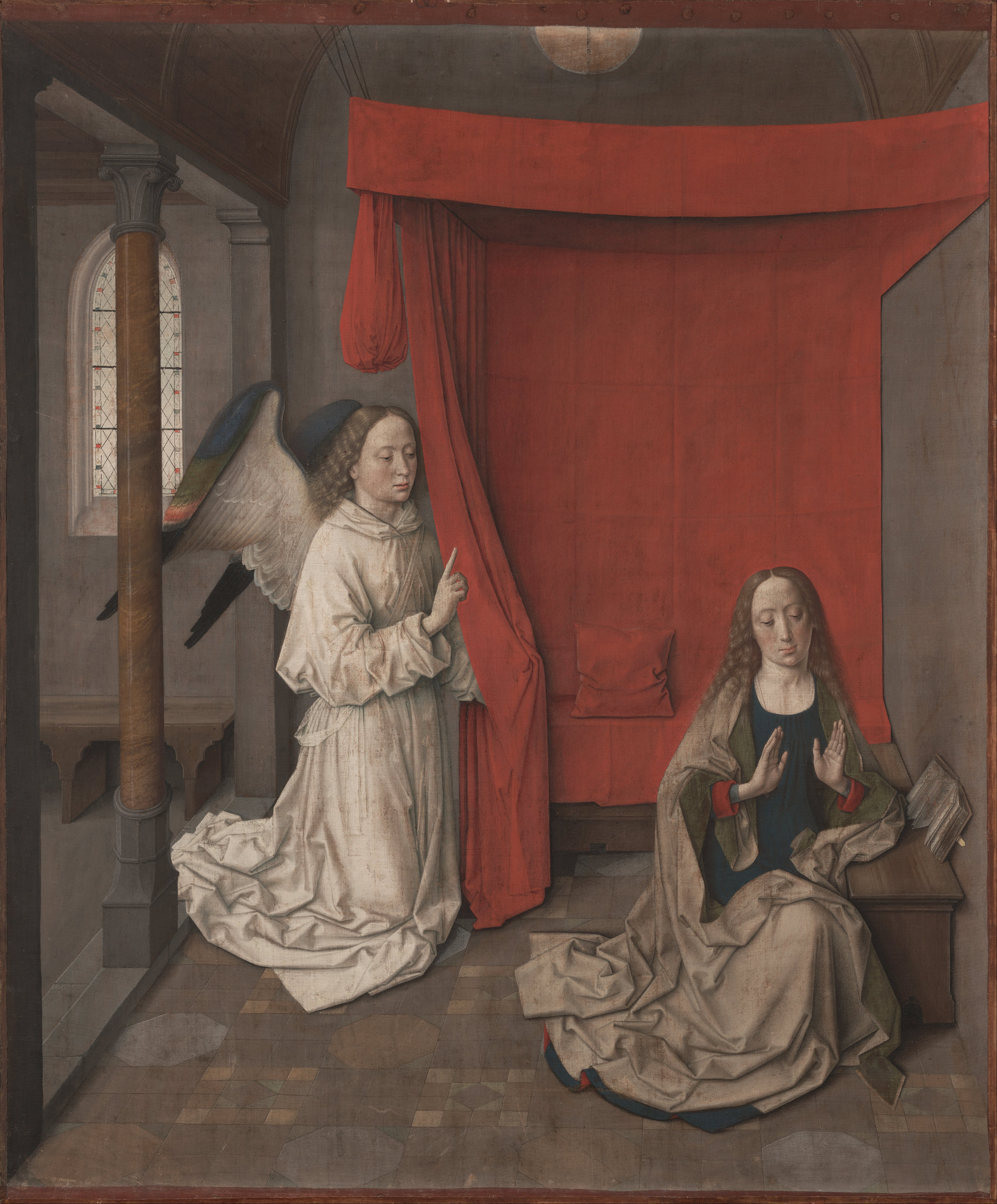
Dieric Bouts's Annunciation, c. 1450s, Getty Center, Los Angeles, omits rays of light.

Light represented by candles was then often used to symbolise the Virgin and Christ; both Campin and van Eyck placed hearths or candles in their annunciation scenes. The candleholder without a candle and the ropewick without flame symbolize the world before Christ's Nativity and the presence of his divine light, according to Ainsworth.

The challenge for painters of the Annunciation was how to visually represent the Incarnation, the Word made flesh, or Logos. They often showed rays of light emanating from Gabriel or a nearby window entering Mary's body to depict the concept of Christ "who inhabited and passed through her body". The light rays might sometimes include an inscription, and were sometimes shown entering her ear, in the belief that it was thus the Word became flesh.

Memling did not depict the light as distinct rays, nor had Dieric Bouts's Getty Annunciation. Yet the room is bright, filled with sunlight, a fenestra incarnationis, which would have been an adequate symbol for the contemporary viewer. By the mid-15th century the Virgin is found depicted in a room or chamber near an open window to permit the passage of light. Memling's room, with its window through which light streams, is a most "decorous sign of Mary's chastity", according to Blum. There are no word scrolls or banderoles to indicate the Virgin's acceptance, yet her consent is obvious through her pose, which seems, according to Sterling, both submissive and active.

=== Mother of Christ ===
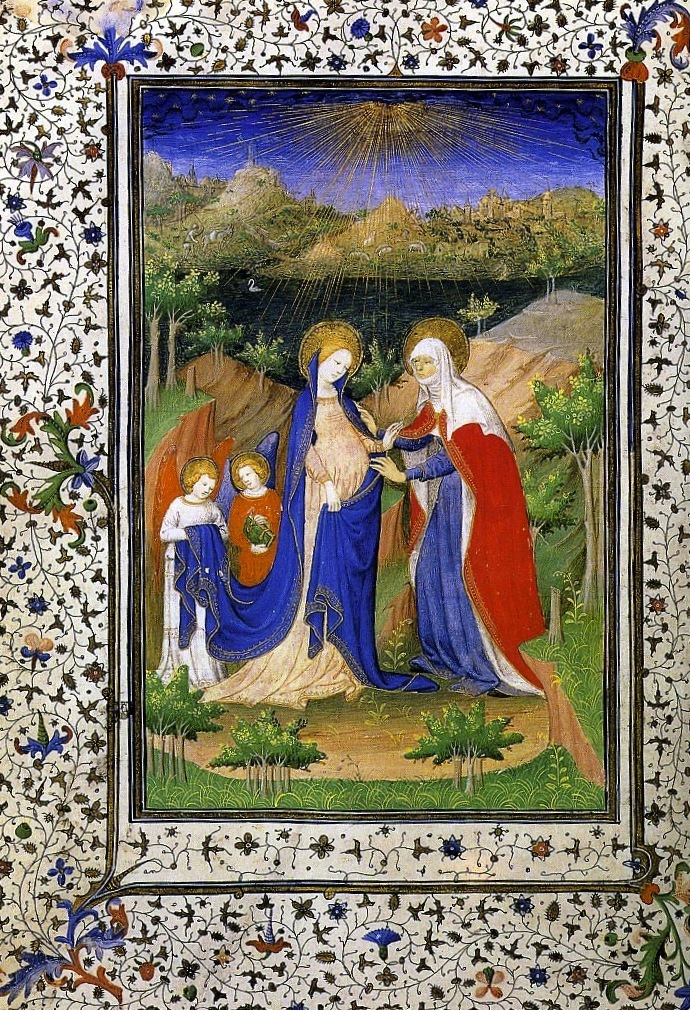
The Boucicaut Master's "Visitation" (c. 1405) is a rare example of Mary with attendant angels who touch her garments.

The Virgin birth is indicated by the red bed and red womb-shaped curtain-sack. During the early 15th century hanging beds or curtain-sacks became symbols of the Incarnation, and "served to affirm [Christ's] humanity". Blum notes that at a time "when artists did not hesitate to depict the breast of the Virgin, Memling did not shun her womb". Christ's humanity was a source of fascination, and it was only in Netherlandish art that a solution was found for visualizing his embryonic state with curtain-sacks draped to suggest the shape of a womb.

Mary's body becomes the tabernacle holding the Host made flesh. She becomes an object of devotion, a "monstrance containing the Host". Her full belly and the presence of the dove indicate that the moment of Incarnation has occurred. Viewers would have been reminded of the Crucifixion and Lamentation with the swoon, "thus anticipating Christ's sacrifice for the salvation of mankind at the moment of his conception". According to theologians, Mary stood with dignity at the Crucifixion of Jesus, but in 15th-century art she is depicted swooning, according to Jolly, "in agony at the sight of her dying son ... assuming the pose of a mother in the throes of the pain of childbirth". At the cross she felt the pain of his death, pain which at his birth she had not experienced.

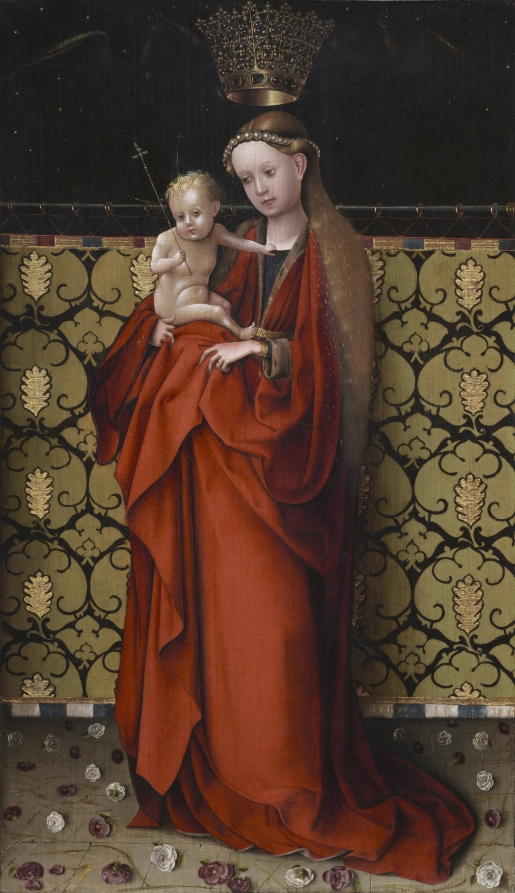
Stefan Lochner, The Virgin Crowned by Angels, c. 1450, Cleveland Museum of Art, depicts the Virgin as Queen of Heaven with two barely visible attendant angels hovering above her crown.

The painting's domestic setting belies its liturgical meaning. The dove is a reminder of the Eucharist and Mass. Lotte Brand Philip observes how throughout the 15th century "eucharistic vessels made in the form of doves and suspended over altars ... were lowered at the moment of transubstantiation"; here it suggests that in the same way the Holy Spirit gives life to the bread and wine, it gave life to the Virgin's womb. She carries the Body and Blood of Christ, and is attended by three priestly angels. Mary's function is to bear "the Savior of the World"; the angels' role is to "support, present and protect her sacred being". With the birth of Christ her "miraculous womb passed its final test" to become an object of veneration.

=== Bride of Christ ===
Memling presents the Virgin as the Bride of Christ about to assume her role as Queen of Heaven, with attendant angels indicating her royal status. Angels of this kind are usually shown hovering above the Virgin, holding her crown, and some German painters showed them hovering close in Annunciation scenes, but angels rarely approach or touch the Virgin. Only a single previous version of such attendant angels has been found: in the Boucicaut Master's early 15th-century illuminated manuscript version of the "Visitation", the pregnant Virgin's long mantle is held by attendant angels, about which Blum notes that "her queenly appearance surely commemorates the moment when Mary is first addressed as Theotokos, the Mother of the Lord". Memling often depicted pairs of angels dressed in vestments attending the Virgin, but these two, dressed in simple amices and albs, were never repeated in his art. Their dual function is to "present the eucharistic offering and proclaim the Virgin bride and queen".

== Style and influence ==
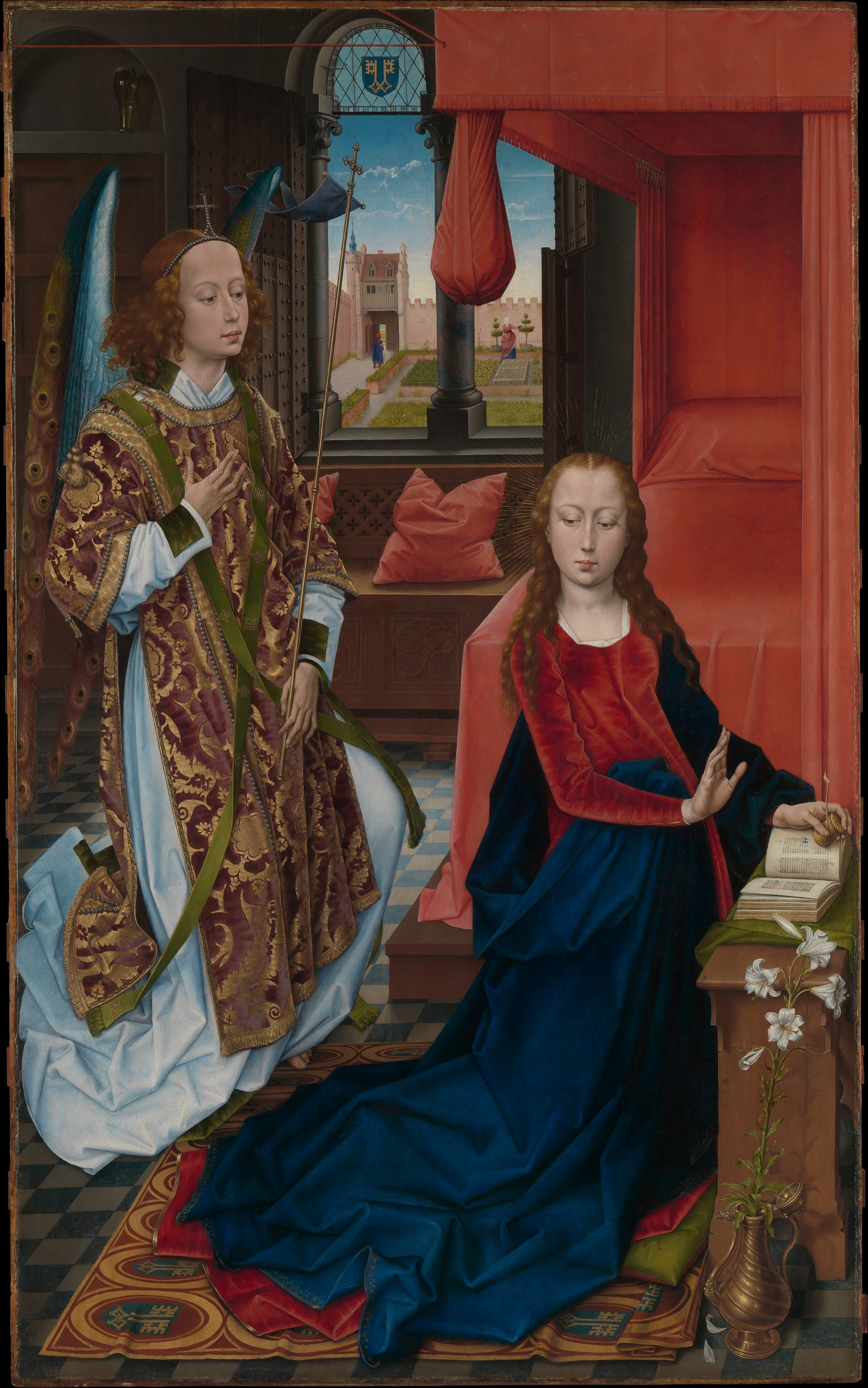
Clugny Annunciation, c. 1465–1475, Workshop of Rogier van der Weyden or by Hans Memling, Metropolitan Museum of Art, New York

The Annunciation draws heavily on van der Weyden's Louvre Annunciation (1430s), his Saint Columba Altarpiece (c. 1455), and the Clugny Annunciation (c. 1465–1475), which is attributed either to van der Weyden or to Memling. Memling almost certainly was apprenticed to van der Weyden in Brussels until he set up his own workshop in Bruges sometime after 1465. Memling's Annunciation is more innovative, with motifs such as the attendant angels that were absent in the earlier paintings. According to Till-Holger Borchert, not only was Memling familiar with van der Weyden's motifs and compositions, but he might have assisted with the underdrawing in van der Weyden's workshop. The shutters on the right are copied from the Louvre panel, and the knotted curtain appears in the Saint Columba triptych's "Annunciation".

A sense of movement is conveyed throughout. The trailing edges of Gabriel's garment fall outside the pictorial space, indicating his arrival. The Virgin's "serpentine" pose, with attendant angels supporting her, adds to the sense of flow. Memling's use of color achieves a startling effect. The traditional rays of light are replaced with light color indicators; the white clothes rendered in "icy" blue, the angel to the right in yellow patches seems "bleached by light", and the left-hand angel appears to be steeped in shadow, dressed in clothes of lavender and bearing deep green wings. The effect is iridescent, according to Blum, who writes, "this shimmering surface gives [the figures] an unearthly quality, separating them from the more believable world of the bedchamber". The effect deviates from the pure naturalism and realism which typifies Early Netherlandish art, causing a "startling" juxtaposition, an effect that is "unsteadying" and contradictory.

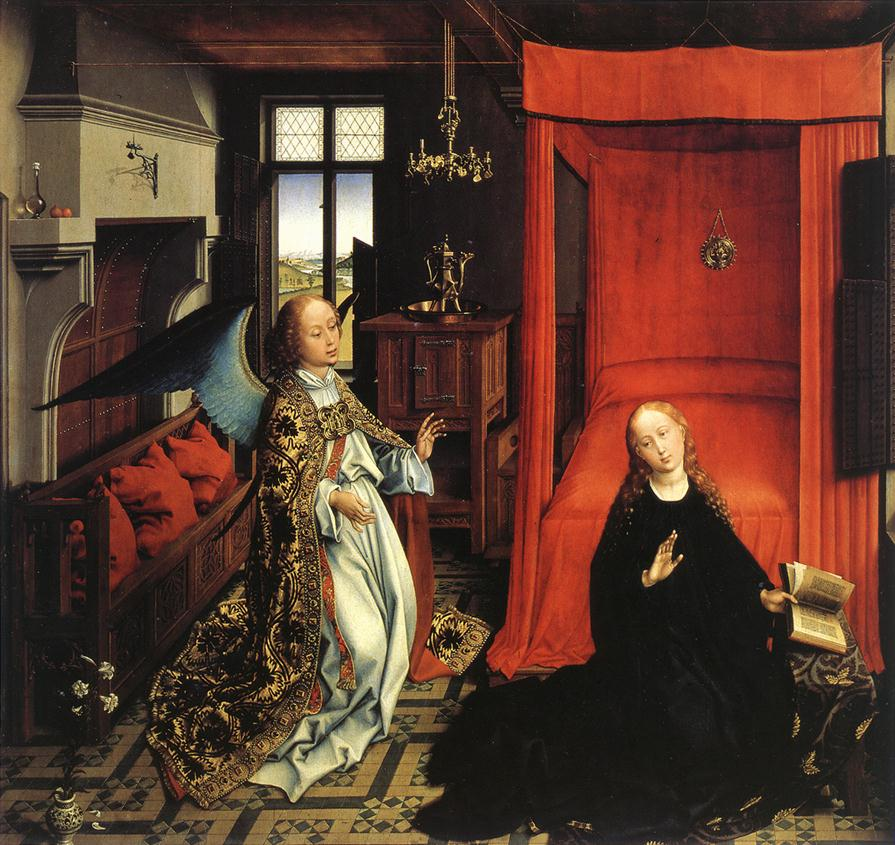
Center panel, Annunciation Triptych, Rogier van der Weyden, c. 1430s, Louvre, Paris

Scholars have not established whether the panel was meant to be a single devotional work, or part of a larger, and now broken up, polyptych. According to Ainsworth, its size and "the sacramental nature of its subject would have been appropriate for a family chapel in a church or monastery for the chapel of a guild corporation". An intact, inscribed frame is unusual for a wing panel, indicating that it was probably intended as a single piece, but scholars are unsure because the slight left-to-right axis of the tiles suggests that it could have been the left-hand wing of a larger piece. There is no information about the panel's reverse, which has not survived.

Technical analysis shows extensive underdrawing, typical for Memling. This was completed in a dry medium, except for the dove and the flask and candles on the sideboard. Revisions during the final painting included the enlargement of the Virgin's sleeves and the repositioning of Gabriel's staff. Incisions were made to indicate the floor tiles and the dove's position.

The only person to question Gustav Friedrich Waagen's 1847 attribution to Memling is W. H. J. Weale, who in 1903 declared that Memling "would never have dreamt of introducing into the representation of this mystery these two sentimental and affected angels".

== Provenance and condition ==
The painting's known provenance begins in the 1830s when it was in the possession of the Radziwiłł family. According to the art historian Sulpiz Boisserée, who saw the painting in 1832, Antoni Radziwiłł found the painting in an estate his father owned. Waagen speculated that may have belonged to Mikołaj Radziwiłł (1549–1616), who might have inherited it from his brother Jerzy Radziwiłł (1556–1600), who was a cardinal. The family kept it until 1920 when Princess Radziwiłł sold it to the Duveen Brothers in Paris. The American investment banker Philip Lehman bought it in October 1920; it is now held in the Robert Lehman collection at the Metropolitan Museum of Art, in New York.

Generally the condition is good. Memling painted the work on two panels of about 28 cm each. The dated and inscribed frame, probably the original, was discarded in 1830. There have been three documented restorations. The painting had been pierced by an arrow when Antoni Radziwiłł found it; he had it restored and the damage repaired. At that time the Virgin's mantle and the flesh tones sustained heavy overpainting. The original frame was discarded, but its inscription was inserted into the new frame. A description of the original frame suggests that it bore a coat of arms, perhaps belonging to Jerzy Radziwiłł. The second restoration was after its exhibition in Bruges in 1902, and the third when Lehman had it restored and transferred to canvas sometime after 1928. The painting survived the transfer without significant damage. A late 19th-century photograph shows wood on all four sides of the painted surface, which suggests that the edges may have been extended during the transfer. Areas that suffered paint loss and overpainting are Gabriel's cope and the vase holding the flowers.

When Boisserée saw the painting he recorded the inscription's date as 1480. The last digit of the inscription was faded and difficult to read and had become illegible by 1899. Waagen suggested that the date could have been 1482, and the art historian Dirk de Vos suggested 1489. Memling's style does not lend itself well to assigning dates, making a determination difficult. According to Sterling, an earlier date is easily accepted, especially because of stylistic similarities to Memling's 1479 St John Altarpiece, whereas Ainsworth leans toward the later date as more in keeping with the mature style of the late 1480s.

== Sources ==
- Ainsworth, Maryan. "Hans Memling: The Annunciation". In: From Van Eyck to Bruegel: Early Netherlandish Painting in the Metropolitan Museum of Art. New York: Metropolitan Museum of Art, 1998. ISBN 978-0-87099-870-6
- Blum, Shirley Neilsen. "Hans Memling's 'Annunciation' with Angelic Attendants". Metropolitan Museum of Art Journal. Vol. 27, 1992. 43–58
- Borchert, Till-Holger. "Hans Memling and Rogier van der Weyden". In: J. Chapuis (ed), Invention: Northern Renaissance Studies in Honor of Molly Faries. Turnhout, Belgium: Brepols, 2008. ISBN 978-2-503-52768-0
- De Montebello, Phillippe. (ed). The Metropolitan Museum of Art Guide. New York: Metropolitan Museum of Art, 1994. ISBN 978-0-87099-710-5
- Jolly, Penny Howell. Picturing the 'Pregnant' Magdalene in Northern Art, 1430–1550: Addressing and Undressing the Sinner-Saint. Farnham, Surrey: Ashgate, 2014. ISBN 978-1-4724-1495-3
- Koslow, Susan. "The Curtain-Sack: A Newly Discovered Incarnation Motif in Rogier van der Weyden's 'Columba Annunciation'". Artibus et Historiae. Vol. 7, No. 13, 1986. 9–33
- Meiss, Millard. "Light as Form and Symbol in Some Fifteenth-Century Paintings". The Art Bulletin, Vol. 27, No. 3, 1945. 175–181
- Snyder, James (ed). The Renaissance in the North. New York: Metropolitan Museum of Art, 1987. ISBN 978-0-87099-434-0
- Sterling, Charles. Fifteenth- to Eighteenth-century European Paintings in the Robert Lehman Collection. New York: Metropolitan Museum of Art with Princeton University Press, 1998. ISBN 978-0-691-00698-7
- W. H. James Weale. “The Early Painters of the Netherlands as Illustrated by the Bruges Exhibition of 1902. Article I.” The Burlington Magazine for Connoisseurs, vol. 1, no. 1, 1903, pp. 41–53.
