= Annunciation (Correggio) =

Fresco by Antonio da Correggio

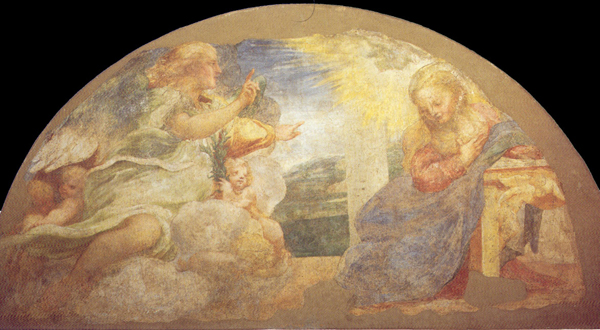
- Artist: Correggio
- Year: c. 1525
- Medium: fresco
- Dimensions: 157 cm × 315 cm (62 in × 124 in)
- Location: Galleria nazionale, Parma

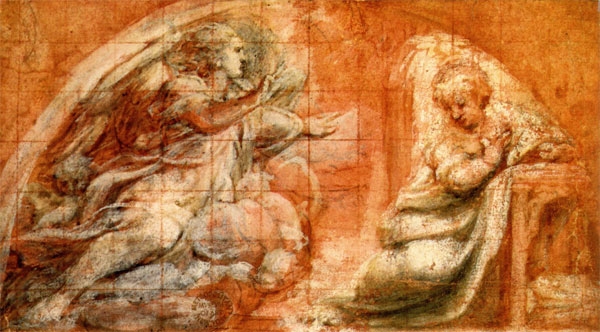
Preparatory drawing in the Metropolitan Museum

The Annunciation is a 157 by 315 cm fresco fragment by Correggio, dating to around 1524-1525 and now in the Galleria nazionale di Parma.

== History ==
It was originally painted on the wall of the church of San Francesco in Parma. Its style allows it to be dated to the 1520s, shortly after Correggio finished the frescoes on the dome of the church of San Giovanni Evangelista and just before he began those on the dome of Parma Cathedral. The figure of Gabriel on a cloud with his robe blown in the wind is reminiscent of Correggio's work on these other two frescoes

On San Francesco's demolition in 1546 was moved to another location, where it was seen by Vasari:

Also in the same city (Parma), in the church of the Frati de' Zocoli di S. Francesco, can be seen an Annunciation in fresco, which is so fine that when they demolished its original home, the monks placed iron bars behind that section of wall, cut it away little by little and moved the section of wall to another safer position in the same convent.

It was later moved a second time, to the Annunziata church in Capo di Ponto.

== Bibliography ==
- (in Italian) Lucia Fornari Schianchi (ed.), Correggio, Skira, Milano, 2008. ISBN 9788857200057 (exhibition catalogue for the 2008-2009 exhibition in Parma; with bibliography)
- David Ekserdjan, Correggio, Amilcare Pizzi, Milano, 1997.
