= St. Michael's Chapel, Wawel Castle =

Ruined church complex

Coordinates: 50°03′14″N 19°56′07″E

Map with the location of St Michael's Chapel (in red) on Wawel Hill

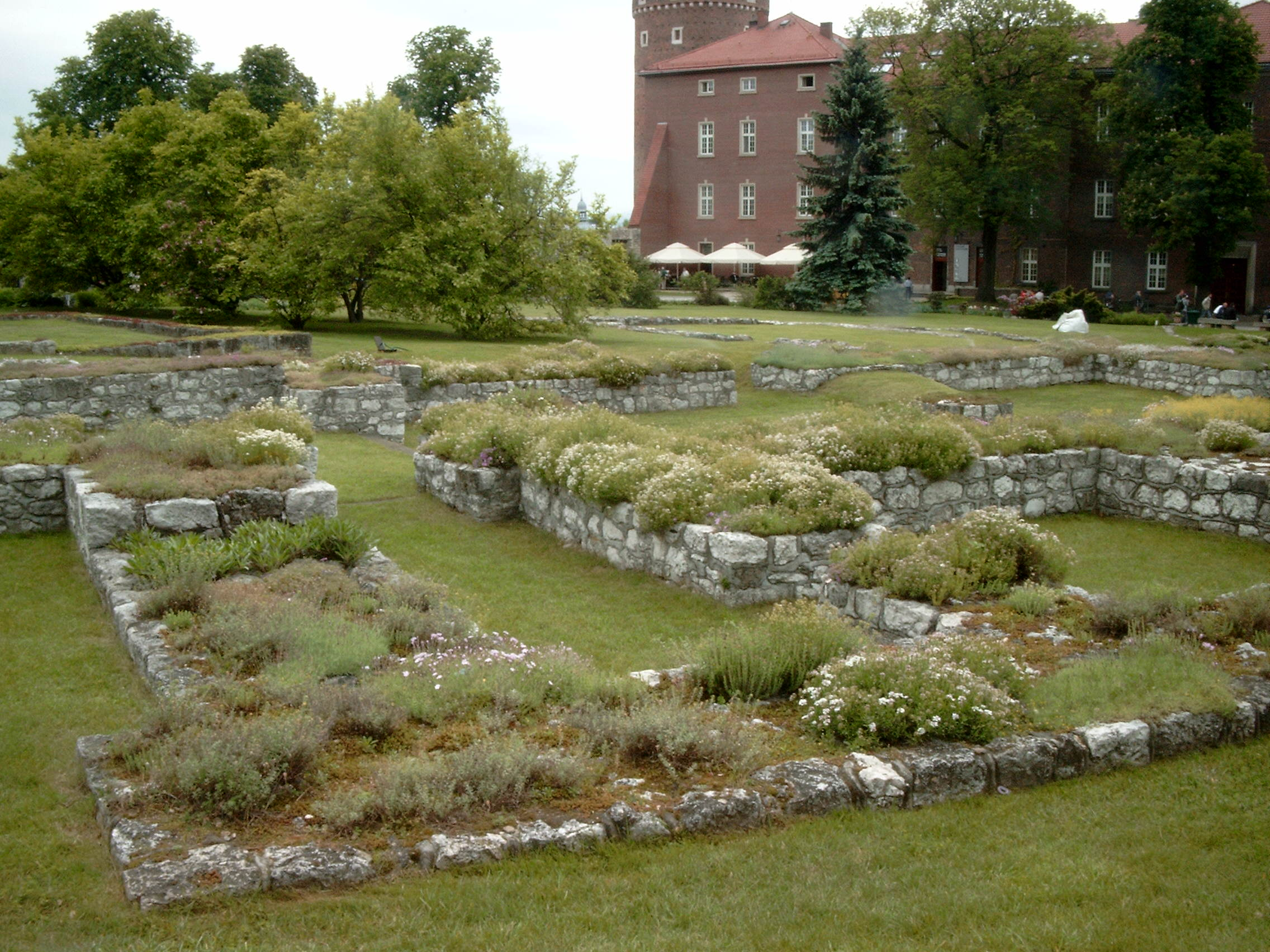
Remains of the chapel (2006)

St Michael's Chapel (Polish: Kaplica św. Michała) was a place of worship at Wawel Castle in Kraków, Poland. It was both a royal chapel and the chapel of the commoners. The chapel was governed by the dean and canons of Wawel.

The chapel was located in the outer courtyard of the castle hill. The first mention of the chapel dates from 1148. A hundred years later, the chronicler Jan Długosz mentions on the hill a brick chapel on the site of an earlier wooden one during the reign of King Casimir III the Great. The chapel consisted of a nave with a pentagonal chancel to the east and vestry to the north. In the 17th century it was restored due to the efforts of Bishop Jakub Zadzik.

It was demolished during the Austrian rule in 1803–1804, when the occupying garrison created a large space to hold their drills. The remains of the chapel were excavated after World War II. There are intentions to reconstruct the chapel.

== See also ==
- St George's Chapel, Wawel Castle
- Stanisław Borek House
