= Annunciation (Lippi, Munich) =

Painting by Filippo Lippi

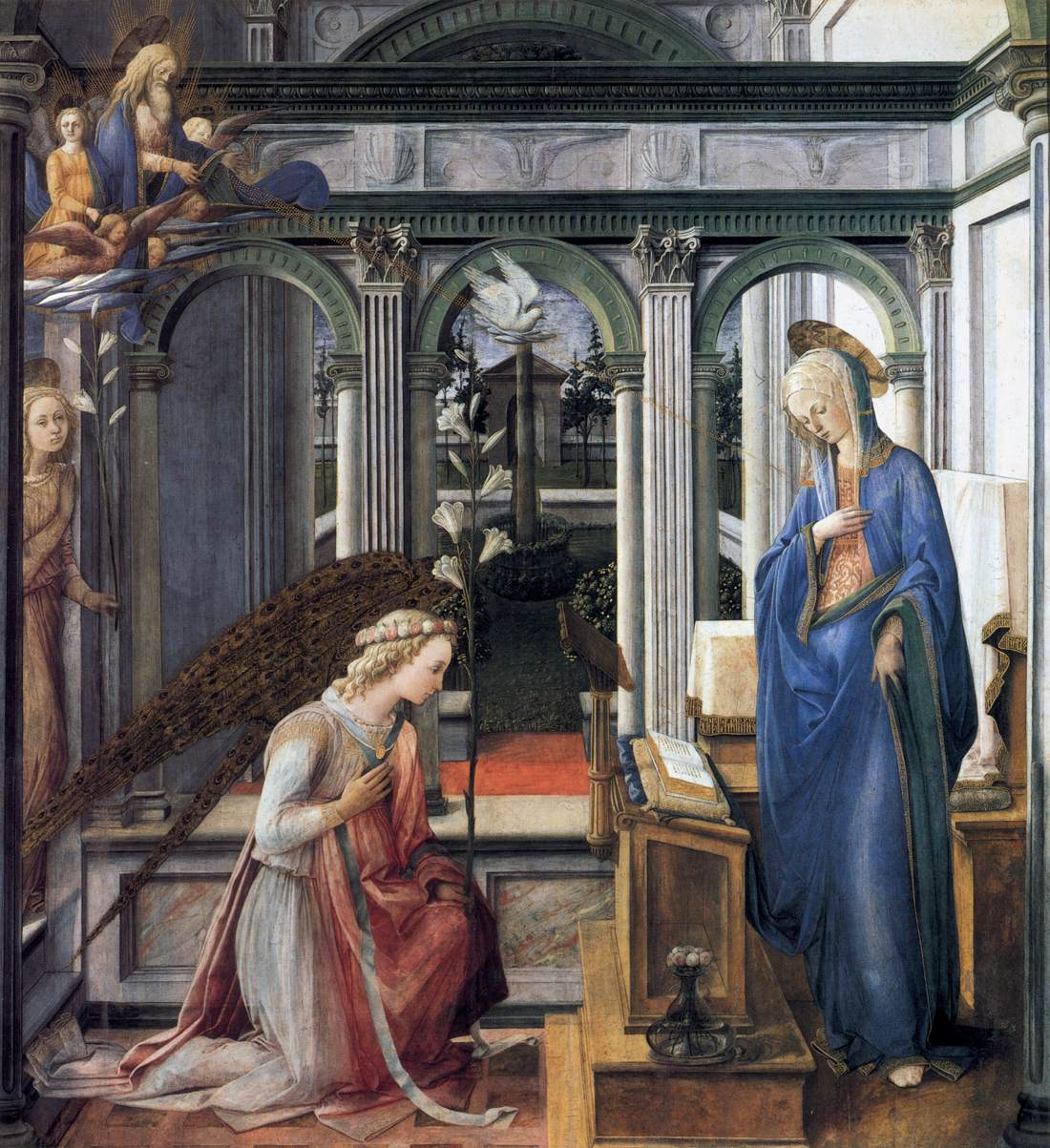
- Artist: Filippo Lippi
- Year: c. 1443–1450
- Medium: Oil on panel
- Dimensions: 203 cm × 186 cm (80 in × 73 in)
- Location: Alte Pinakothek, Munich

The Annunciation, also known as Murate Annunciation, is a painting by the Italian Renaissance painter Filippo Lippi, finished around 1443–1450, originally for the Monastero delle Murate, in Florence. It is housed in the Alte Pinakothek, Munich, Germany.

It depicts the Annunciation—the announcement made by the archangel Gabriel to Mary that she would conceive and bear Jesus Christ. Gabriel is depicted as particularly youthful, with a tall slender Mary—standing behind a small lectern—almost appearing as a "porcelain statue at an altar or shrine", according to Susan von Rohr Scaff. Lippi also includes additional figures of witnessing angels.

== See also ==
- Lippi's Annunciation (Galleria Nazionale d'Arte Antica)
- Lippi's Annunciation (Galleria Doria Pamphilj)
