= Annunciation (Lippi, Rome) =

Painting by Filippo Lippi

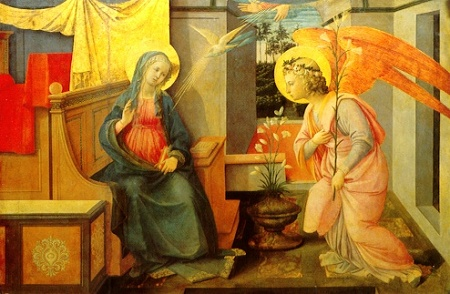
- Artist: Filippo Lippi
- Year: c. 1445–1450
- Medium: Tempera on wood
- Dimensions: 117 cm × 173 cm (46 in × 68 in)
- Location: Galleria Doria Pamphilj, Rome
- Accession: FC 668

The Annunciation is a tempera on wood painting by the Florentine Renaissance painter Filippo Lippi, executed by the artist between 1445 and 1450. It entered the collection of the Galleria Doria Pamphilj, Rome in the mid-19th century.

Differences with other depictions of the Annunciation include the angel's position on the right and the use of a very bright source of light, inspired by works of Filippo Brunelleschi and Beato Angelico. On the top are the hands of God, emerging from the clouds and releasing the dove of the Holy Ghost. The dove descends along a luminous trail running toward the Virgin's shoulder, transmitting the Divine Will through materialized light.

The architectural framework may be the work of an assistant.

== See also ==
- Lippi's Annunciation (Galleria Nazionale d'Arte Antica)
- Lippi's Annunciation (Munich)
