= Annunciation (Rubens) =

Two paintings by Peter Paul Rubens

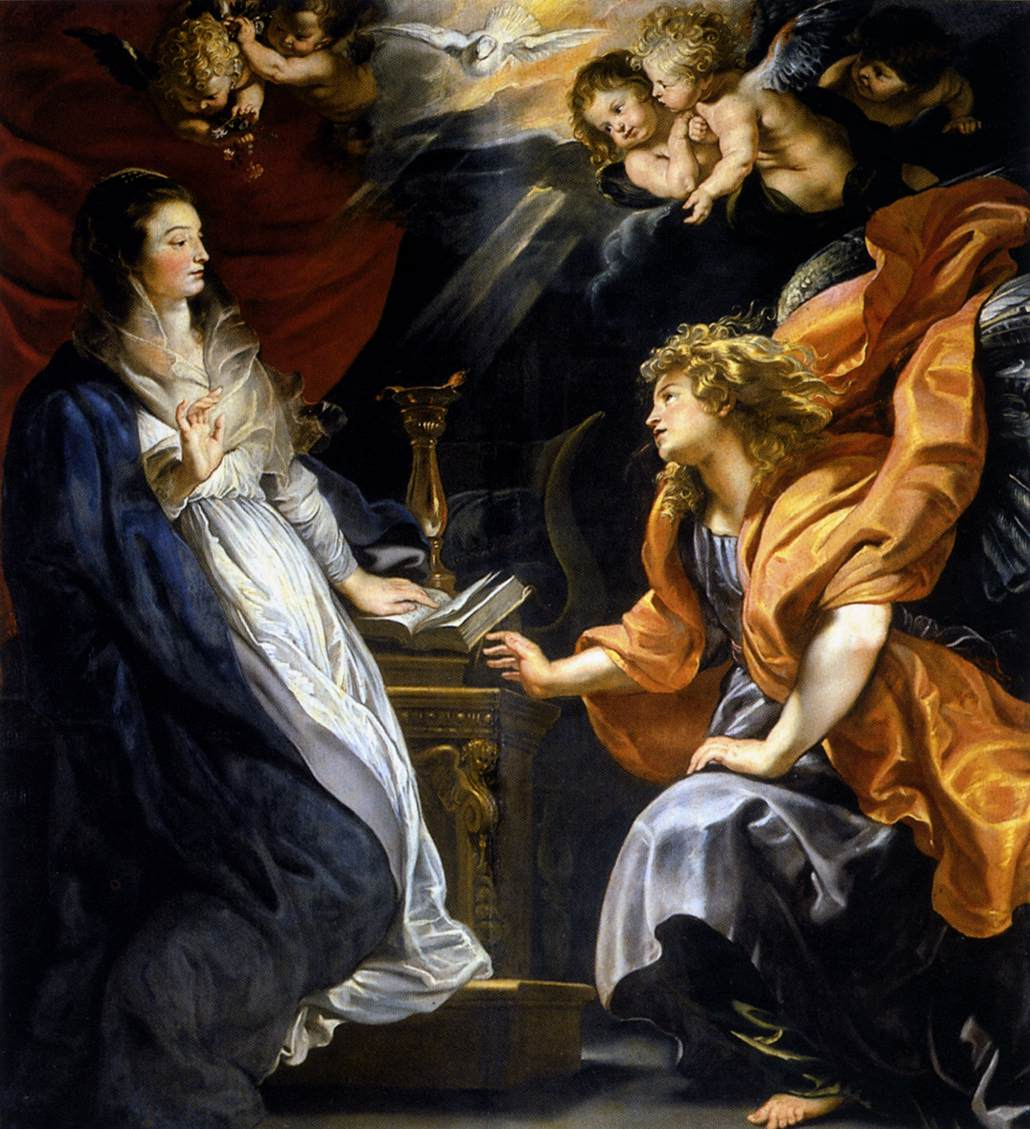
The Annunciation (1609) by Rubens

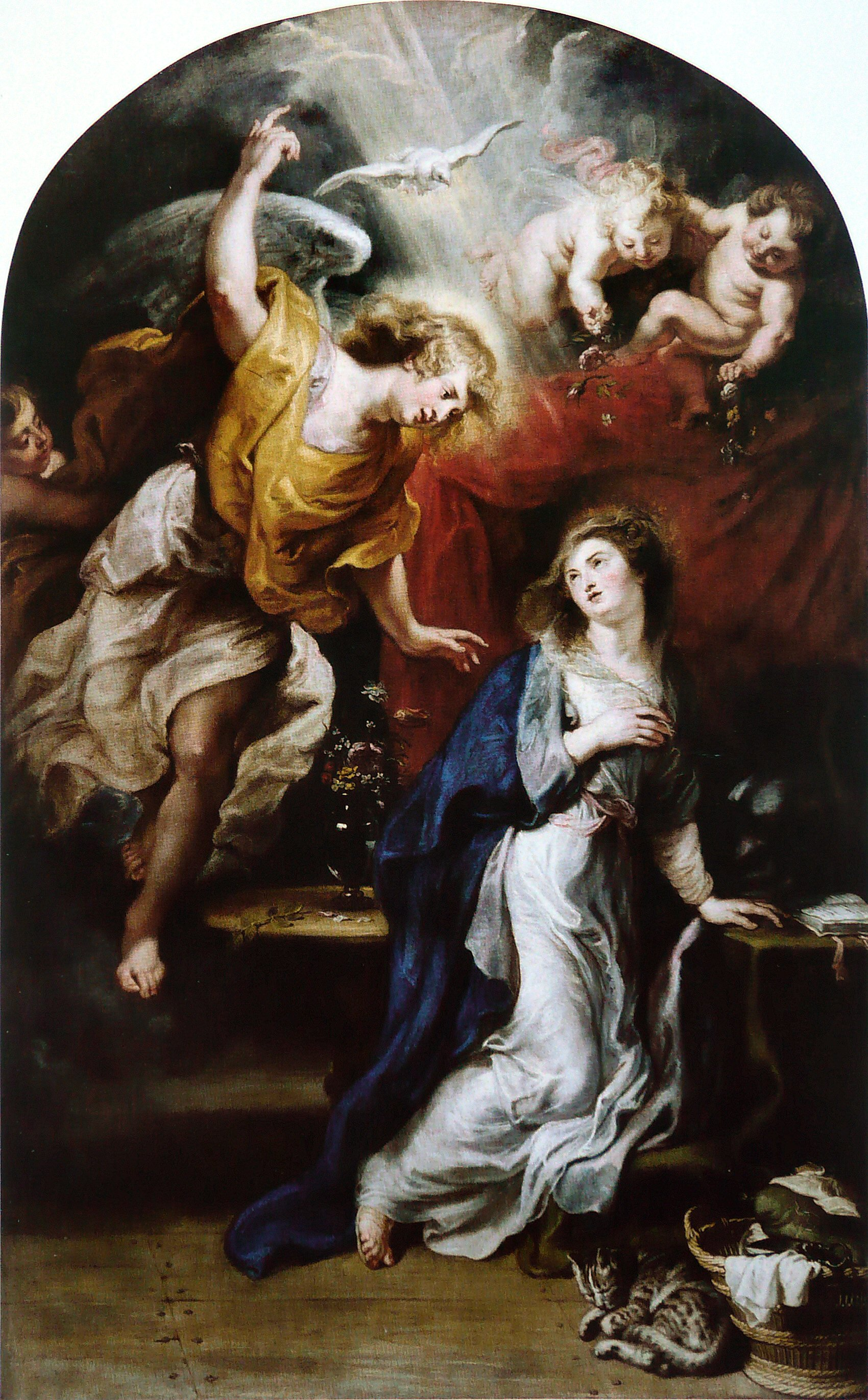
The Annunciation (1610–1628) by Rubens

The Annunciation is the title of two paintings by Peter Paul Rubens. The first was commissioned by the Jesuit college in Antwerp and painted in 1609. It is now in the Kunsthistorisches Museum, Vienna. Around 1610 Rubens composed the second version and painted the righthand half, but then left it incomplete for an unknown reason. In 1627–1628 he completed it and also modified the figure of Mary. It is now in the Rubenshuis in Antwerp, who acquired it in 1954.

The two compositions are strikingly different. The Vienna painting is a fairly traditional composition. The angel Gabriel is on the right. He has just alighted on the ground, his robe still billowing from his flight, and he kneels as if in reverence or supplication. Mary stands on the left facing Gabriel, but she leans back slightly as if in surprise or alarm. The Antwerp painting is a more original composition. Mary kneels on the right; her body is turned away from Gabriel but her head is turned back toward him. Gabriel is still airborne; he reaches with his left hand toward Mary and points with his right hand toward heaven.

== History ==
The Rubenshuis painting was in Madrid during Rubens's stay there from 28 August 1628 to 29 April 1629. There it was acquired by Diego Messia, marquis de Leganés, commander of the Spanish artillery and cavalry in the Spanish Netherlands. In 1655, the painting was in the inventory of the marquis' collection then it was left to the Altamira family, who sold it in London in 1827. It then passed through the Smith, Hamlet, earl of Caldon and Graupe collections in Britain before being acquired by the Brussels collector Gaston Dulière.
