= Annunciation with Two Kneeling Donors =

Painting by Filippo Lippi

Annunciation
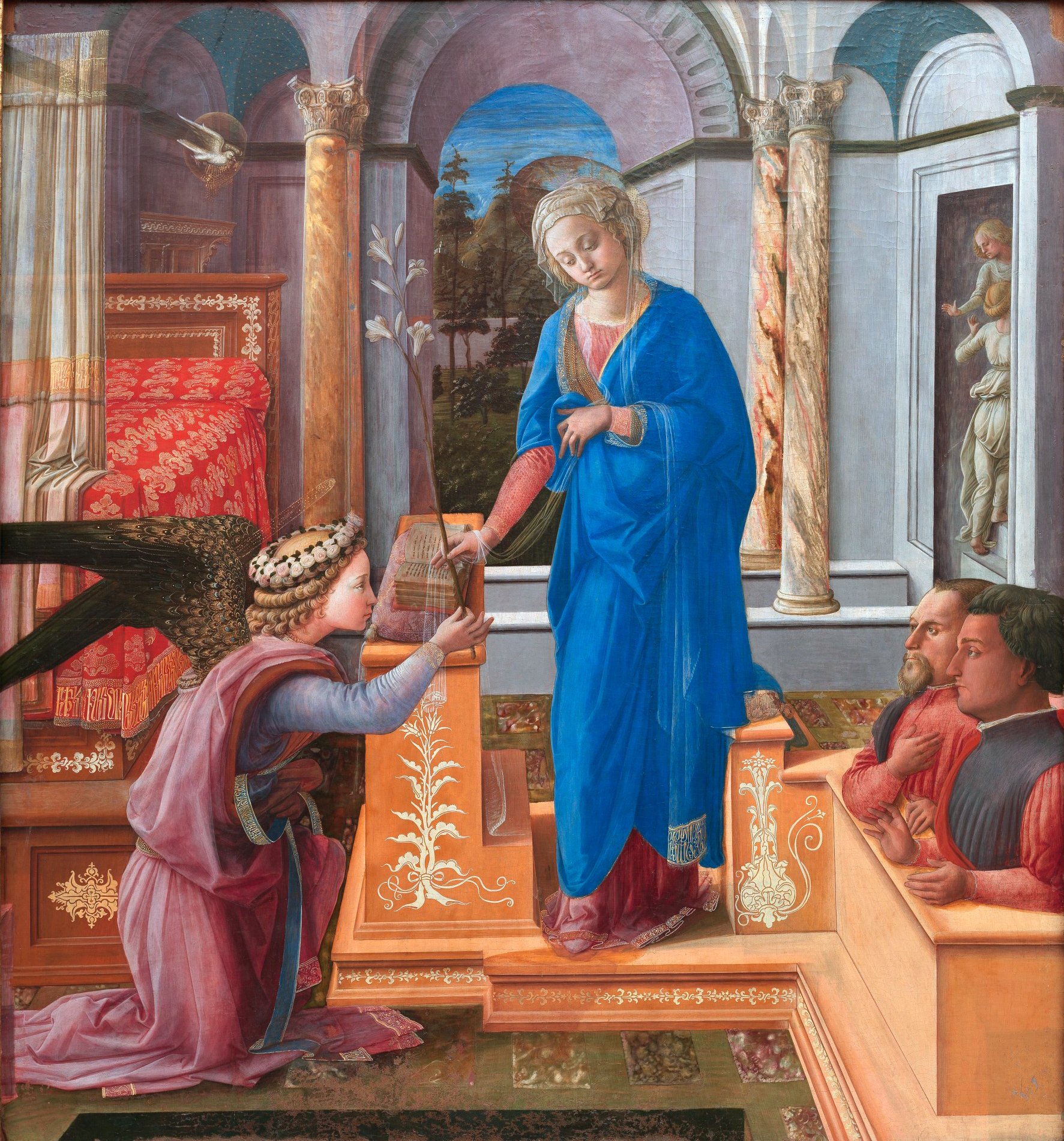
- Artist: Filippo Lippi
- Year: 1440–1445
- Medium: Tempera on panel
- Dimensions: 153 cm × 144 cm (60 in × 57 in)
- Location: Galleria Nazionale d'Arte Antica, Rome

The Annunciation is an Italian Renaissance painting by Filippo Lippi. Dating to 1440–1445, it is housed in the Galleria Nazionale d'Arte Antica of Palazzo Barberini, Rome.

== Description ==
The composition pivots around the Virgin, who occupies the centre of the scene in blue robes. In the background, on the right, two small figures of women are running up the stairs. The two donor portraits show the unidentified donors kneeling behind a cordonata.

That the donors were represented pictorially in natural size was a relatively new stylistic feature. Traditional paintings of the Annunciation depict only a limited number of actors: the Virgin, the Archangel, and the Holy Spirit.

== See also ==
- Lippi's Annunciation (Galleria Doria Pamphilj, Rome)
- Lippi's Annunciation (Munich)
