= Annunciation (Previtali) =

Painting by Andrea Previtali

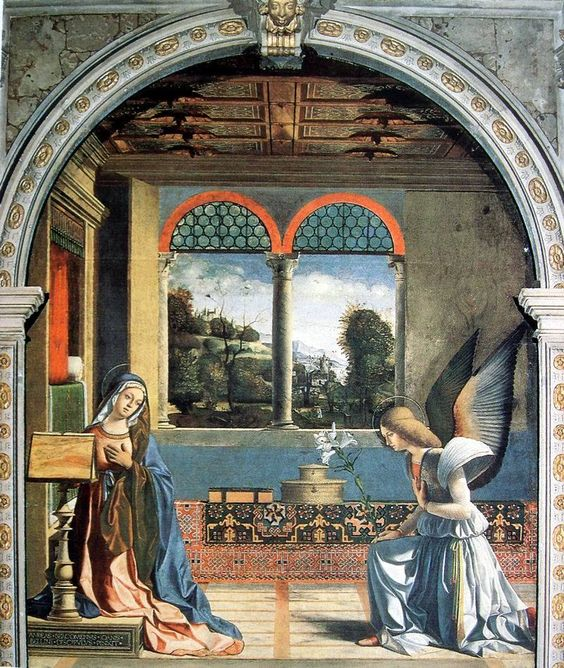
Annunciation (1505-1510) by Andrea Previtali

Annunciation is a 1505–1510 oil on canvas painting by Andrea Previtali, produced for the high altar of the church of Santa Maria Annunziata in Meschio, now a district of Vittorio Veneto, where it is still on show. It was produced before the Bergamo-born artist returned to his birthplace. It is signed ANDREA BERGOMENSIS IOANIS BELLINI DISCIPLINUS PINXIT and shows marked influence from Previtali's teacher Giovanni Bellini.

== Bibliography ==
- (in Italian) Antonia Abbatista Finocchiaro, 'La pittura bergamasca nella prima decina del cinquecento', in La Rivista di Bergamo, 2001.
- Mauro Zanchi (2009). Andrea Previtali il colore prospettico di maniera belliniana (in Italian). Ferrari Editrice.
