= Annunciation (Bellini) =

Paintings by Giovanni Bellini

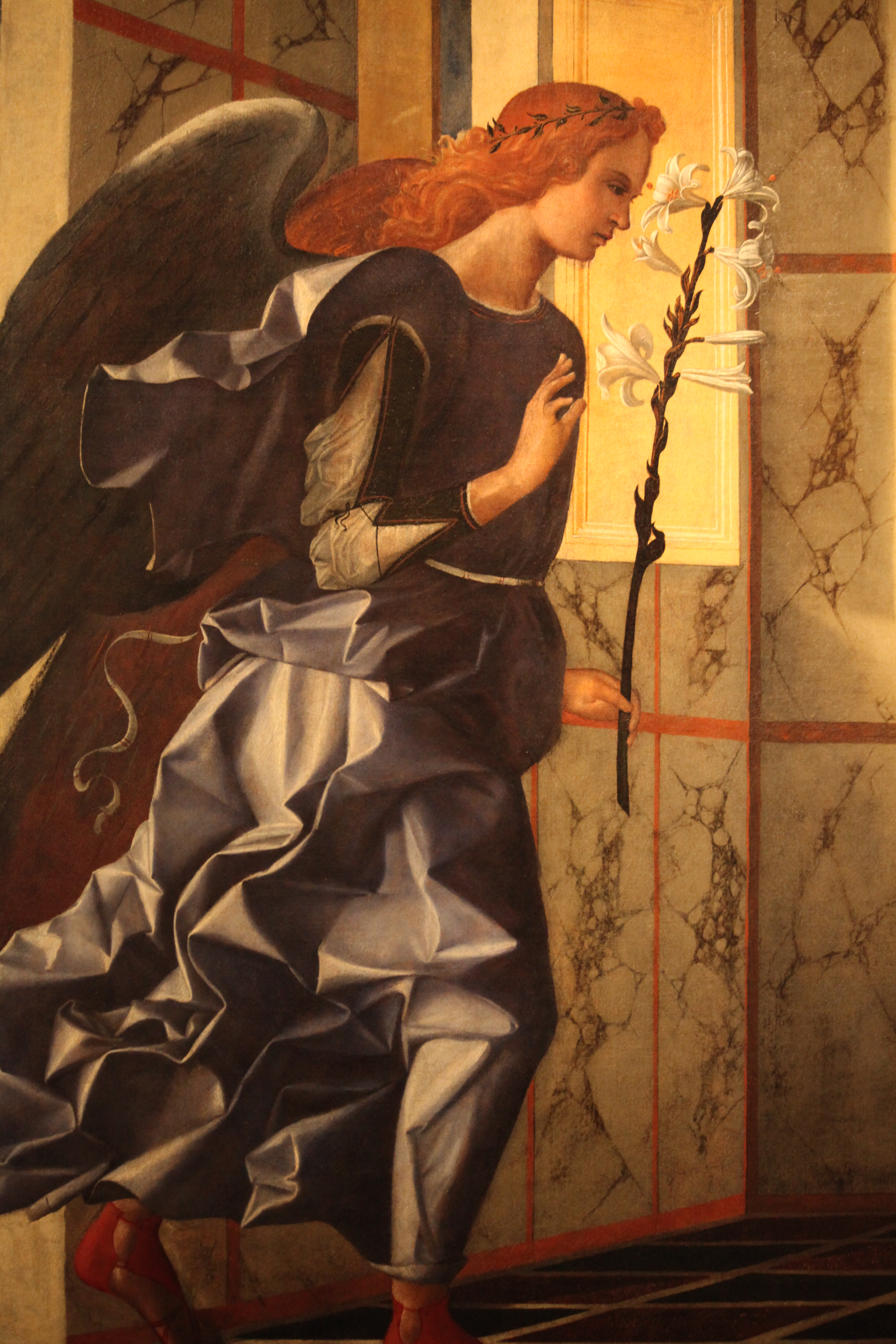
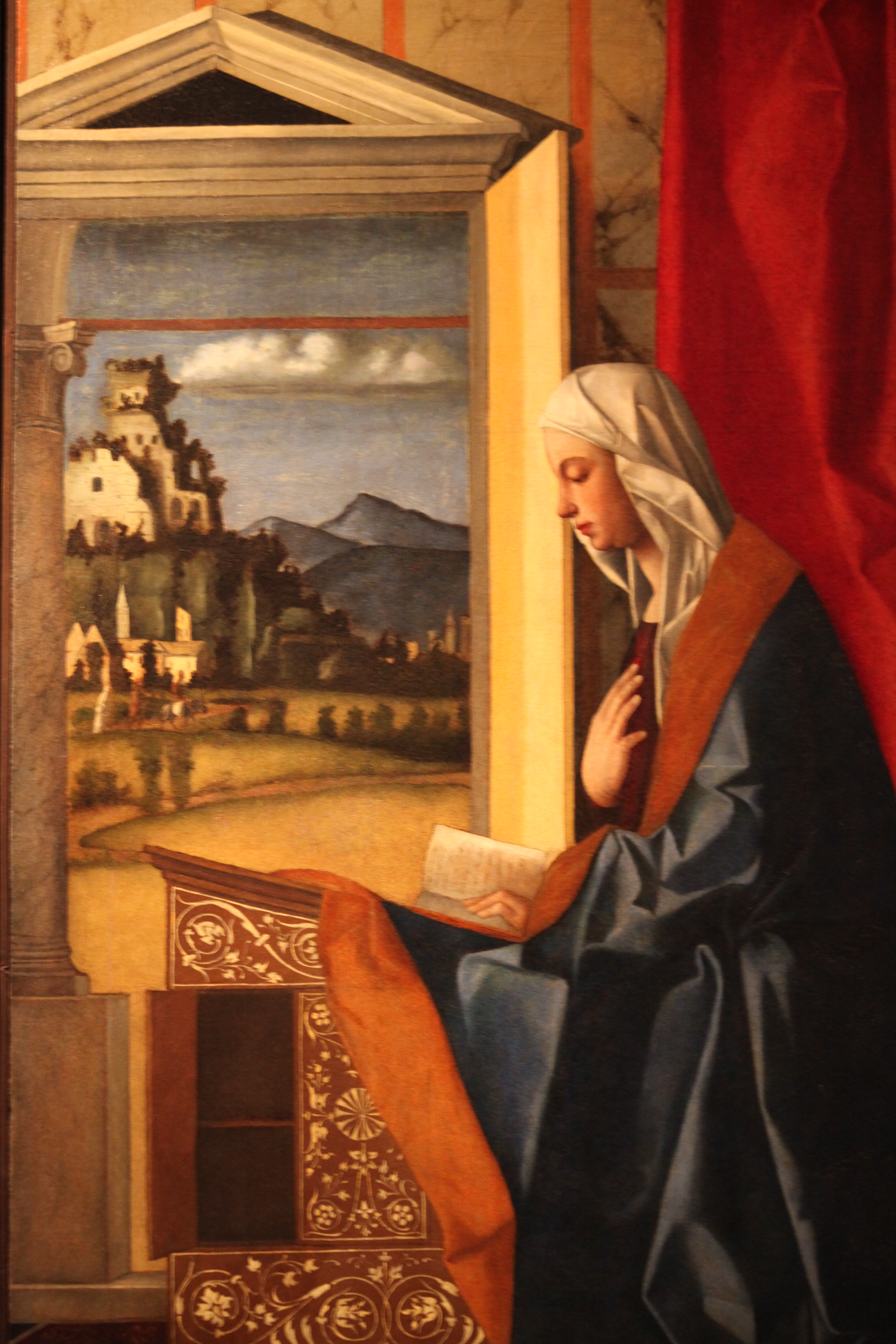
Gabriel and Mary.

The Annunciation is a c. 1500 oil-on-canvas diptych by the Italian Renaissance master Giovanni Bellini and his studio assistants. Each of the two canvases measures 224 by 105 cm and they are both now in the Gallerie dell'Accademia in Venice. They were produced as external door covers for an organ at Santa Maria dei Miracoli, Venice – on their reverses were St Peter (also in the Gallerie dell'Accademia) and St Paul (lost).

== See also ==
- List of works by Giovanni Bellini
