= Annunciation (El Greco, Sigüenza) =

1614 painting by El Greco

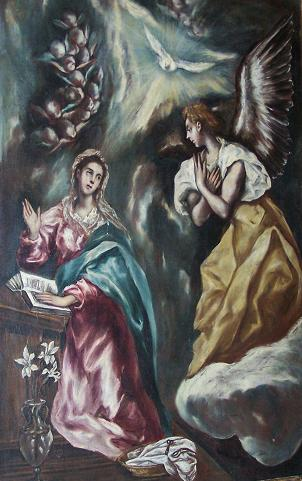
- Artist: El Greco
- Year: 1614
- Medium: oil on canvas
- Dimensions: 152 cm × 99 cm (60 in × 39 in)
- Location: Diocesan Museum, Sigüenza

Annunciation is a 1614 painting by El Greco, now in the Diocesan Museum in Sigüenza, Spain. One of his last works, he probably produced it in collaboration with his son Jorge Manuel.

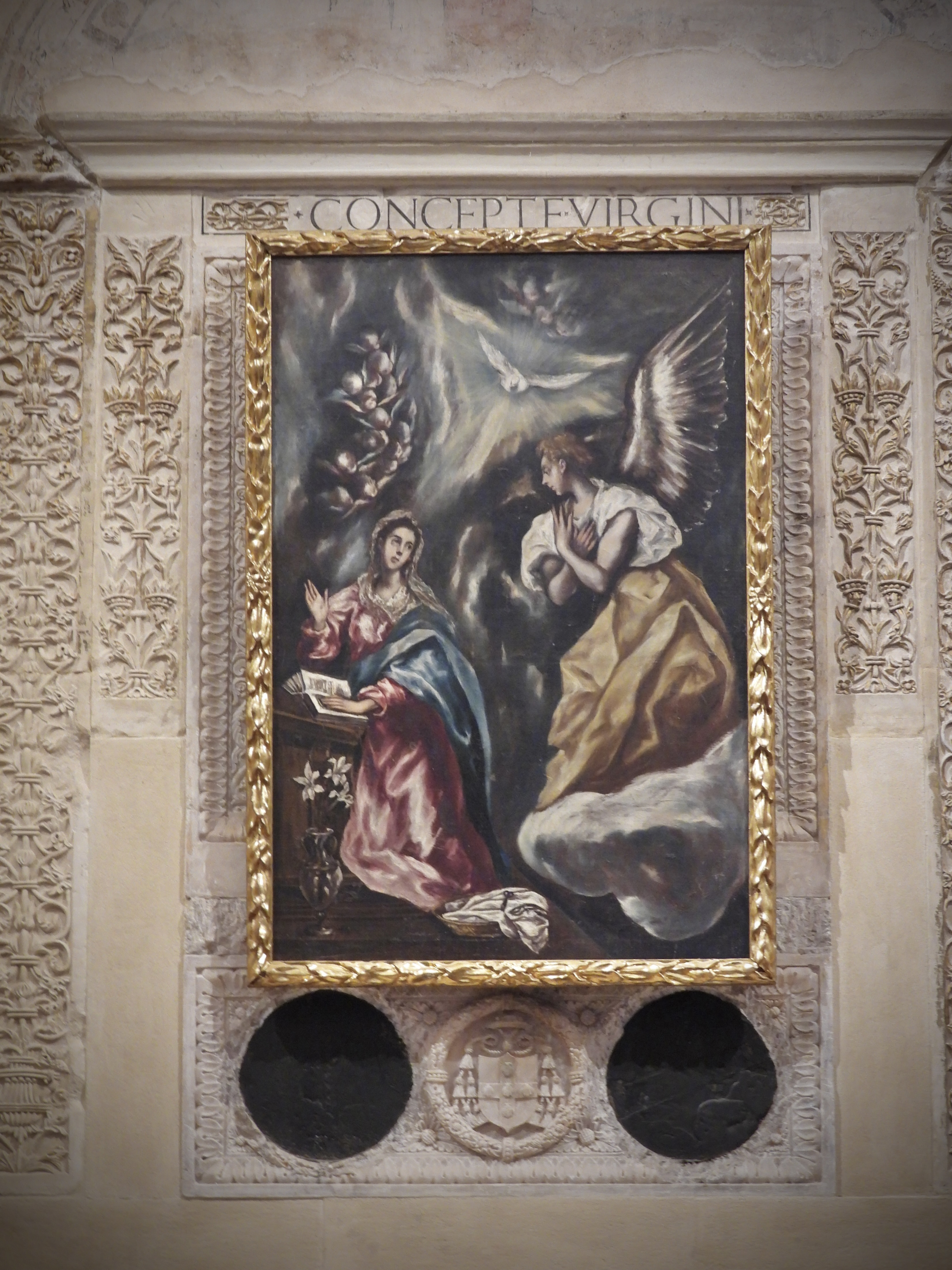
El Greco's oil on canvas painting of The Annunciation dated 1614.

== Bibliography ==
- ÁLVAREZ LOPERA, José, El Greco, Madrid, Arlanza, 2005, Biblioteca «Descubrir el Arte», (colección «Grandes maestros»). ISBN 84-9550-344-1.
- SCHOLZ-HÄNSEL, Michael, El Greco, Colonia, Taschen, 2003. ISBN 978-3-8228-3173-1.
- https://web.archive.org/web/20100918082057/http://www.artehistoria.jcyl.es/genios/cuadros/6416.htm
