= Annunciation (Pittoni) =

Painting by Giambattista Pittoni

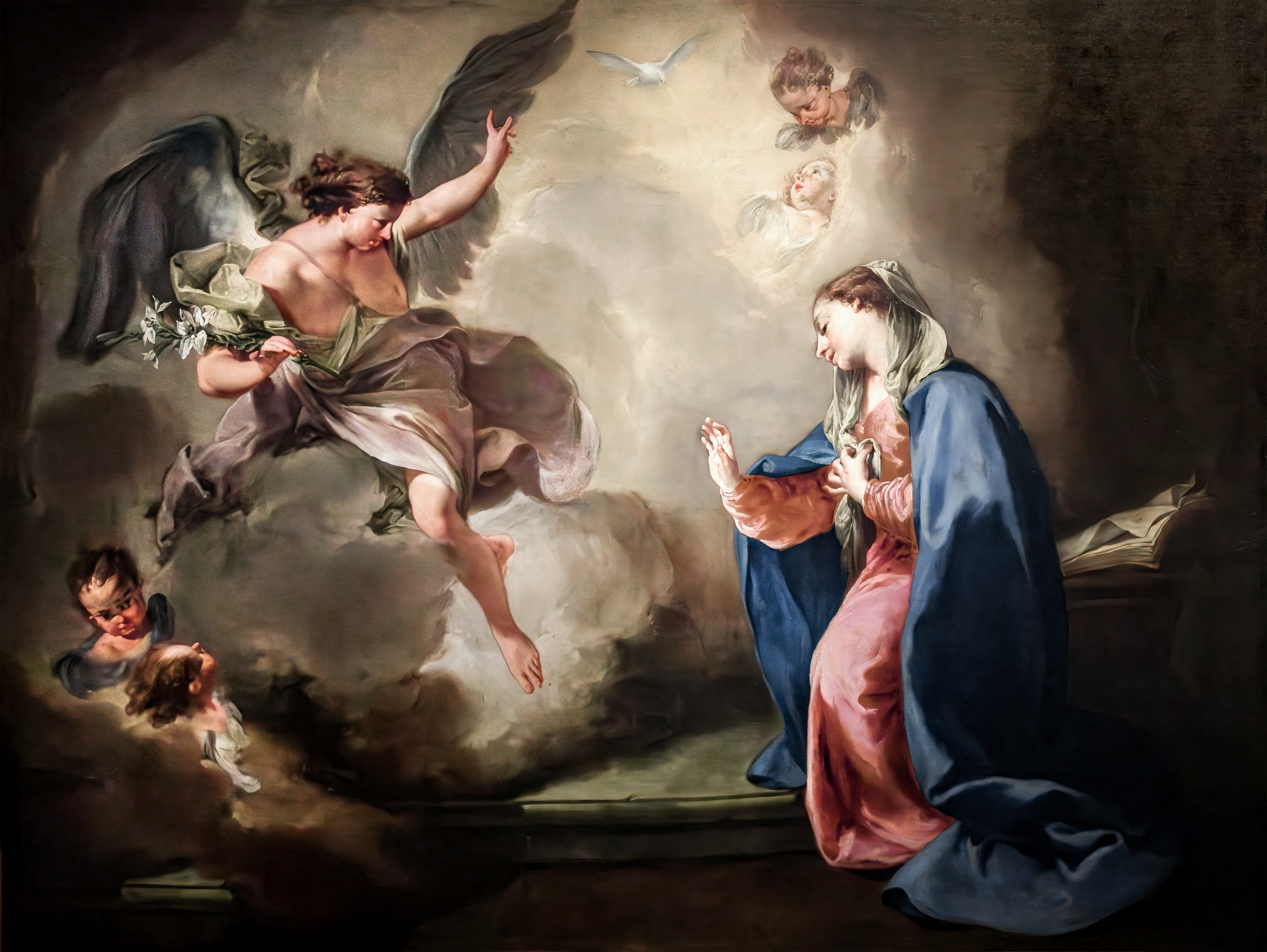
- Artist: Giovanni Battista Pittoni
- Year: c. 1757
- Medium: Oil on canvas
- Dimensions: 153 cm × 205 cm (60 in × 81 in)
- Location: Gallerie dell'Accademia; Venice

Annunciation is an oil on canvas painting by Giovanni Battista Pittoni, from c. 1757. It is held in the Gallerie dell'Accademia, in Venice.

== History and description ==
Pittoni painted this Annunciation at the time of his full artistic maturity. The work depicts a golden cloud from which emerges in an elegant composition the archangel Gabriel, with lilies in his hand, a traditional symbol of the purity of the Virgin Mary. His appearance is accompanied by four cherubim and the dove representing the Holy Spirit, which occupies the brightest point of the scene.

The triangular composition, which makes the angel and the Virgin converge towards the dove of the Holy Spirit, communicates, immediately, the saving intervention of God, who will assumes human nature in the form of the upcoming Messiah. The luminous and dense clouds that surround Gabriel take the furnishings of the room out of sight and enhance the celestial brilliance of his appearance. The cherubim, wrapped in clouds, are an extension of the traditional iconography of the Annunciation, as appear in some works after the Council of Trent. Behind the Virgin, a lectern with an open book is visible, elements introduced in the iconography of the Annunciation in the 15th century, a clear reference to prayer, where the Virgin was absorbed before the heavenly apparition. For some, the book is probably a Psalter, for others, it would be the book of Isaiah, which prophesies the conception of a child by a virgin (Isaiah, 7.14). The archangel Gabriel carries lilies in bloom, a Catholic symbol of purity, and, pointing to the white dove, which dominates the scene, underlines the divine will of the Annunciation, which is being received with sweetness by the Virgin Mary, as a model of faith for the believers.

== Analysis ==
The Virgin faces the angel, while her gesture of the right hand can be interpreted as a sign of trouble (conturbatio), since she would be "surprised by the haughty and magnificent greeting of the Angel", according to Michaël Baxandall, who recalls the five successive states of the Virgin during the Annunciation, as described by the preacher Fra Roberto, reflection (cogitato), trouble (conturbatio), questioning (interrogatio), submission (humiliatio), merit (meritato).

== Cultural references ==
The Sovereign Military Order of Malta issued two postage stamps representing the current painting in 2018.
