= Annunciation School (Buffalo, New York) =

- U.S. National Register of Historic Places
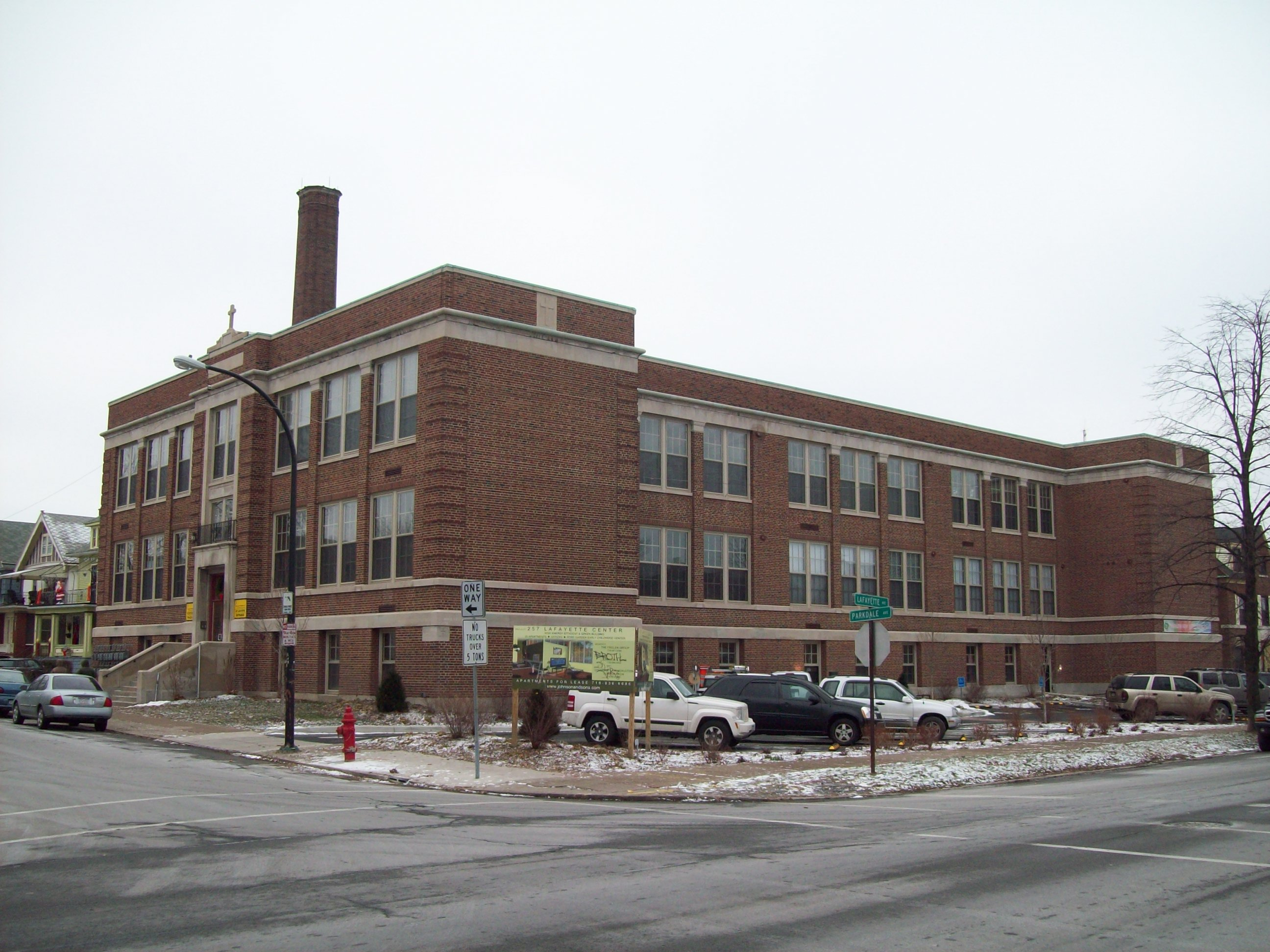
- Annunciation School, Buffalo, NY, December 2009

- Location within New York Location within the United States
- Location: 257 Lafayette Ave., Buffalo, New York
- Coordinates: 42°55′11.46″N 78°53′18.35″W
- Area: 0.6 acres (0.24 ha)
- Built: 1928
- Architect: Murphy, Mortimer J.
- Architectural style: Classical Revival
- NRHP reference No.: 08001139
- Added to NRHP: December 5, 2008

Annunciation School is a historic parochial school building located at Buffalo in Erie County, New York. It was built in 1928 and is an I-shaped brick structure representative of standardized, modestly sized school buildings of the period. It was operated by the Sisters of St. Mary of Namur. The school was closed as a parish school in 1988. It was home to the Catholic Academy of West Buffalo until 2005 and was converted to apartments in 2009–2010.

It was listed on the National Register of Historic Places in 2008.
