= Annunciation Monastery =

Annunciation Monastery may refer to:

- Annunciation Monastery (Tolyatti), a Russian church complex
- Annunciation Monastery, Albania
- Annunciation Monastery, Čačak, a Serbian Monument of Culture of Great Importance
- Annunciation Monastery (University of Mary), a Benedictine religious community in Bismarck, North Dakota
