= Annunciation (El Greco, São Paulo Museum of Art) =

1600 painting by El Greco

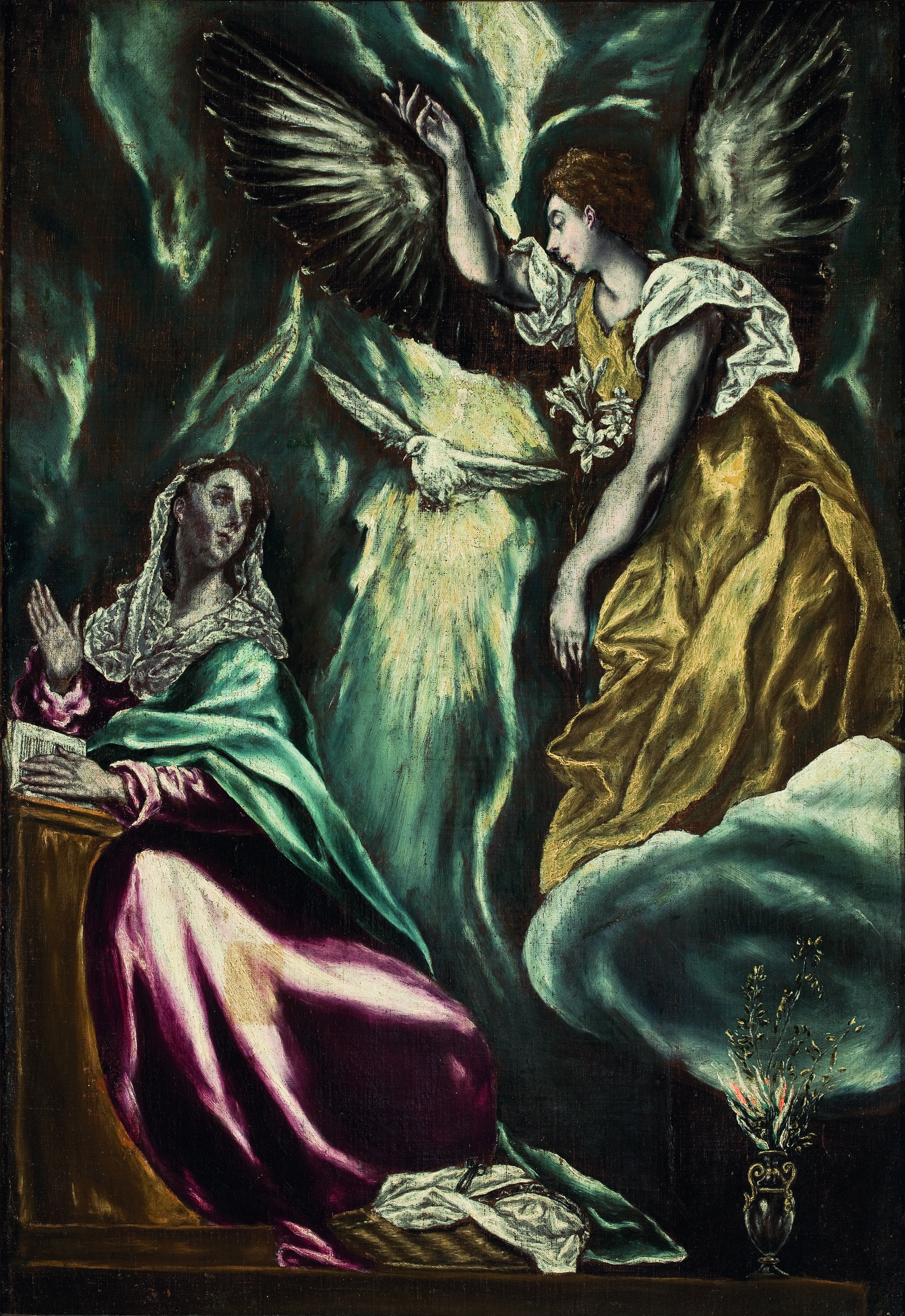
- Artist: El Greco
- Year: 1600
- Medium: oil on canvas
- Dimensions: 107 cm × 74 cm (42 in × 29 in)
- Location: São Paulo Museum of Art

Annunciation is a 1600 painting by El Greco, now in the São Paulo Museum of Art in Brazil.

== Bibliography ==
- (in Spanish) ÁLVAREZ LOPERA, José, El Greco, Madrid, Arlanza, 2005, Biblioteca «Descubrir el Arte», (colección «Grandes maestros»). ISBN 84-9550-344-1.
- (in Spanish) SCHOLZ-HÄNSEL, Michael, El Greco, Colonia, Taschen, 2003. ISBN 978-3-8228-3173-1.
