= Annunciation (Antonello da Messina) =

Painting by Antonello da Messina

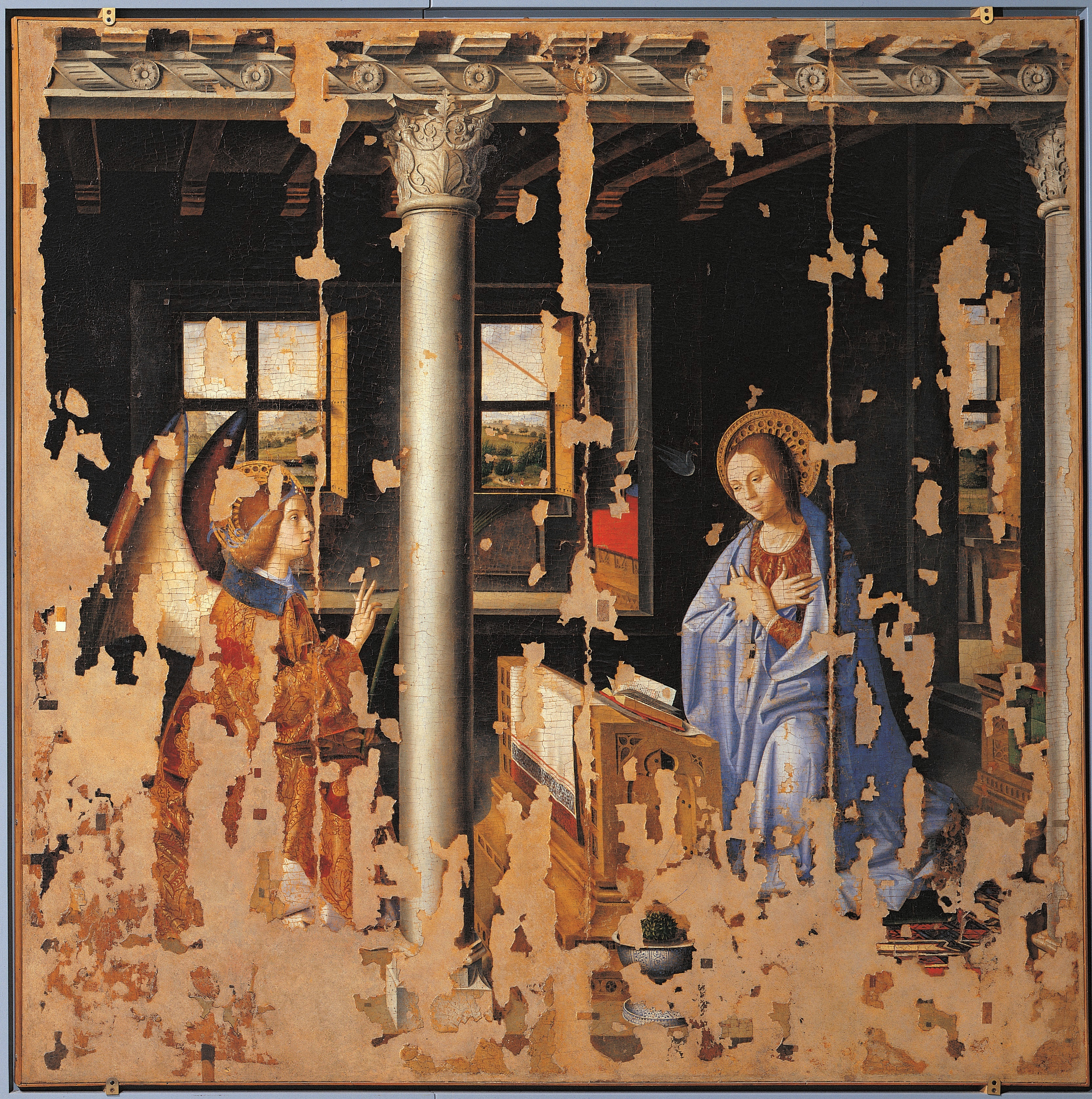
- Artist: Antonello da Messina
- Year: 1474
- Medium: Oil on panel
- Dimensions: 180 cm × 180 cm (71 in × 71 in)
- Location: Bellomo Palace Regional Gallery; Syracuse

The Annunciation is an oil-on-panel painting by the Italian Renaissance master Antonello da Messina, executed in 1474. It is housed in the Bellomo Palace Regional Gallery, in the historical center of Syracuse, Sicily.

== History ==
The contract for the realization of the work was signed in August 1474 by Antonello and Giuliano Maniuni, a priest from Palazzolo Acreide, for the local church of Santa Maria Annunziata. The work is subsequently not documented until it was rediscovered in 1897 by Enrico Mauceri, an employee of the Archaeological Museum of Syracuse. In 1902 a document explicitly attributing the work to Antonello was found.

The painting, which was in a poor state of preservation, was restored in 2006.

== Description ==
The scene is set in a small room with a decorated beamed ceiling, supported by two columns which separate the right half of the painting (with the Virgin) from the left one (with the Angel). The background wall has two windows, with a third in another room visible on the right, according to an iconography derived from the Flemish painting, using different light sources and spatial openings also in interiors.

The objects and the furnitures, as usually in Antonello's works, are finely detailed. They include the Virgin's bed in the background room, the prie-dieu on which she is kneeling, the vase with a blue and white decoration in the foreground (now damaged). Mary has crossed hands while being reached by the dove of the Holy Spirit, sent by God through the opened window. She wears a typical blue mantle above a red dress. The angel, who holds the traditional lily (which is however hidden by a column) and blesses the Virgin, has a rich damask decoration. The face, crowned by long blonde hair, is adorned with a blue diadem, pearls and a ruby, typical details of the Flemish school.

Below is also the figure of a devout, the priest mentioned in the commission contract.
