= Bellomo Palace Regional Gallery =

Coordinates: 37°03′28.1″N 15°17′40.5″E

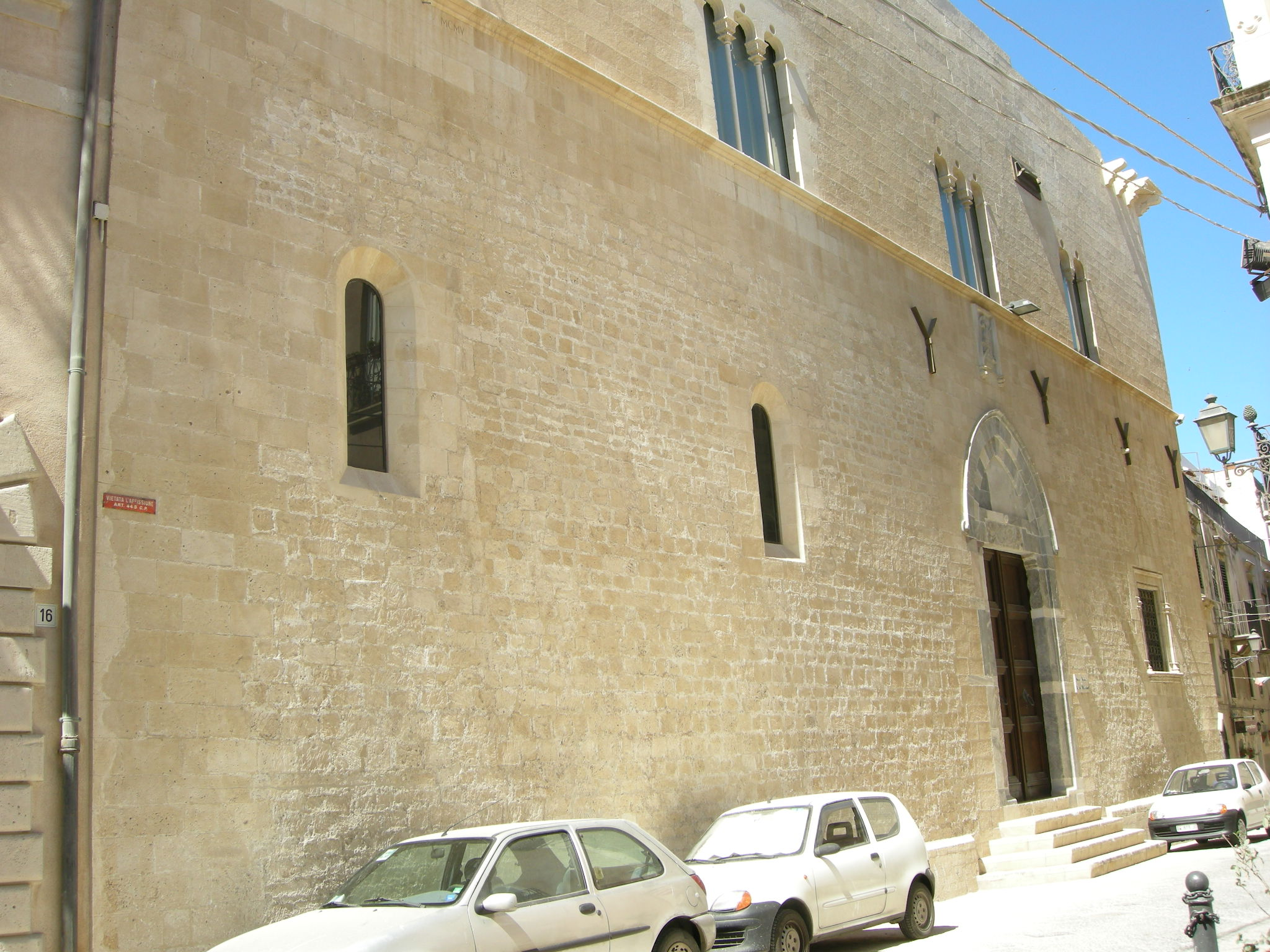
Bellomo Palace

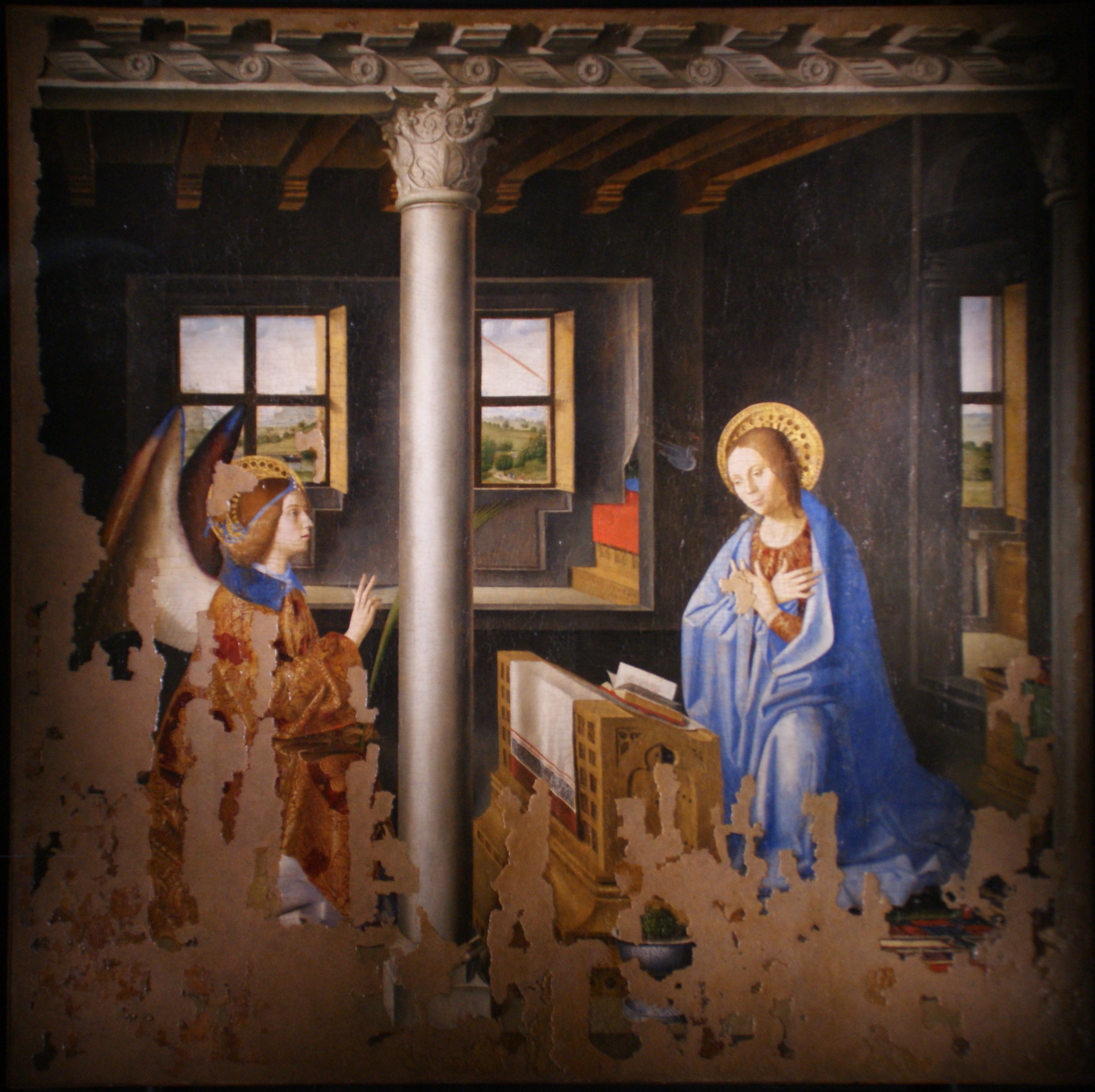
Annunciation by Antonello da Messina

Bellomo Palace Regional Gallery (Italian: Museo di palazzo Bellomo) is an art museum in Syracuse, Sicily.

== Bellomo Palace ==
The museum is situated in the premises of Bellomo Palace. The origins of the palace have been traced to the 12th century, the time of Hohenstaufen rule of Sicily. The palace still features a number of unusually well-preserved elements from this time. The main facade, as well as the basement and ground floor, still essentially retain the 12th-century appearance of the building. Alterations were made in the 14th century and on a larger scale during the 15th century, when it belonged to the Bellomo family from which it derives its name. From this period, a number of details such as portals, mullioned windows and the staircase display influences from Catalan Gothic, a style which was popular on Sicily at the time (as Sicily was at the time part of the Crown of Aragon). In the 18th century the palace and the neighbouring Parisio Palace were taken over by a Benedictine monastery which merged the buildings into one. In 1866 the palace was expropriated by the Italian state and serves as a museum since 1940. A renovation was carried out in 2004-2009.

== Collections ==
The museum houses a collection of religious art (paintings, sculpture and decorative arts) from churches and monasteries in the Syracuse region, dating from AD 400 until today. One noteworthy item is an Annunciation (damaged) by Antonello da Messina.
