= Annunciation Triptych (van der Weyden) =

1434 painting by Rogier van der Weyden

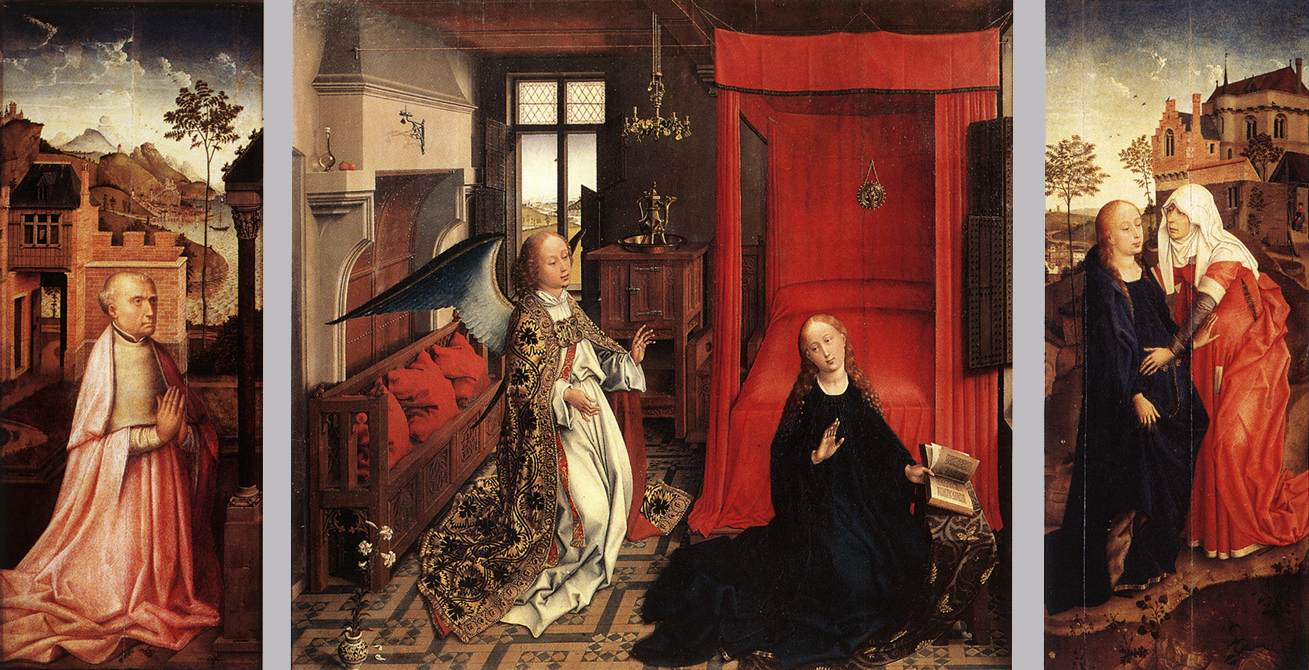
- Artist: Rogier van der Weyden
- Year: c. 1434
- Type: Oil on panel
- Dimensions: 89 cm × 36.5 cm (35 in × 14.4 in)
- Location: the Louvre, Paris, and Galleria Sabauda, Turin

The Annunciation Triptych is an oil-on-panel triptych by the Netherlandish artist Rogier van der Weyden, dating from around 1434. It was originally formed by three panels, the central one being now at the Louvre museum in Paris, France; the side panels are at the Galleria Sabauda of Turin, Italy.

== Description ==
It is an early work by the Netherlandish artist, with a visible re-elaborations of elements from Robert Campin and Jan van Eyck. The central panel depicts a composition within a domestic interior, with a richly dressed Angel surprising the Virgin who reads a book (a symbol of the Holy Books).

Van der Weyden paid attentions to technical details, such as the shining metallic objects, like the lamp, the jar, the medallion hanging over the bed. The horizon line is elevated like in other contemporary Netherlandish paintings.

The side panels have similar characteristics, but are set in more luminous landscapes, with the elements in the background becoming increasingly invisible in the haze, according to aerial perspective.

== See also ==
- List of works by Rogier van der Weyden

== Sources ==
- Campbell, Lorne (2004). Van der Weyden. London: Chaucer Press. ISBN 1-904449-24-7.
