= Nativity scenes attributed to Zanobi Strozzi =

Painting series by Zanobi Strozzi

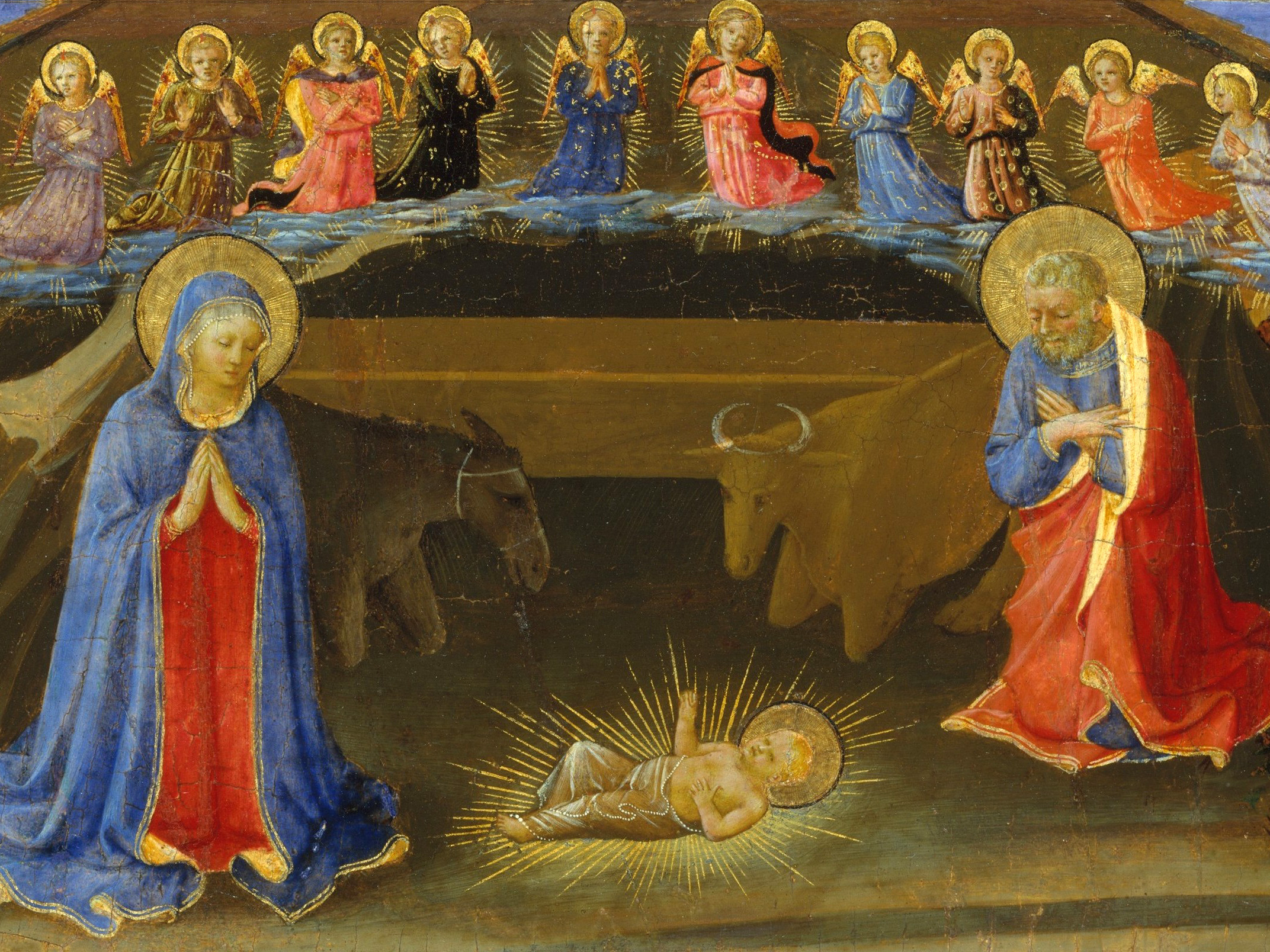
Central figures of the Nativity, Metropolitan Museum of Art

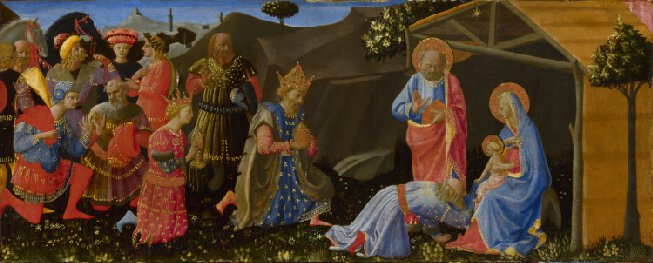
Adoration of the Magi, National Gallery, 19 x 47.4 cm

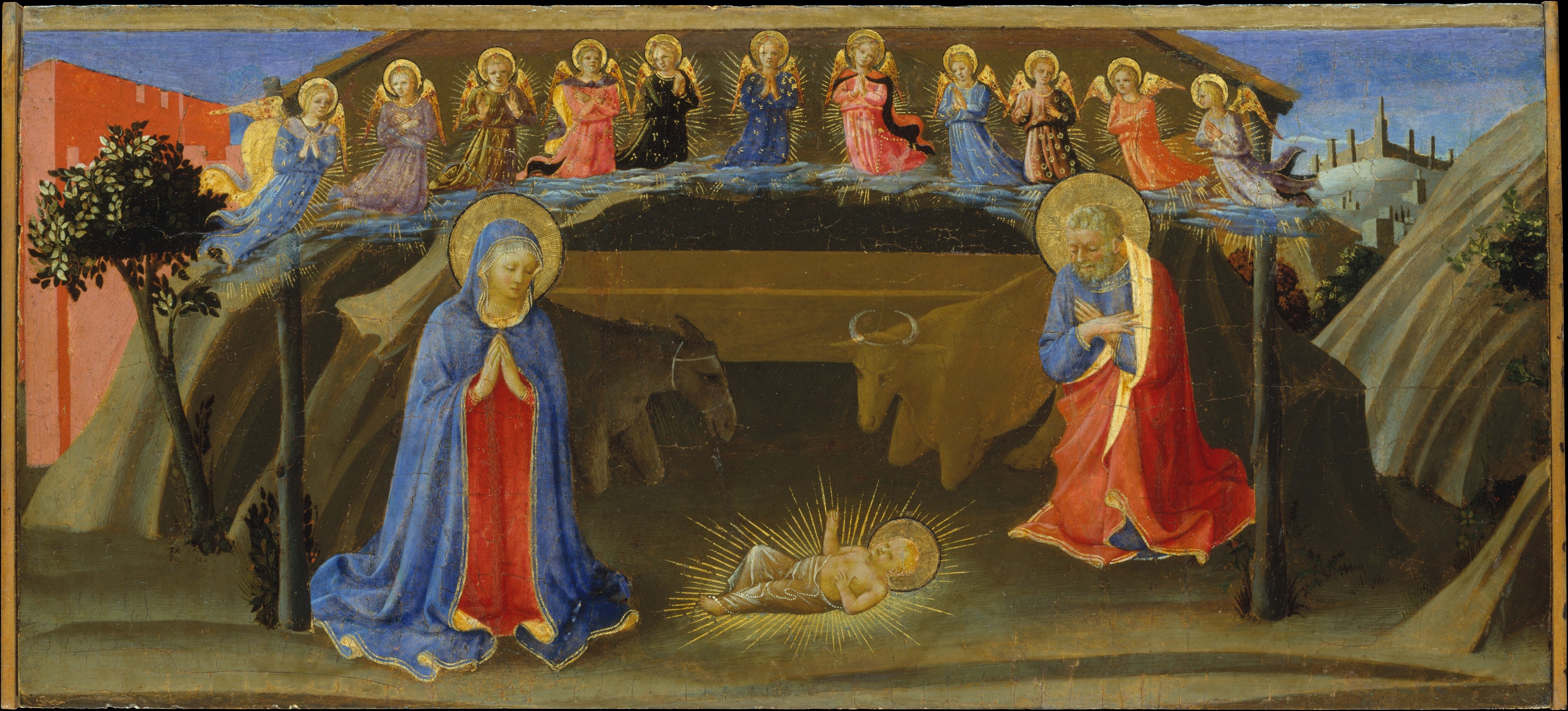
Nativity, Metropolitan Museum of Art, 7 3/8 x 17 1/8 in. (18.7 x 43.5 cm)

Two small paintings in London and New York are believed to come from the same predella, and are attributed to Zanobi Strozzi, a Florentine painter who was probably a pupil of Fra Angelico. They are an Adoration of the Magi in the National Gallery in London, and a Nativity (strictly an Adoration of the Child) in the Metropolitan Museum of Art in New York. They date to about 1433–34 and are in tempera and gold on panel.

Various suggestions have been made as to the authorship of the panels, and the polyptych altarpiece of which the predella formed the lowest part. The two owning museums now agree that these two panels are the only ones to survive from the same predella. The most likely solution is that the altarpiece had as its main panel a Virgin and Child now in the Hermitage Museum, and side panels of saints, namely: "on the left, Saints Nicholas, Lawrence, and John the Baptist (Hyde Collection, Glens Falls, New York), and, on the right, Saints Zenobius, Francis, and Anthony of Padua (Yale University Art Gallery, New Haven)."

There was probably at least one more panel, as the centre of the predella. This might have been a Marriage of the Virgin, or an Annunciation, other core scenes in cycles of the Life of the Virgin. Both John the Baptist and Zenobius were patron saints of Florence, where according to tradition Zenobius had been the first bishop, and Saints Francis and Anthony were Franciscans, suggesting that the altarpiece was made for a Franciscan church in the city. The other two saints, Nicholas and Lawrence, may have been the name saints of people connected to the commission, or reflect the dedication of the original chapel or church.

It remains possible that Fra Angelico himself had a role in the altarpiece; possibly it was sub-contracted by him to Strozzi and perhaps others.

== London Adoration of the Magi ==
The painting shows iconographical details found in other Florentine paintings of the period. Saint Joseph holds the gift of the eldest king, who kneels before the baby Jesus. The gifts of the other two kings are covered with veils. The flowers in the grassy foreground relate to Strozzi's illuminations.

The scale of the figures and horses is not consistent, and one scholar divides the attribution between Strozzi and Battista di Biagio Sanguigni (a.k.a. the Master of 1419), with whom Strozzi lived until 1438. In general the style imitates Fra Angelico's style of the 1430s, and another possibility is that he painted Saint Joseph and the sitting and kneeling figures, generally recognised as being of better quality, while Strozzi contributed the rather cruder other standing figures, which can be considered more typical of his style.

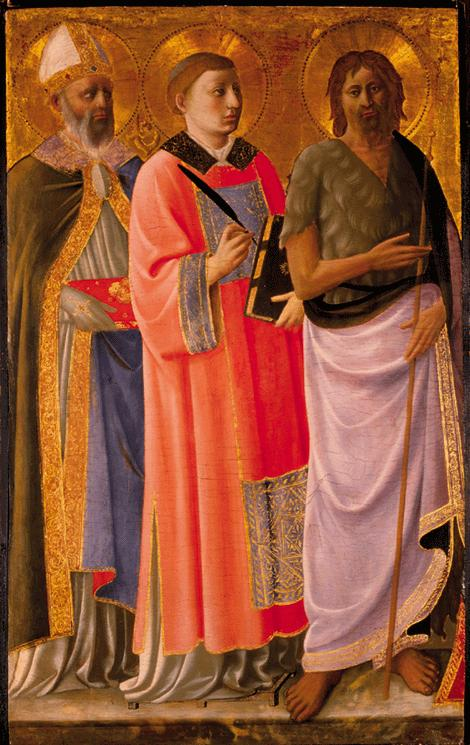
Saints Nicholas, Lawrence and John the Baptist, Hyde Collection, Glens Falls, New York

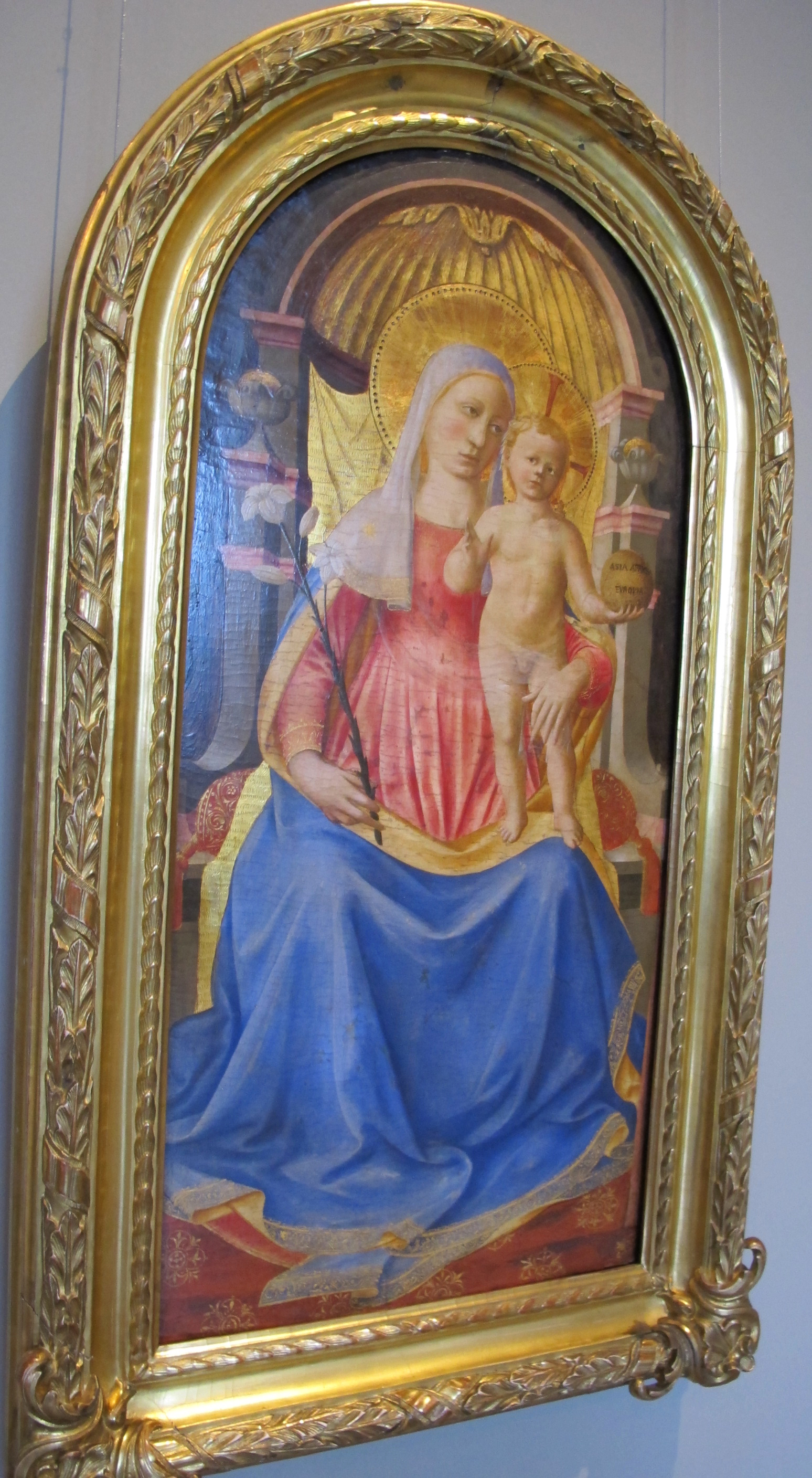
Virgin and Child, Hermitage Museum

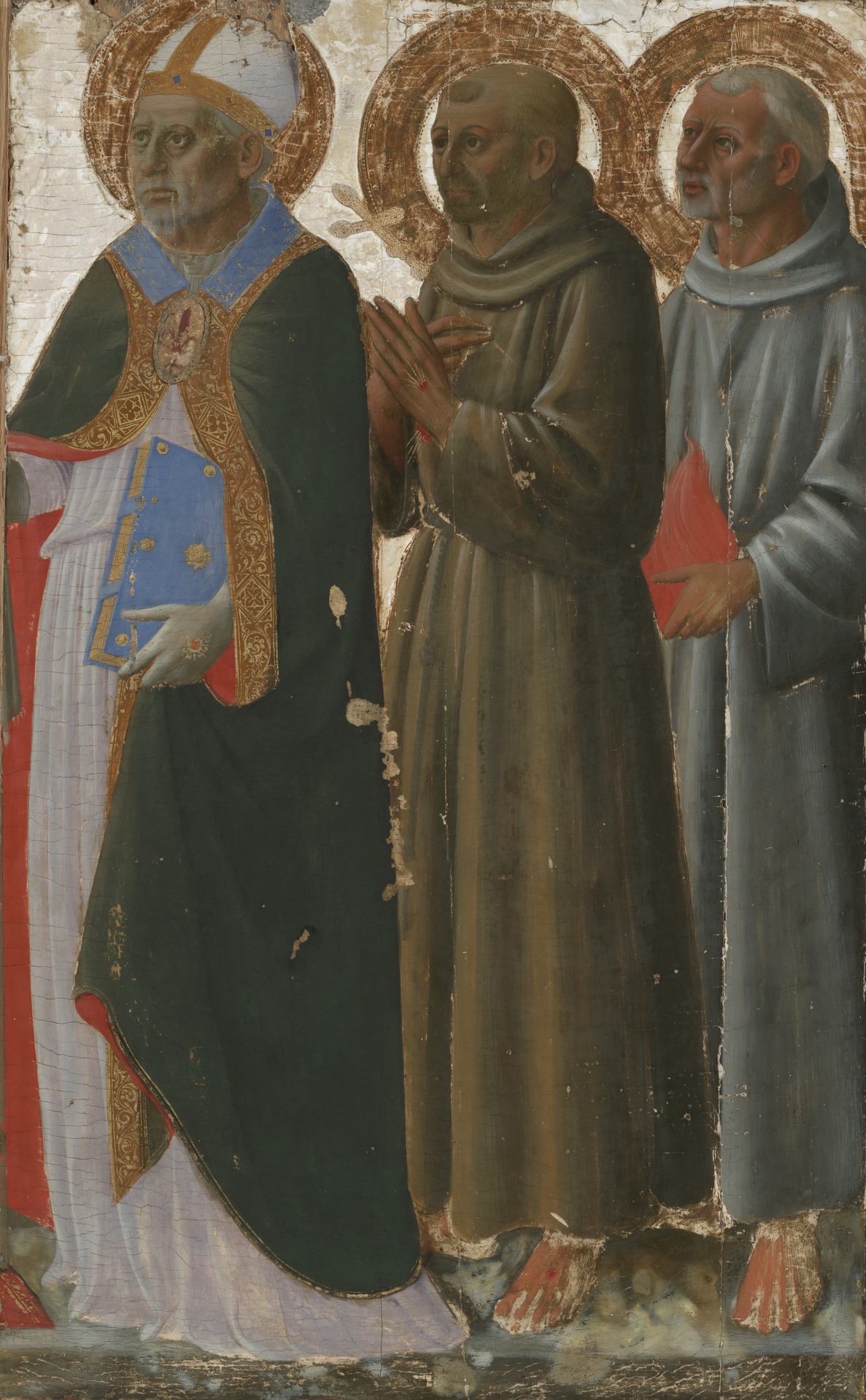
Saints Zenobius, Francis and Anthony of Padua, Yale University Art Gallery, New Haven, 76.5 x 47 cm (30 1/8 x 18 1/2 in.
