= The Procession of the Magi (Zanobi Strozzi) =

Painting by Zanobi Strozzi

- King Balthazar's Journey to the Holy Land
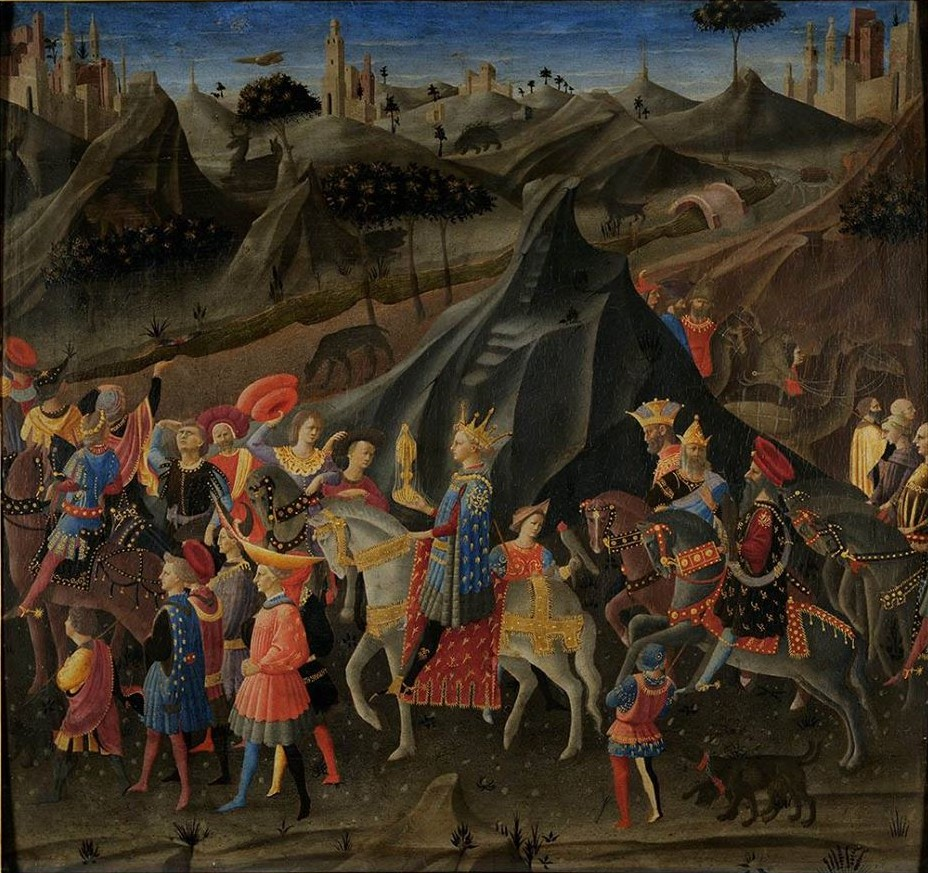
- Artist: Zanobi Strozzi
- Year: between circa 1445 and circa 1450
- Medium: oil paint on panel
- Movement: Quattrocento; Catholic art
- Subject: Adoration of the Magi
- Dimensions: 66.2 cm × 71 cm (26.1 in × 28 in)
- Location: Musée des Beaux-Arts, Strasbourg
- Accession: 1893

The Procession of the Magi, more recently and more precisely known as King Balthazar's Journey to the Holy Land is a mid-1440s or late 1440s painting by the Italian painter from Tuscany, Zanobi Strozzi. It is now in the Musée des Beaux-Arts of Strasbourg, France. Its inventory number is 261.

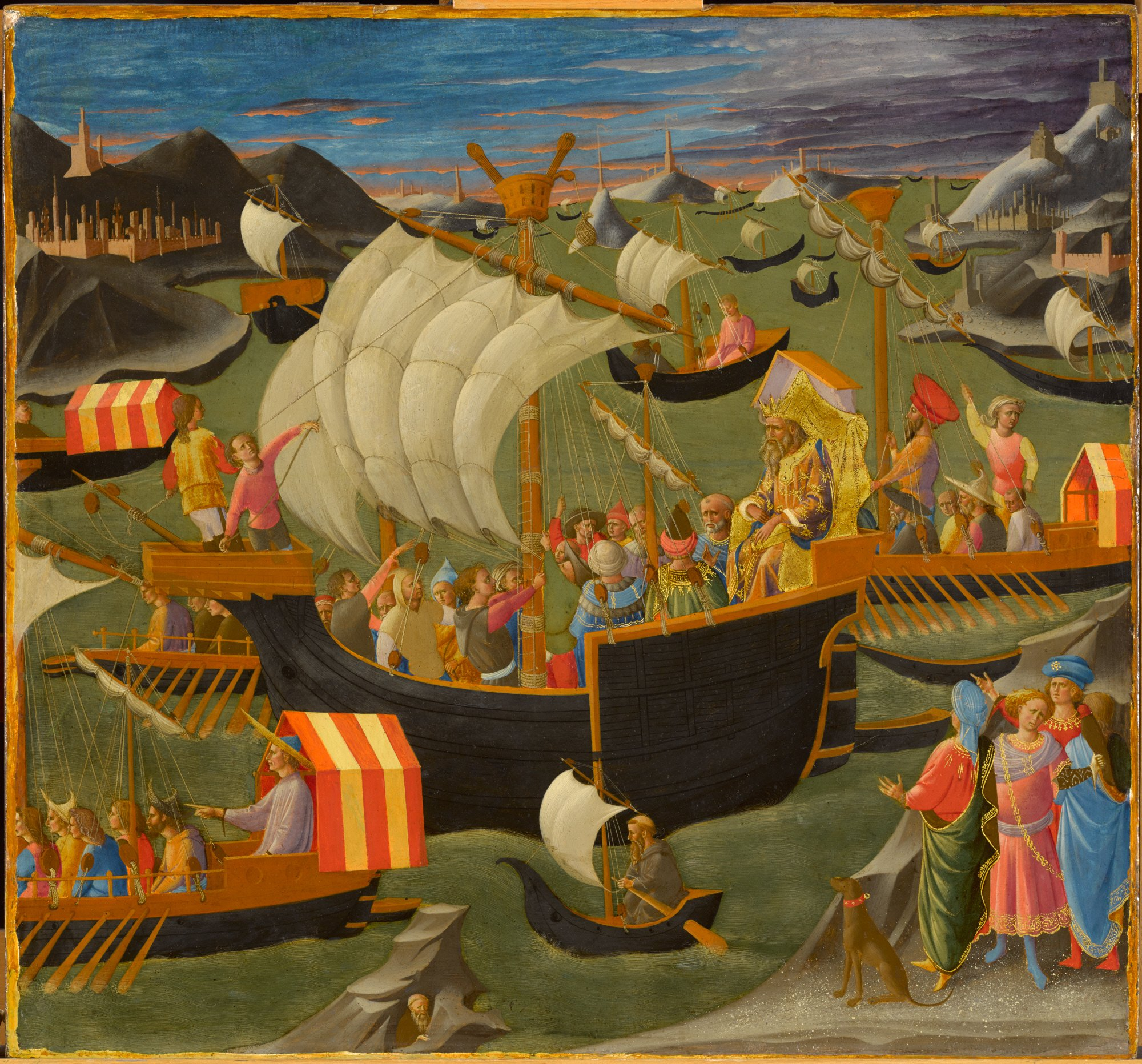
The Pesellino pendant, Williamstown

The painting is today recognized as the pendant of King Melchior Sailing to the Holy Land by Francesco Pesellino now in the Clark Art Institute of Williamstown, Massachusetts. Together with a yet unidentified painting, they may have formed the predella of a yet unidentified altarpiece. Strozzi's painting had at first been attributed to Domenico di Michelino by Bernard Berenson. It is attributed to Strozzi since 1950.

King Balthazar's Journey to the Holy Land had belonged to the collection of Alessandro Castellani, Rome, then to the collection of Charles Butler (1821–1910) in London. At its first sale, on 29 March 1884, it passed from the estate of Castellani into the Butler collection with an attribution to Piero della Francesca, but this was abandoned before Wilhelm von Bode bought the painting for the Strasbourg museum in 1893.

The refined style, the precious colours and the fairy-tale atmosphere of the painting are characteristic of the school of Florentine painting initiated by Fra Angelico, although they were already very much on display in Gentile da Fabriano's Adoration of the Magi (1423).
