= Sanguigni =

Sanguigni is an Italian surname. Notable people with the surname include:

- Armand Sanguigni (1951–1984)
- Domenico Sanguigni (1809–1882)
- Battista di Biagio Sanguigni (fl. 1393-1451), Italian painter
