= King Melchior Sailing to the Holy Land =

Painting by Pisanello

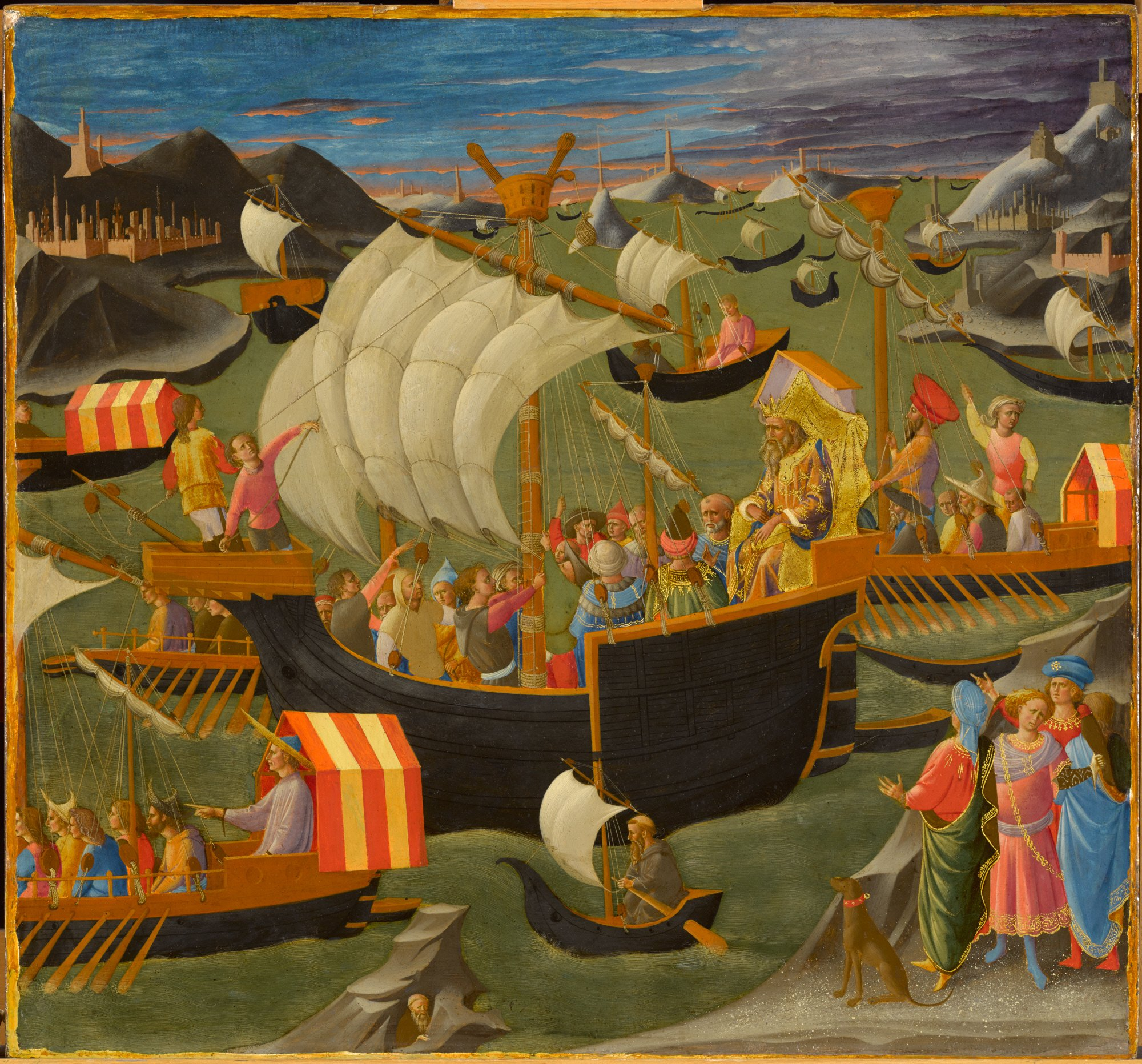
- Artist: Pesellino
- Year: c. 1445-1450
- Medium: Tempera, oil and gold on panel
- Dimensions: 65.1 cm × 69.8 cm (25.6 in × 27.5 in)
- Location: Clark Art Institute, Williamstown, Massachusetts

King Melchior Sailing to the Holy Land is a c.1445–1450 tempera, oil, and gold on panel painting by Pesellino, acquired by Sterling and Francine Clark before 1955 and now in the Clark Art Institute. It is now known to be a pair with or pendant to The Procession of the Magi by Zanobi Strozzi - together with a yet unidentified painting, they may have formed the predella of a yet unidentified altarpiece.
