= Giuliano Pesello =

Italian painter

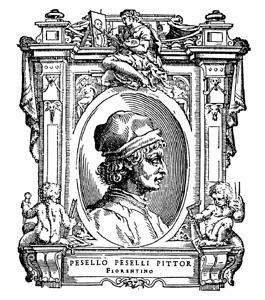
Ritratto di Pesello in Vasari's Lives of the Most Excellent Painters, Sculptors, and Architects.

Giuliano Pesello, born Giuliano d'Arrigo (sometimes spelt Arrigho) (ca. 1367 - 1446), was an Italian painter of the early Renaissance period, active mainly in Florence. He was a pupil of the painter Andrea del Castagno. Vasari states he painted drawings of animals with skill. He is often called Il Pesello.

His son-in-law Stefano di Francesco, also a painter, died in 1427, leaving a very young son, Francesco Pesellino, whom Pesello brought up and trained. Pesellino appears to have inherited his grandfather's studio and became a celebrated painter in his own right.

== Gallery ==
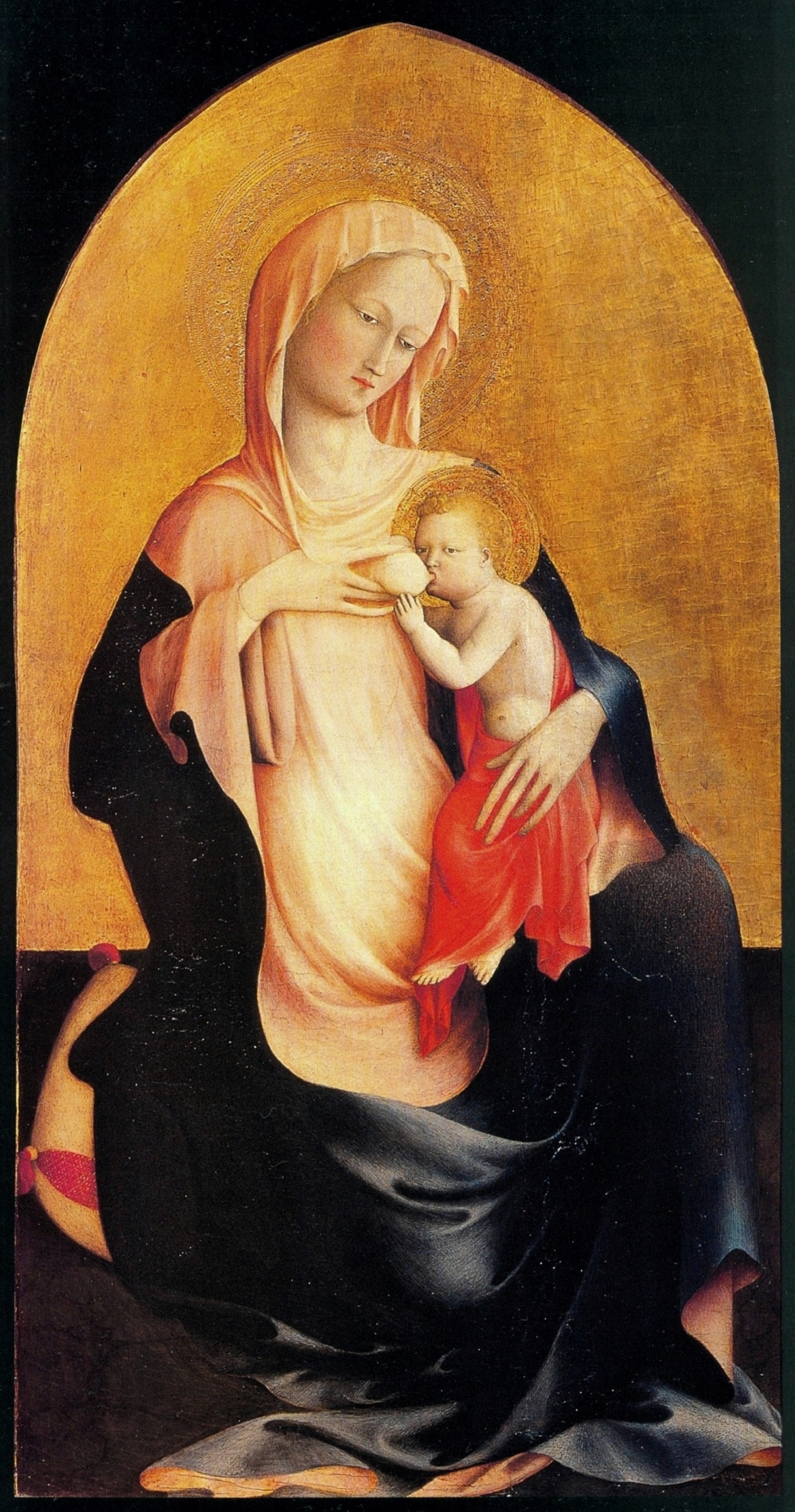
Madonna dell'Umiltà (Madonna of Humility), Firenze

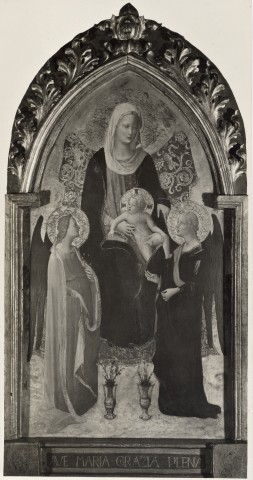
Madonna col Bambino e angeli (Madonna and Child with Angels), Rotterdam

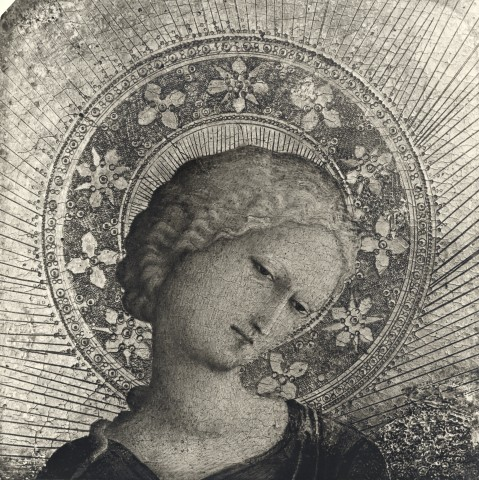
Testa di Madonna (Head of Our Lady), Milan

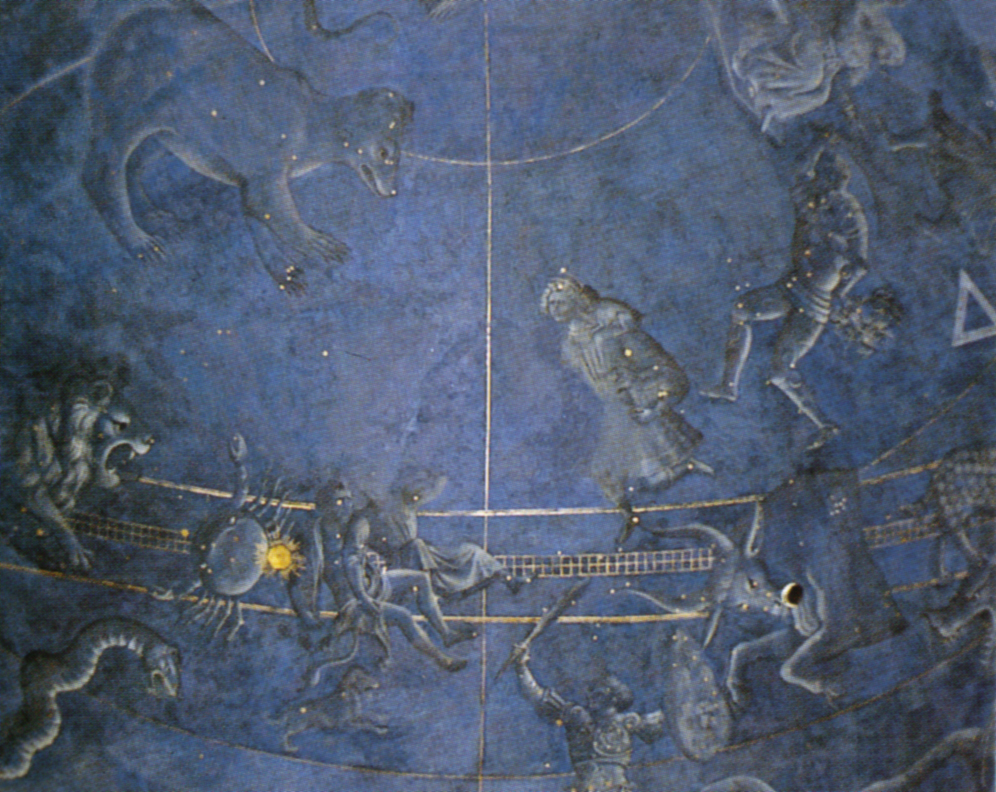
Emisfero celeste (Celestial hemisphere), Sagrestia Vecchia, circa 1442
