= Domenico di Michelino =

Italian painter (1417–1491)

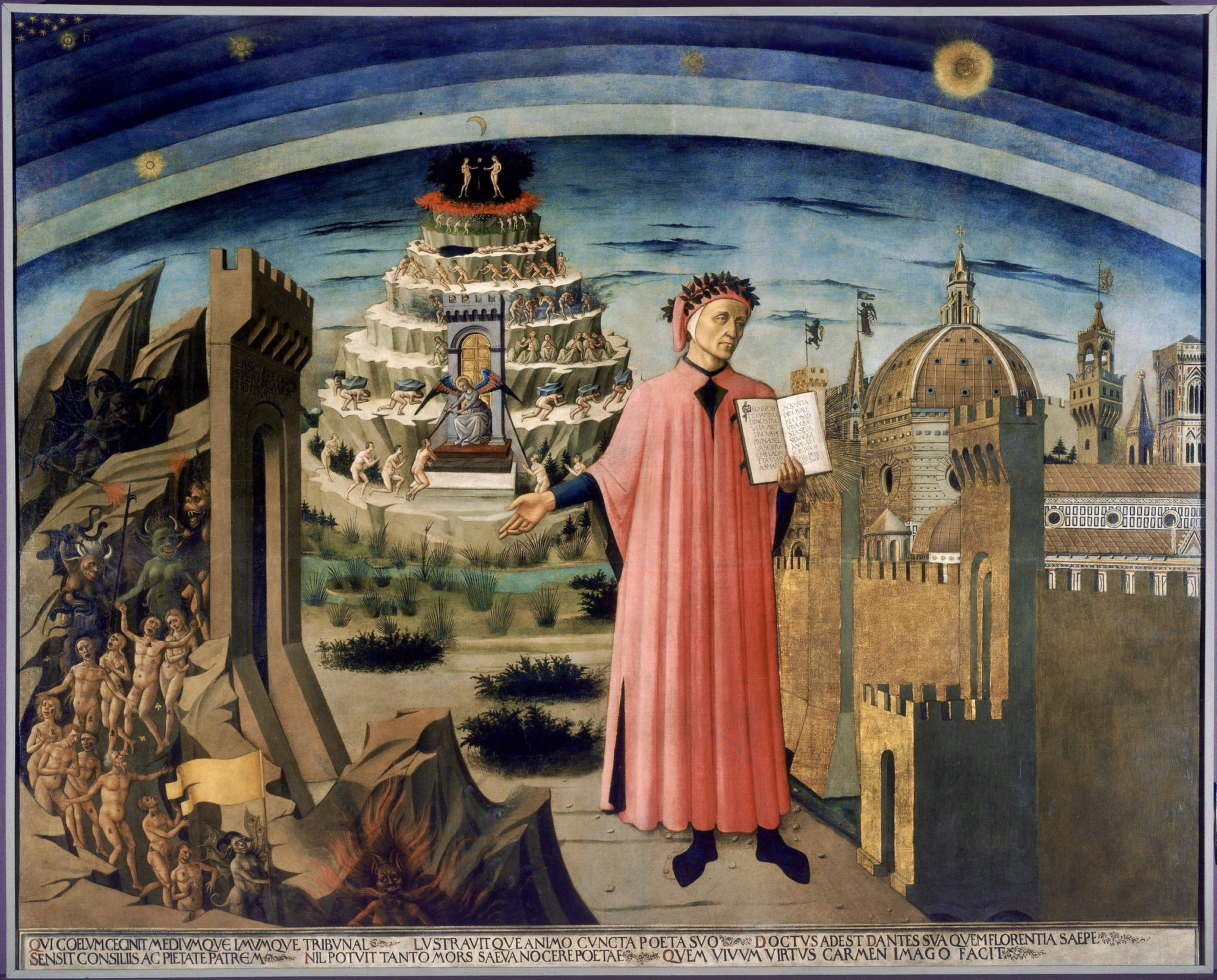
La commedia illumina Firenze on the wall of Florence Cathedral, Santa Maria del Fiore

Domenico di Michelino (1417–1491) was an Italian Renaissance painter who was born and died in Florence. His birth name was Domenico di Francesco. The patronymic "di Michelino" was adopted in honour of his teacher, the cassone painter Michelino di Benedetto (c. 1378-1499), by whom no works have been identified. Giorgio Vasari reports that Domenico was also a pupil of Fra Angelico, whose influence is reflected in many of Domenico's paintings along with that of Filippo Lippi and Pesellino.

Domenico enrolled in the Florentine painters' confraternity, the Compagnia di San Luca, by 1442. Two years later he joined the Arte dei Medici e Speziali, the Florentine painters' guild. He had a workshop in the Via delle Terme, Florence, which he shared with Domenico di Zanobi (formerly known as the Master of the Johnson Nativity).

His earliest extant work is a processional banner for the Ospedale degli Innocenti, Florence, in which the Virgin is shown protecting the martyred innocents beneath her mantle. Commissioned in 1440 and completed in 1446, the picture was entirely repainted in the sixteenth century by Michele Tosini.

In 1449-50 Domenico painted the chapel of Saint Leonard in the church of Santa Maria a Peretola on the outskirts of Florence. The chapel includes a lunette with a scene of Saint Leonard Freeing Prisoners as well as images of Saint Catherine of Alexandria, Saint Lucy and musical angels.

In 1458 Domenico painted an altarpiece of the Madonna and Child with Saints, now at the Alte Pinakothek in Munich, and in 1463 he was commissioned an altarpiece by Cosimo de' Medici for the church of San Girolamo in Volterra (now at the local Museo Diocesano). Other, undated altarpieces are in Anghiari (Santo Stefano), Dijon (Musée des Beaux-Arts), Florence (Galleria dell'Accademia), San Gimignano (Museo Civico) and San Giovanni Valdarno (Museo della Basilica di Santa Maria delle Grazie). A painting of Saint Lawrence at San Lorenzo a Porciano in Stia, painted between 1477 and 1482, is representative of Domenico's late work. In addition to altarpieces, he also made many small-scale paintings of religious subjects, painted the fronts of cassoni, and illuminated manuscripts.

Domenico's most famous work is the Comedy Illuminating Florence on the north wall of the cathedral of Santa Maria del Fiore, Florence. According to documents, the painting was commissioned on 30 January 1465 and was designed by Alesso Baldovinetti. It shows Dante Alighieri presenting his famous poem, the Divine Comedy, to the city of Florence. Views of Hell, Mount Purgatory and Paradise appear in the background, all as described in the poem. It has been suggested that the painting was inspired by Giovanni di Paolo's illumination for Paradiso 17 in the celebrated Yates Thompson Manuscript (c. 1444-1450; London, British Library, Yates Thompson MS 36), one of the finest Divine Comedy manuscripts ever produced, which shows all of the same details but in reverse.

Domenico was still active in 1483 but few of his works from this period survive. He died in Florence on 18 April 1491 and was buried in the church of Sant'Ambrogio.

The art historian Bernard Berenson mistakenly assigned all of Domenico's paintings to Giusto d'Andrea (1440-1496), and misattributed Zanobi Strozzi's paintings to Domenico di Michelino.

== Gallery ==
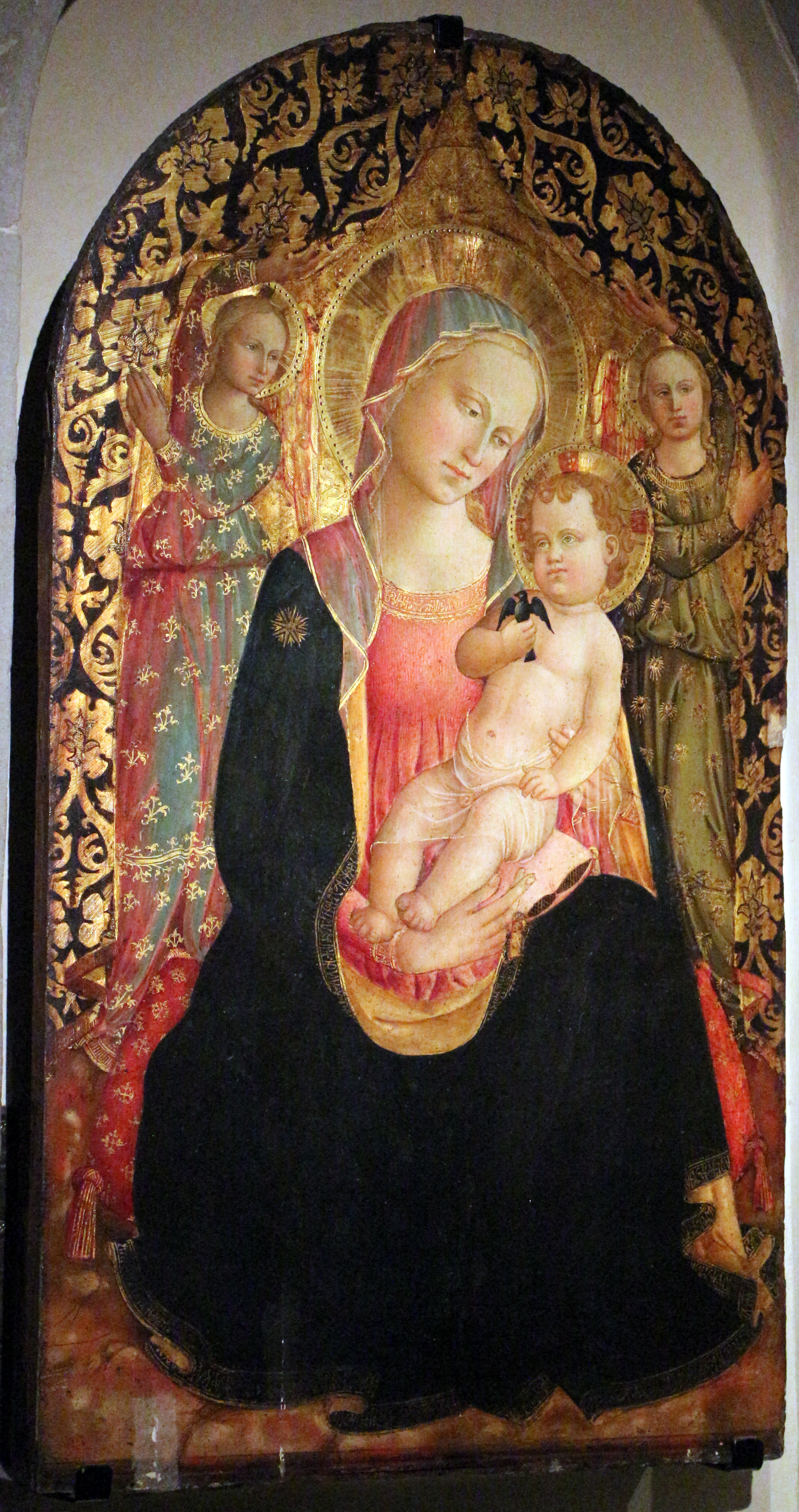
Madonna of Humility, c. 1460

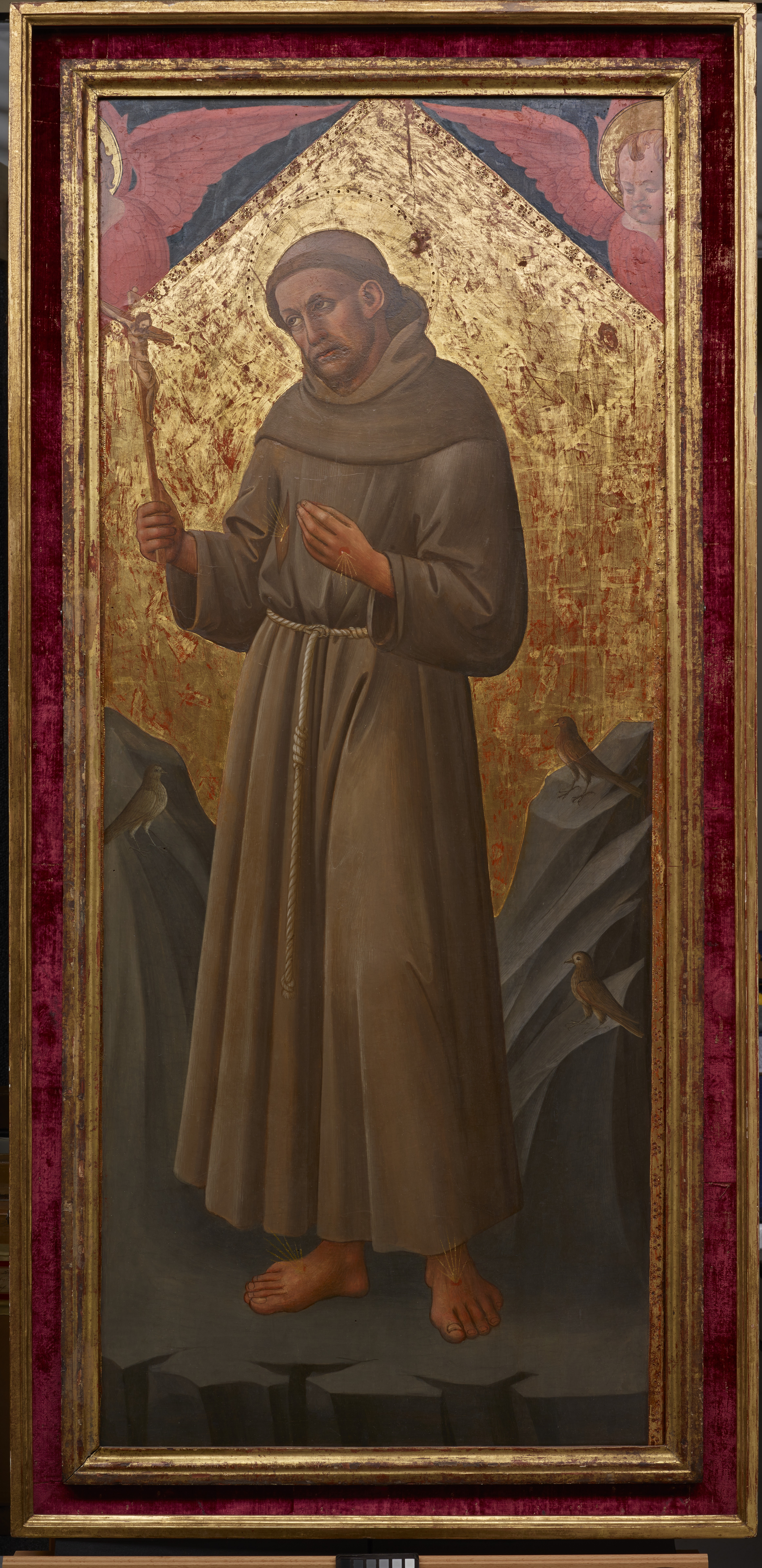
St. Francis of Assisi receives the miraculous stigmata while in prayer on a mountainous retreat in Florence, in the Dallas Museum of Art

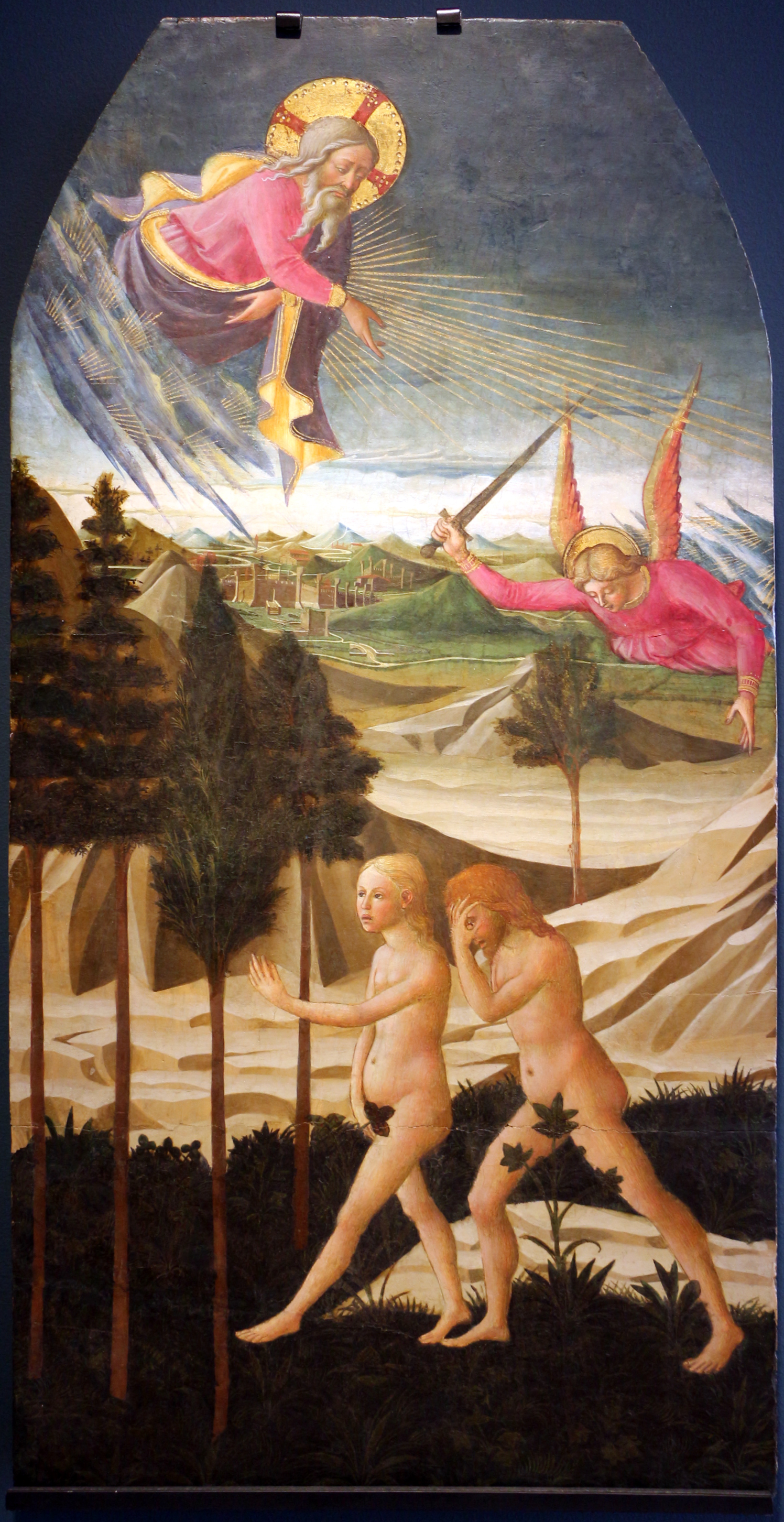
The expulsion from paradise, 1450-1475

== Sources ==
- Web Gallery of Art biography
- World of Dante Multimedia website that features Domenico di Michelino's painting with interactive features.
