= Filippo di Matteo Torelli =

Italian painter

Filippo di Matteo Torelli (active 1440–1468) was an Italian painter and illuminator.

He was a Florentine miniaturist. In the Laurentian library in Florence there is a finely illuminated Evangelistarium by him, with miniatures of the Adoration of the Kings, the Crucifixion, the Resurrection. In conjunction with Zanobi Strozzi, he illuminated some choir books for the Duomo and for San Marco, in Florence. These miniatures were in one time wrongly attributed to Fra Benedetto, the brother of Fra Angelico.
