= Stefano di Francesco =

Italian painter

Stefano di Francesco (died 1427) was an Italian (Florentine) painter, who probably died young, as he left a five-year-old son, and was outlived twenty years by his father-in-law, the painter Giuliano Pesello (1367–1446). His son was the painter Francesco Pesellino (1422–1457), the most distinguished of the three. Nothing is known of Stefano di Francesco's painting.
