= Novitiate Altarpiece =

Painting by Filippo Lippi

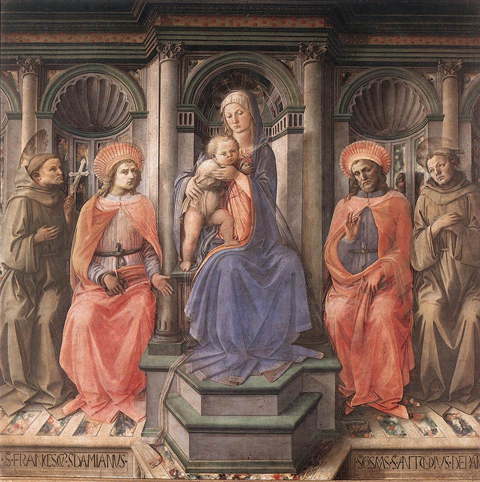
Novitiate Altarpiece (c. 1440–1445) by Filippo Lippi

The Novitiate Altarpiece or Madonna and Child with Saints is a c. 1440–1445 tempera on panel painting by Filippo Lippi, now in the Uffizi in Florence. A sacra conversazione, it originally had a predella painted by Pesellino centred on a Nativity. The main panel shows Cosmas and Damian either side of the Madonna and Child, whilst Francis of Assisi is shown at far left and Anthony of Padua at far right. On an architectural frieze above the figures are the Medici's heraldic balls.

Entirely in Lippi's own hand, it was probably commissioned by Cosimo the Elder, as suggested by the presence of Cosmas and Damian, his family's patrons. It was probably originally intended for the Noviziato chapel in Santa Croce Basilica, of which the Medici were patrons. In 1813, during the Napoleonic suppression of churches and religious houses in Italy, the altarpiece and predella were both taken to Paris. The predella's first two sections remain in the Louvre (St Francis Receiving the Stigmata and The Healing of Justinian the Canon), whilst the last three are now in the Uffizi with the main work (Nativity and two ), accompanied by copies of the two Louvre sections.

The predella
