= Domenico di Zanobi =

Italian painter

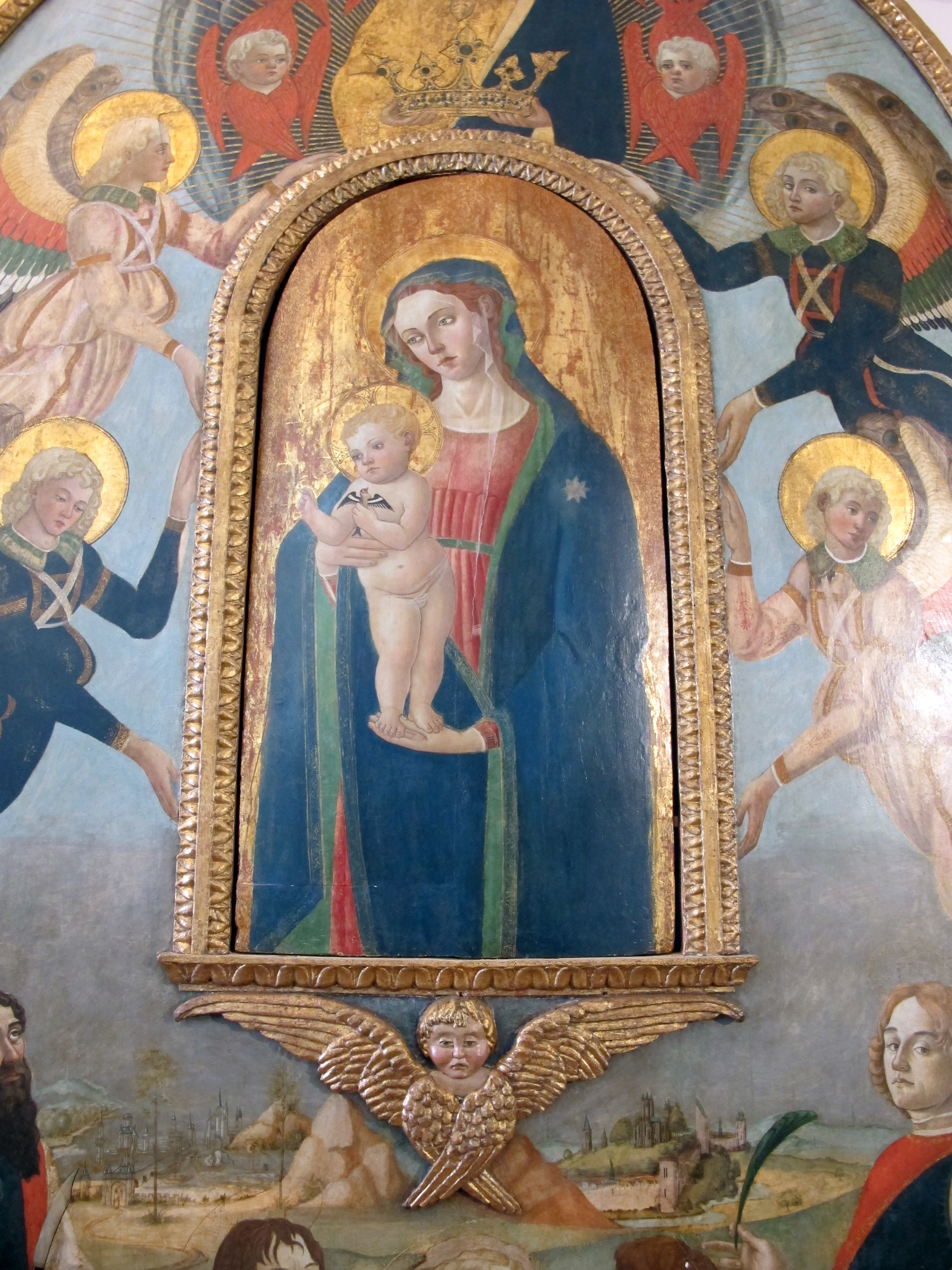
Coronation of the Virgin (detail), 1476. San Miniato, Museo della Misericordia.

Domenico di Zanobi, formerly known as the Master of the Johnson Nativity, was an Italian Renaissance painter. His exact dates of birth and death are not known. He is documented as a mature artist from 1467 until 1481.

Domenico di Zanobi's paintings were first grouped together in 1966 by the American art historian Everett Fahy, who recognized about two dozen paintings in a similar style. Since none of these paintings are signed, Fahy named their artist the "Master of the Johnson Nativity," after the panel of the Nativity in the Johnson Collection at the Philadelphia Museum of Art. In 1996, the Florentine scholar Annamaria Bernacchioni identified this artist as Domenico di Zanobi, a documented assistant of Filippo Lippi in Florence and Prato, based on her discovery of the carpenter's bill for the Coronation of the Virgin at the Museo della Misericordia in San Miniato. This painting, attributed by Fahy to the Master of the Johnson Nativity, was reportedly commissioned by the Chellini family in 1476 from a painter named "Domenico." Since the painting is clearly not by Domenico di Michelino, who also worked for the Chellini family, Bernacchioni suggests that it's by Domenico di Zanobi, who shared a workshop with Domenico di Michelino in Florence's Via delle Terme by 1467. The identification has since found acceptance among art historians.

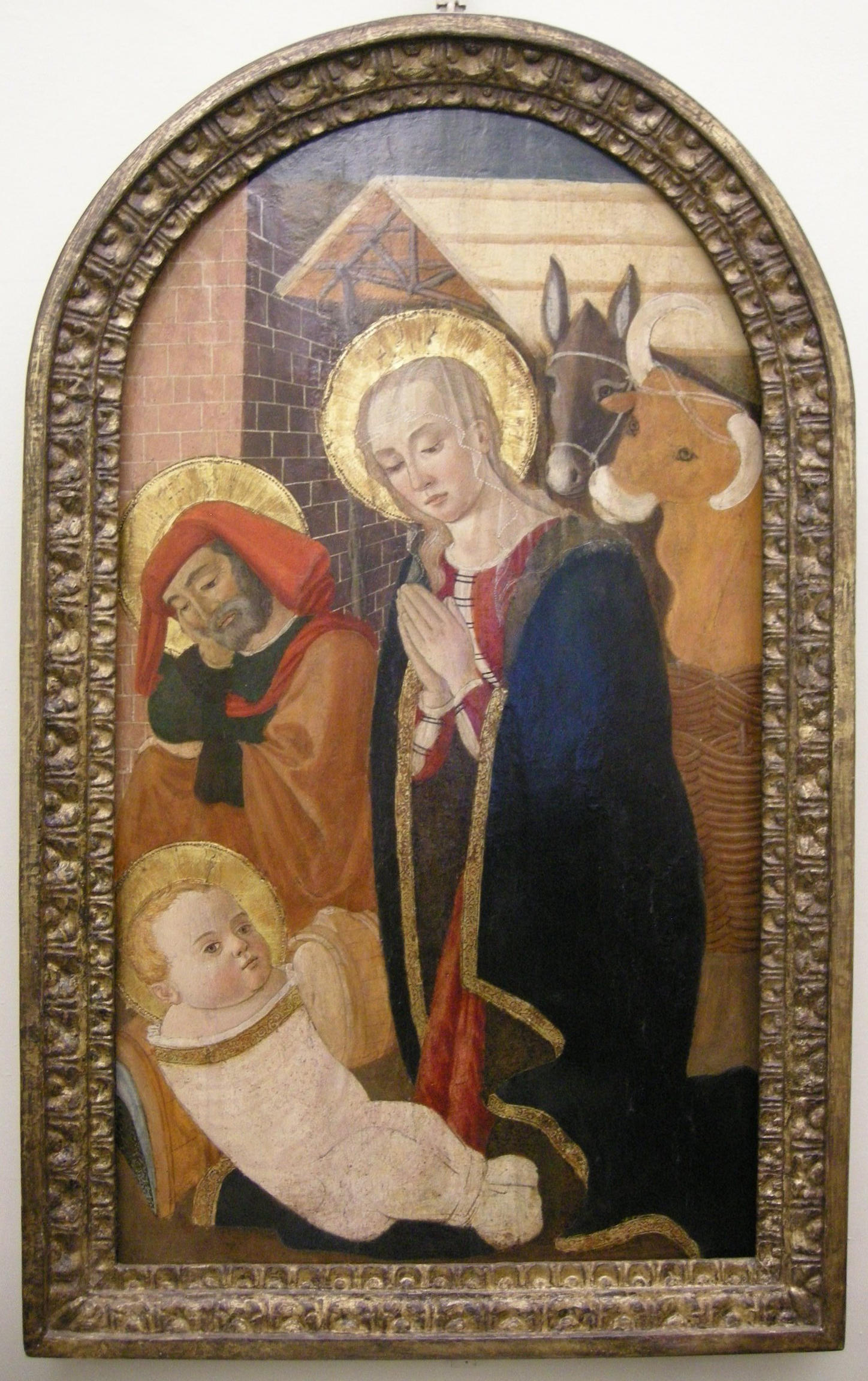
Nativity

Aside from the influence of his teacher, Domenico's art evolved through contact with Andrea del Castagno, Alesso Baldovinetti, and Sandro Botticelli. He also collaborated with the young Filippino Lippi in an Annunciation at the Galleria dell'Accademia, Florence.

He painted primarily religious subjects, including altarpieces and many small panels for private devotion.
