= Pistoia Santa Trinità Altarpiece =

Altarpiece by Francesco Pesellino and Filippo Lippi with his workshop

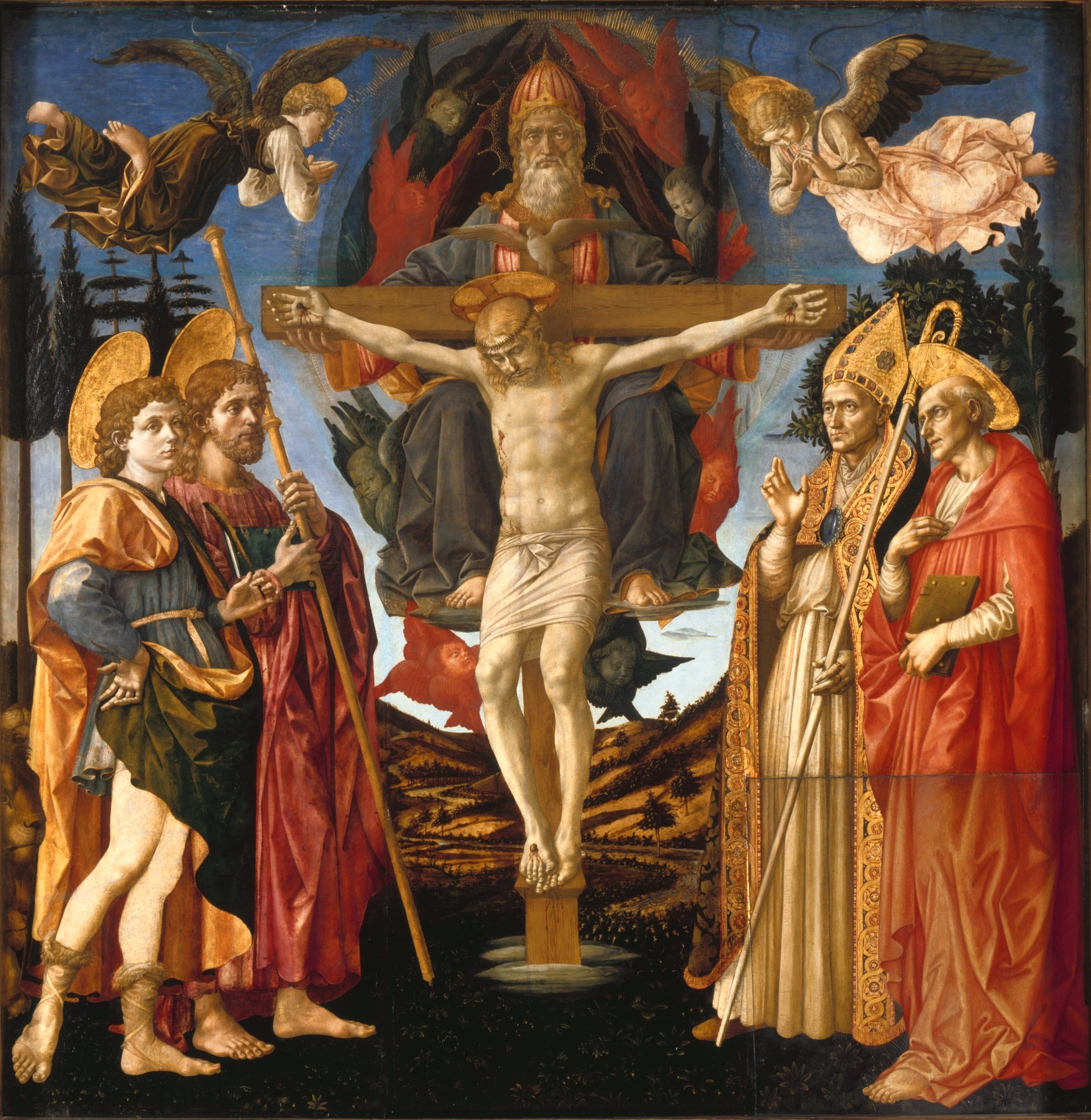
The main panel

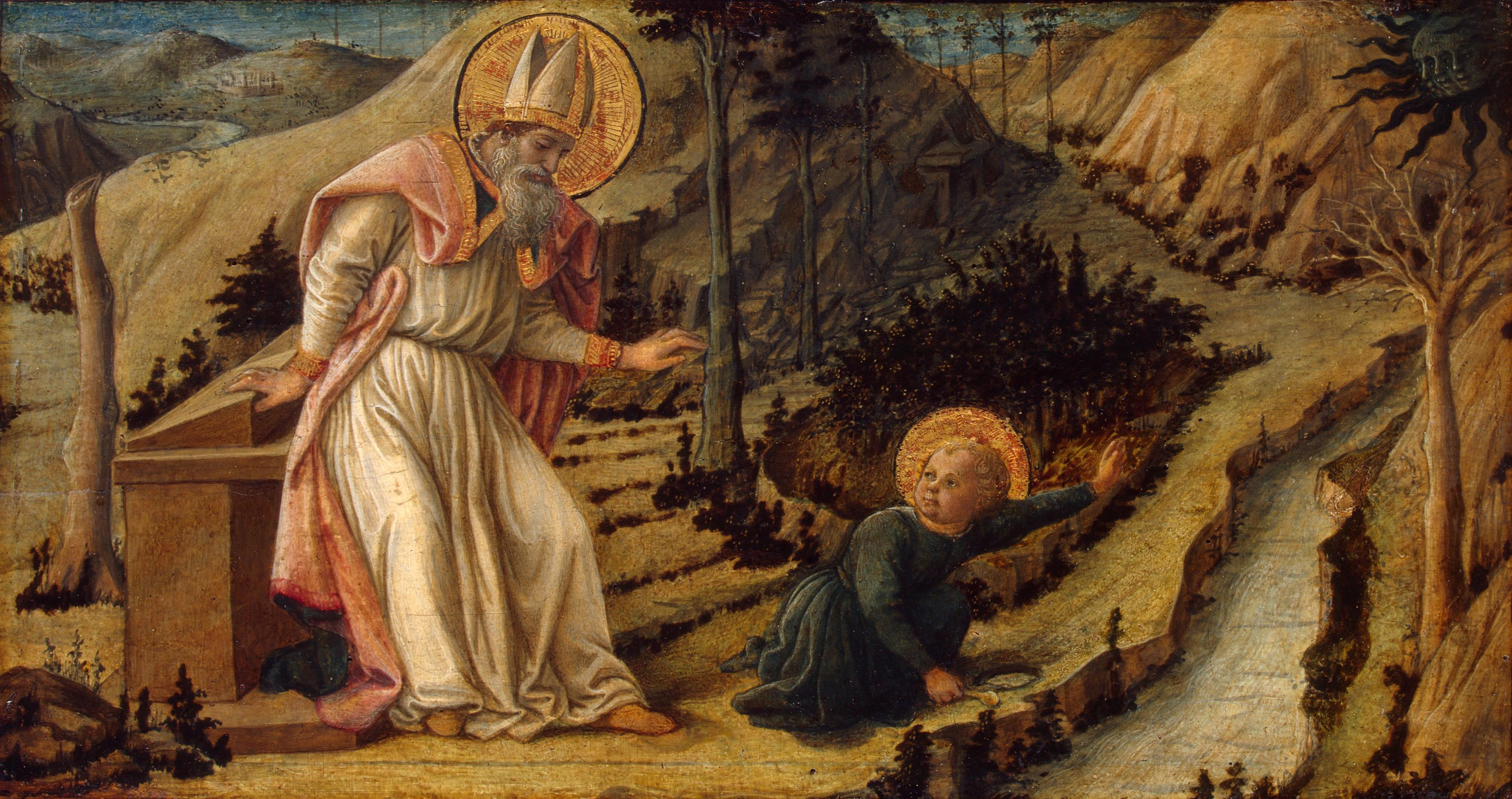
The Hermitage panel

The Pistoia Santa Trinità Altarpiece is a 1455-1460 egg tempera, tempera grassa and oil on wood painting, begun by Pesellino and completed by Fra Filippo Lippi and his workshop. The main panel of the work is today in the National Gallery in London.

== Description ==
The main panel is about 1.8 meters square. The Holy Trinity is depicted as the "Throne of Mercy" with God the Father supporting the Crucified Christ in his lap, with to the left Saint Mamas (Note: An Anatolian saint rarely portrayed in Western European art, possibly chosen in reference to hopes for reunification of the Eastern and Western Churches in the wake of the 1439 Union of Florence.) and Saint James the Great and to the right Saint Zeno and Saint Jerome.

The altar front, depicting the Virgin of Mercy, was formerly at the Gemäldegalerie, Berlin, and was destroyed in 1945.

== Predella ==
From left to right, the predella shows:

- Saint Mamas in prison before being thrown to the lions
- The beheading of Saint James
- Saint Zeno casting out a demon from the emperor Gallienus’s daughter
- Saint Jerome with his lion

A work in the Hermitage Museum previously identified as a fifth predella panel (Saint Augustine's Vision of the Christ-Child by a River (Note: Augustine sees the child trying to empty a river by pouring its water down a hole with a spoon. On being asked what he is doing, the child answers that it is even more futile for finite human minds to try to understand God than to try emptying a river with a spoon. The vision does not originate in Augustine's own writings but in an interpolation into an English translation of the Golden Legend printed in 1483 by William Caxton.)) is no longer thought to be so.

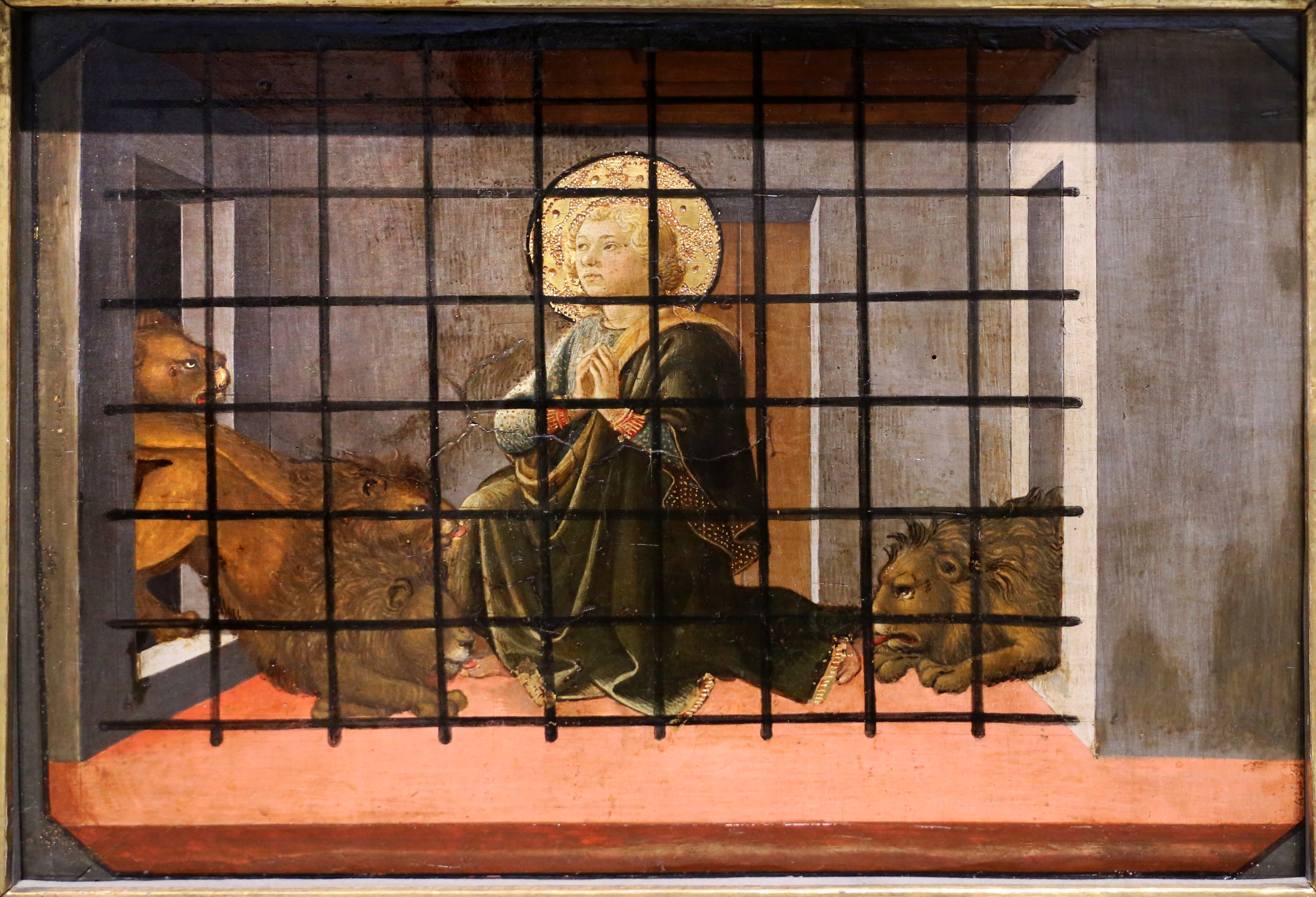

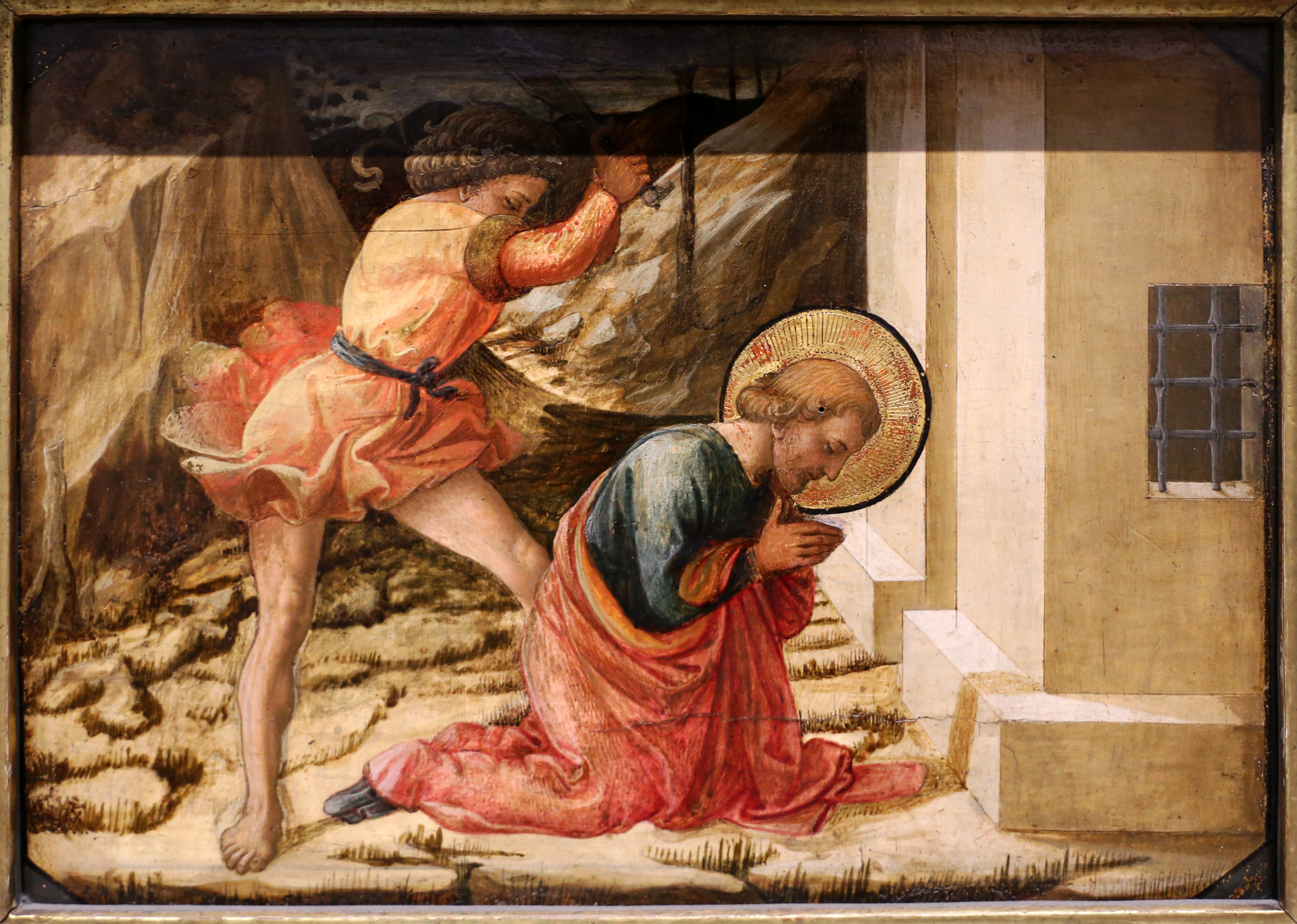

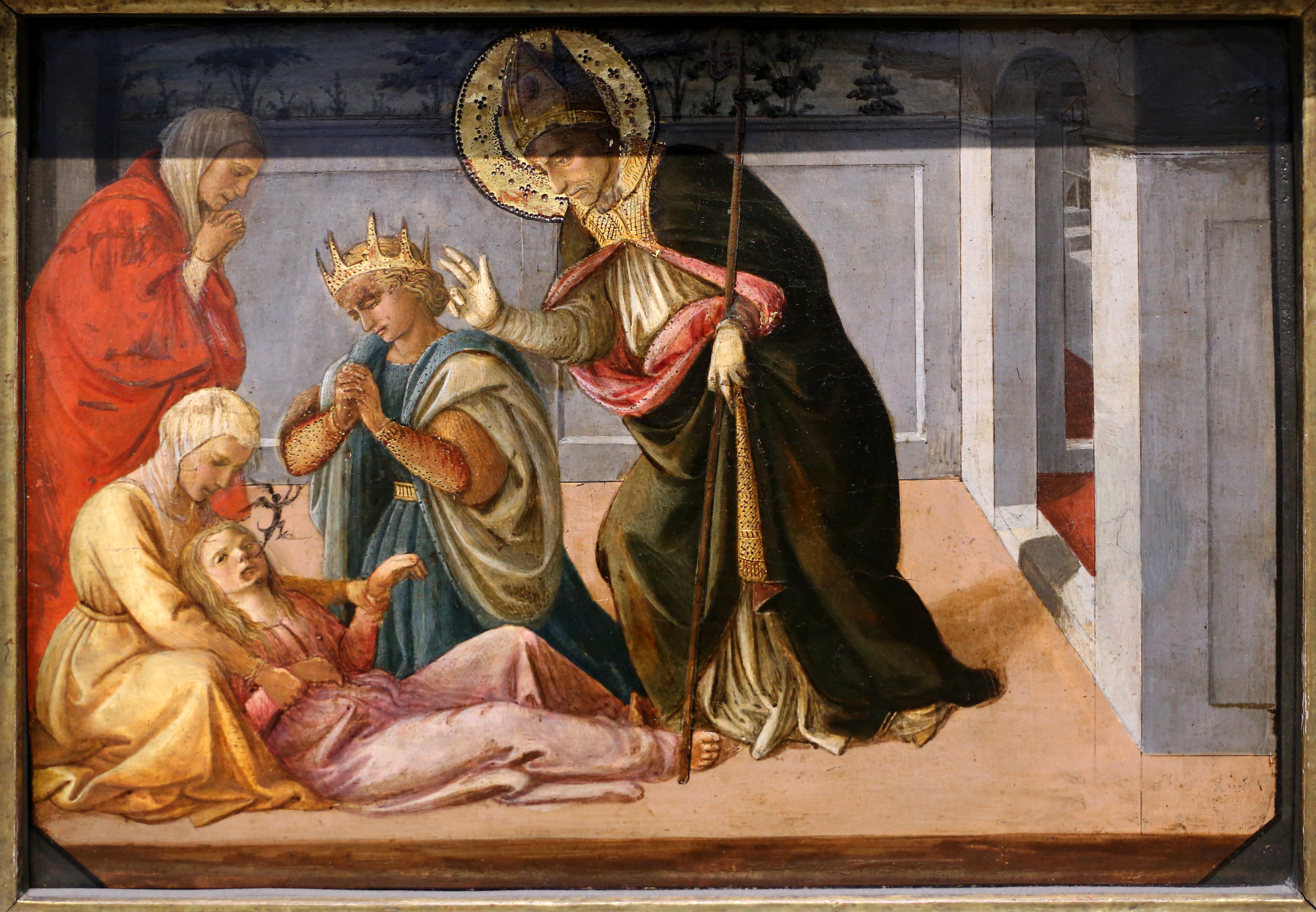

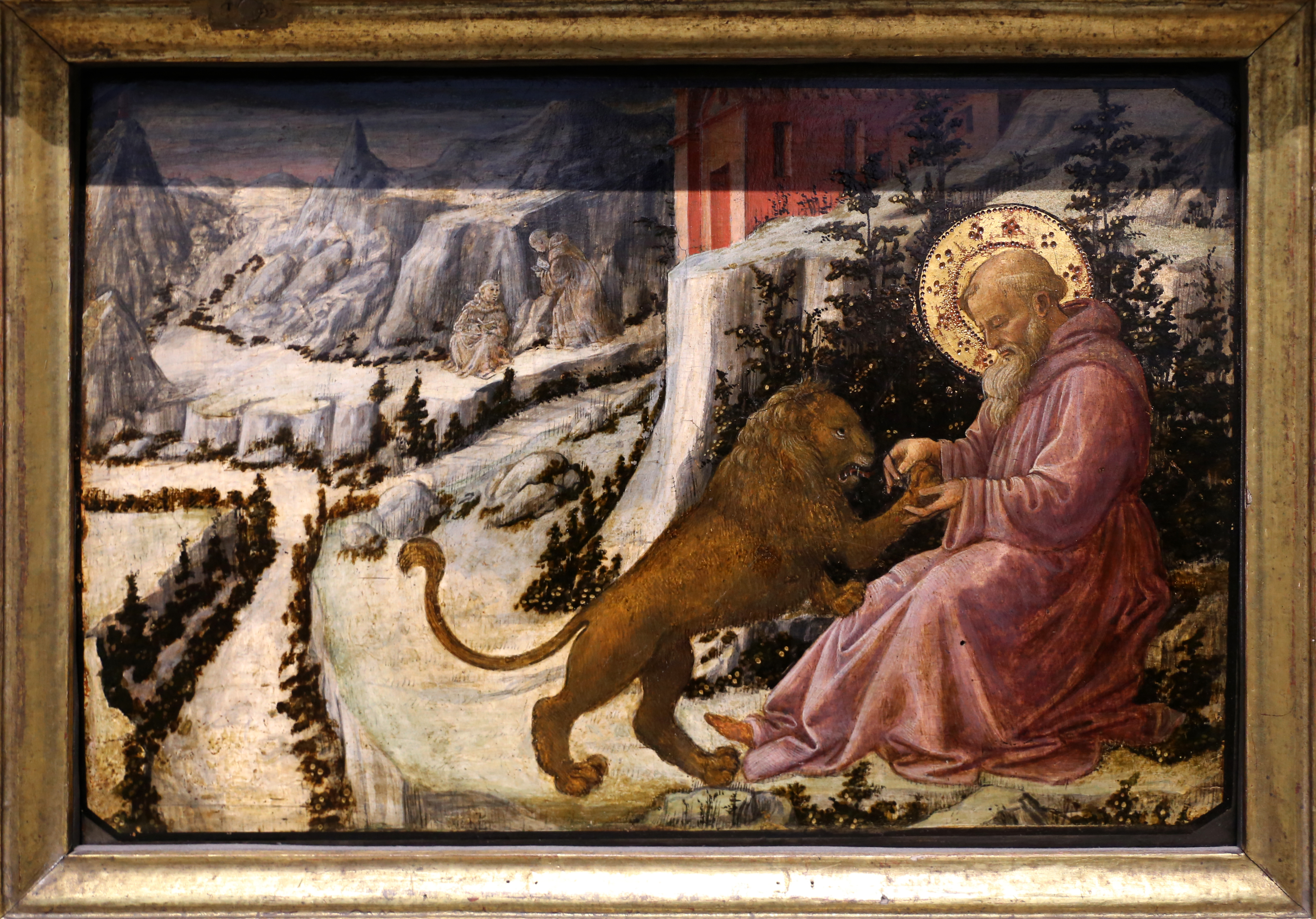

== History ==
It was commissioned from Pesellino as the high altarpiece for the eponymous church in Pistoia in 1455, but he died only two years later and it was completed by the addition of a predella and an altar front by Fra Filippo Lippi and his workshop. The commission is unusually well documented. The documents provide a detailed account of the commissioning process and the painting's completion and delivery. They also tell how on Pesellino's death in 1457, his widow began litigation against Pesellino's business partner over the cost of the unfinished work. A number of preparatory drawings for the painting also survive.

It remained on the altar for which it was commissioned from 1465 to 1793, when the confraternity running the church was suppressed. The work was sawn into six pieces, probably soon after the suppression, with the section showing the Trinity owned by the Reverend Walter Davenport Bromley and William Young Ottley before being bought by the National Gallery, London in 1863. The National Gallery also acquired the two angels at the top of the main panel in 1917 by bequest and purchase, the Saints Zeno and Jerome section via the Art Fund and Joseph Duveen in 1929 and all four predella panels as a gift from Felix Warburg and his wife via the Art Fund in 1937, thus making it the earliest pala altarpiece (one centred on a large main panel) in its collections.

Meanwhile, the section showing Saints Mamas and James was acquired by Queen Victoria from Warner Ottley (Note: Brother of William Young Ottley and buyer of many works from his collection after the latter's death) via Ludwig Gruner as a birthday gift to Albert, Prince Consort in 1846 and remains in the Royal Collection, though it is on long-term loan to the National Gallery. One fragment at the bottom right of the main panel showing Saints Zeno and Jerome's legs is still lost and replaced by a modern reconstruction.
