= Story of David Panels =

Paintings by Pesellino

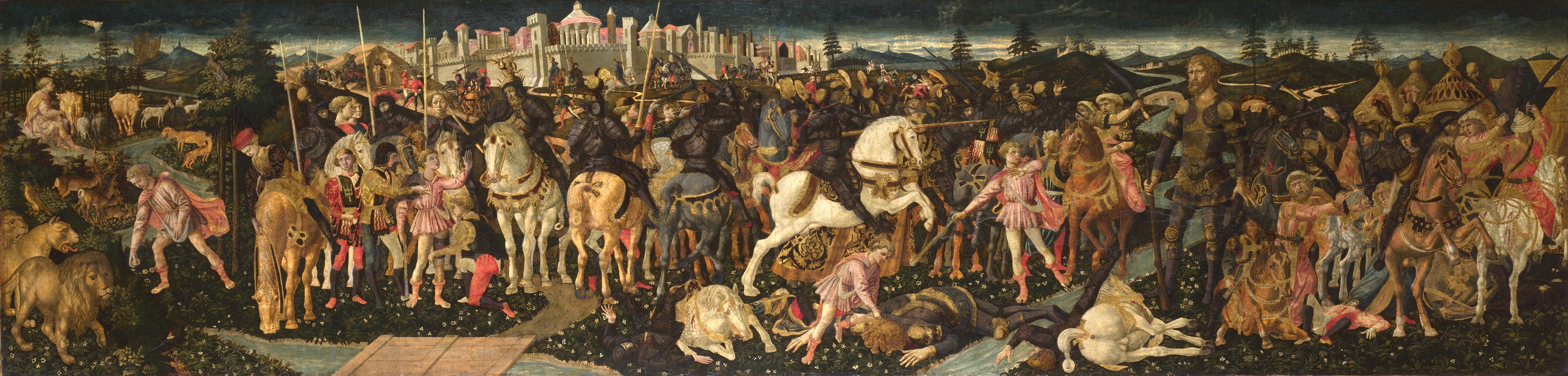
David and Goliath

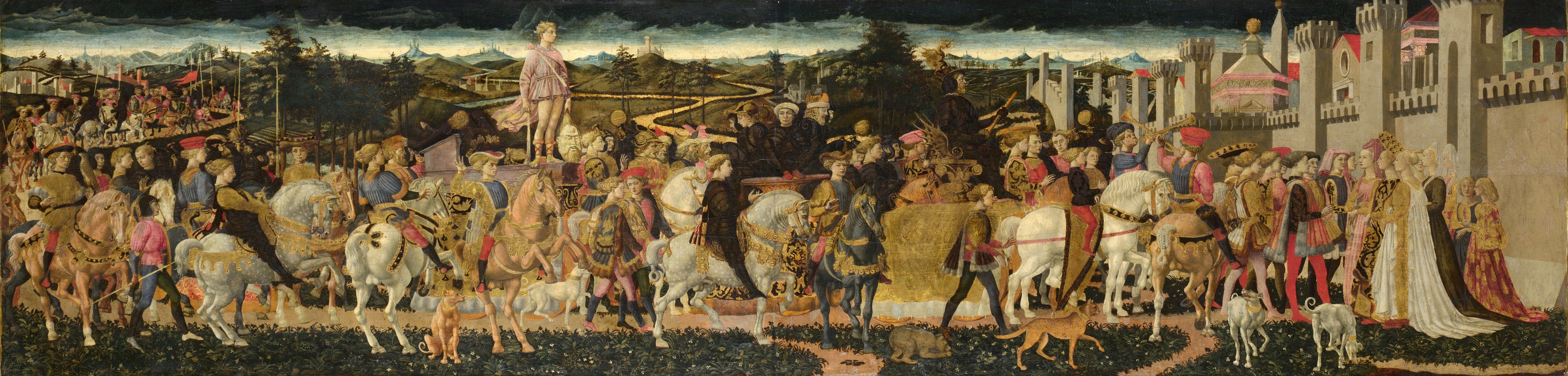
Triumph

The Story of David Panels are two c. 1445–1455 rectangular tempera on panel paintings by Pesellino, individually entitled The Story of David and Goliath and The Triumph of David. They were probably set into the panelling of a private room, perhaps above a chest, though Medici emblems within them suggest they may have originally been part of a pair of cassoni for the marriage of a member of that family. They are both in the National Gallery, London, which acquired them together in 2000 with assistance from the Art Fund.
