= Zanobi Strozzi =

Italian painter (1412–1468)

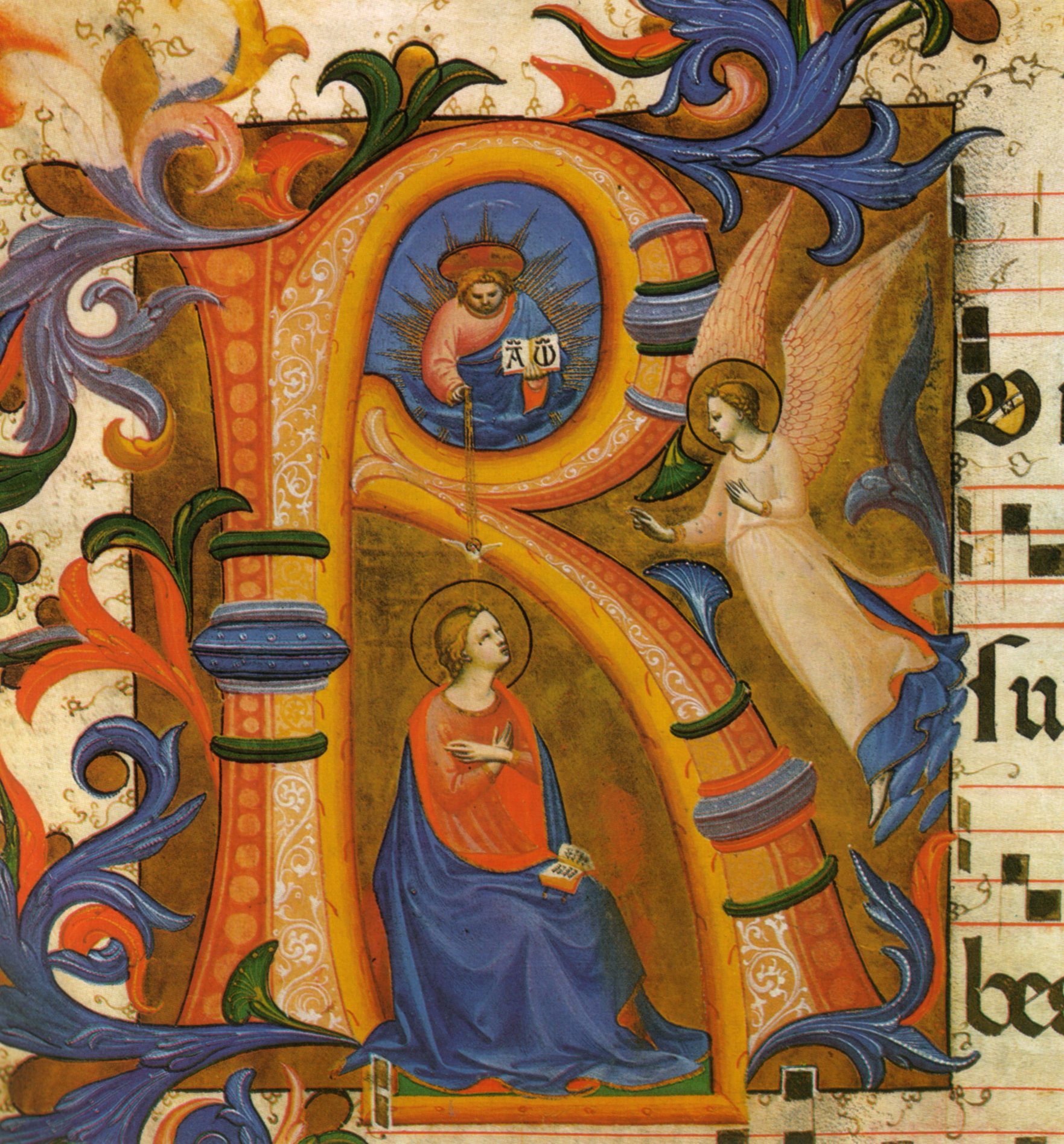
Annunciation

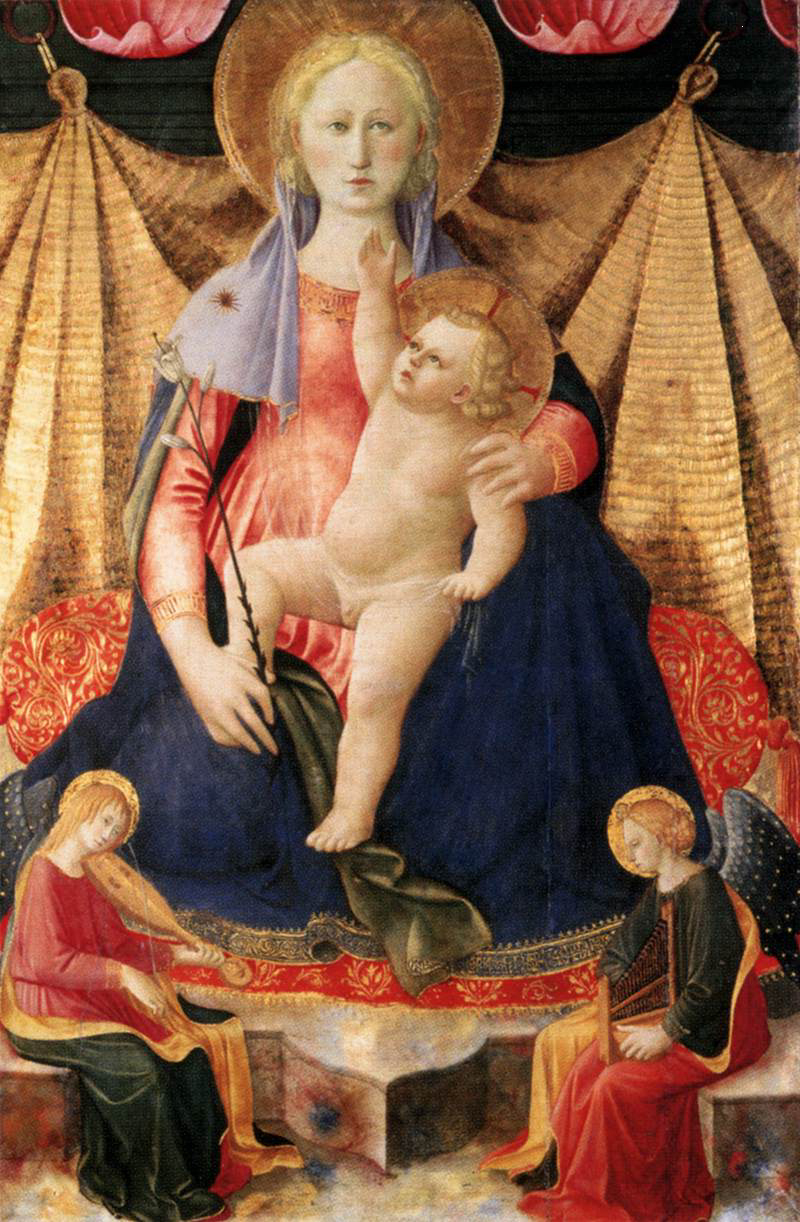
Madonna of Humility with Two Musician Angels, Museo Poldi Pezzoli

Zanobi di Benedetto di Caroccio degli Strozzi (17 November 1412 – 6 December 1468) was an Italian Renaissance painter and manuscript illuminator active in Florence and nearby Fiesole. He was closely associated with Fra Angelico, probably as his pupil, as told by Vasari. He is the same painter as the Master of the Buckingham Palace Madonna. Most of his surviving works are manuscript illuminations but a number of panel paintings have also been attributed to him, including seven altarpieces and six panels with the Virgin and Child, along with some designs for metalwork.

Vasari says Strozzi "painted pictures and panels for a great many private houses in Florence"; he also mentions a double portrait. Strozzi may have been something of a pioneer in small narrative pictures for homes, which departed from the usual subject of the Virgin and Child.

He was one of the most important Florentine illuminators of his day, with documents confirming his participation in at least eighteen surviving manuscripts (in which he often worked as but one of a group of artists). This stands in contrast to his paintings; except for one signed work in London's National Gallery, all of his paintings are attributed to him on the basis of style alone.

== Biography ==
Strozzi was born in Florence on 17 November 1412. He was a member of the extended Strozzi family, a wealthy and noble clan that rivaled the Medici family. After he was orphaned at age 15, Strozzi went to live with the artist Battista di Biagio Sanguigni, described in documents as his "tutor" but more probably also his teacher in the art of painting and illumination. Sometime between 1427 and 1430 the pair moved to Fiesole, about five miles from Florence.

Strozzi is not recorded as joining the Florentine painters' guild the Arte dei Medici e degli Speziali, thereby precluding him from contracting paintings (as opposed to illuminations) under his own name in Florence. His commissions must thus have been received on behalf of other artists, like Sanguigni or Fra Angelico, who according to Vasari was another of Strozzi's teachers. Strozzi and Sanguigni would have both met Angelico in the 1430s at the convent of San Domenico, Fiesole, Angelico's base until 1436.

In 1438 Strozzi married and moved into a new house in the same parish in Fiesole. Before that he was sharing a house with Sanguigni. When Fra Angelico moved to Rome in 1446, Strozzi moved to Florence, where he rented a house in the parish of San Paolo, near Santa Maria Novella. In 1450 he bought a house in another parish. On his death in 1468 he was buried in Santa Maria Novella, Florence.

== Works ==
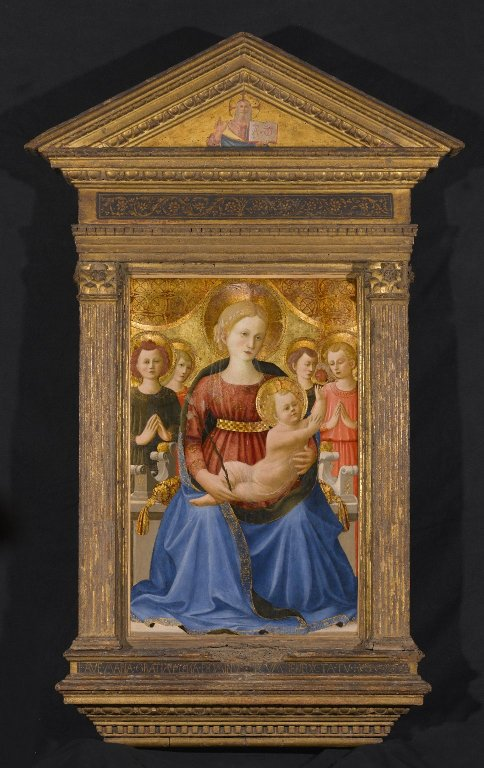
Virgin and Child with Four Angels and the Redeemer, c. 1450, Brooklyn Museum.

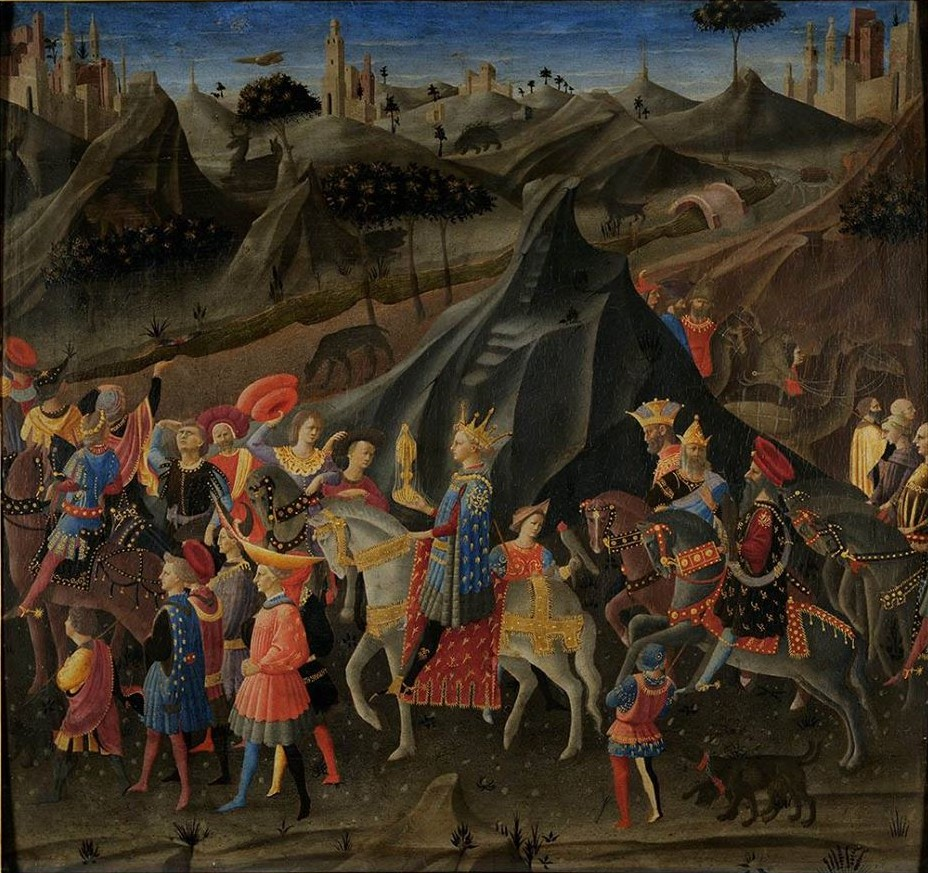
The Procession of the Magi, between ca. 1445 and 1450 (Musée des Beaux-Arts de Strasbourg, France)

=== Panel paintings ===
Strozzi's only "signed" painting is an Annunciation for the church of San Salvatore al Monte, Florence (c. 1440–45), now in the National Gallery, London. The painting's signature is semi-hidden in the decorated gold border to the Virgin's dress, where can be seen "Z" (reversed), followed by "A", then after a gap filled with ornament, "NOBI".

An altarpiece of unknown provenance, now split between several museums, has been attributed to Strozzi. The main panel of this work was the Virgin and Child at the Hermitage Museum. The side panels, of which there were two, comprised the Saints Nicholas, Lawrence, and John the Baptist, now at the Hyde Collection, Glens Falls, New York, at the left, and the Saints Zenobius, Francis, and Anthony of Padua at the Yale University Art Gallery, New Haven, on the right. The continuation of the floor and the figures' draperies across all three panels proves that they originally belonged together as a single altarpiece. A Nativity at the Metropolitan Museum of Art in New York and Adoration of the Magi in the National Gallery in London might have also belonged to this altarpiece as parts of its predella.

Around 1460, Strozzi painted an altarpiece for the convent of San Girolamo in Fiesole (Musée du Petit Palais, Avignon). This commission was awarded by the Medici, whose newly constructed villa in Fiesole was located a short distance from the convent.

Several paintings by Strozzi described in archival documents are now lost. Between 1434 and 1439 he painted a panel for the choir screen of the church of Sant'Egidio, Florence, perhaps identifiable with the Madonna and Child with Four Angels today at the Museum of San Marco in Florence. He also painted a painted crucifix for San Marco, recorded in 1448. Vasari mentions a double portrait of Giovanni di Bicci de' Medici (d. 1429), founder of the Medici family fortune, and his ally, Bartolommeo di Taldo Valori. In Vasari's day the portrait was in the bedroom of Cosimo I de' Medici, Grand Duke of Tuscany.

A large Last Judgement by Strozzi for the convent of San Benedetto Porta a Pinti, Florence, was one of many paintings that disappeared from the Berlin State Museums in World War II. A smaller version of the subject is in a private collection.

Of his six Virgin and Child panels, five use the popular Madonna of Humility type, in which the Virgin sits low on the ground on a cushion instead of a throne. The earliest of these, in the Royal Collection, gave rise to the artist's old notname, the Master of the Buckingham Palace Madonna. Strozzi's sixthVirgin and Child composition, now at the Brooklyn Museum, instead shows the Virgin enthroned between four angels.

A few small-scale narrative paintings by Strozzi appear to have been independent works for domestic interiors. These include a Nativity at the Metropolitan Museum of Art, an Annunciation at the Philadelphia Museum of Art, and a God the Father Enthroned with Two Angels at the Musée Jacquemart-André, Paris.

=== Illuminations ===
As an illuminator, Strozzi was responsible with Filippo di Matteo Torelli for several choir books for the church of San Marco. These were carried out between 1446 and 1454 on the commission of Cosimo de' Medici. In 1463 he collaborated with Francesco di Antonio del Chierico on a choir-book for the Cathedral of Florence, now at the Laurentian Library (Nos. 149, 150, 151). The collaboration with Francesco took eleven years and eventually involved other workshops, including those of Cosimo Rosselli, Domenico Ghirlandaio, Attavante Attavanti and the Master of the Hamilton Xenophon. Strozzi also collaborated with Francesco Pesellino and Domenico di Michelino.

A set of nine grisaille designs in pen, wash and gouache, now housed in several museums, are probably designs for a goldsmith to follow in the sections of a reliquary or similar object.
