= Francesco Pesellino =

Italian painter (c. 1422–1457)

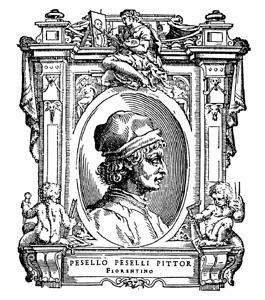
Pesellino, in the Lives of Giorgio Vasari (1588)

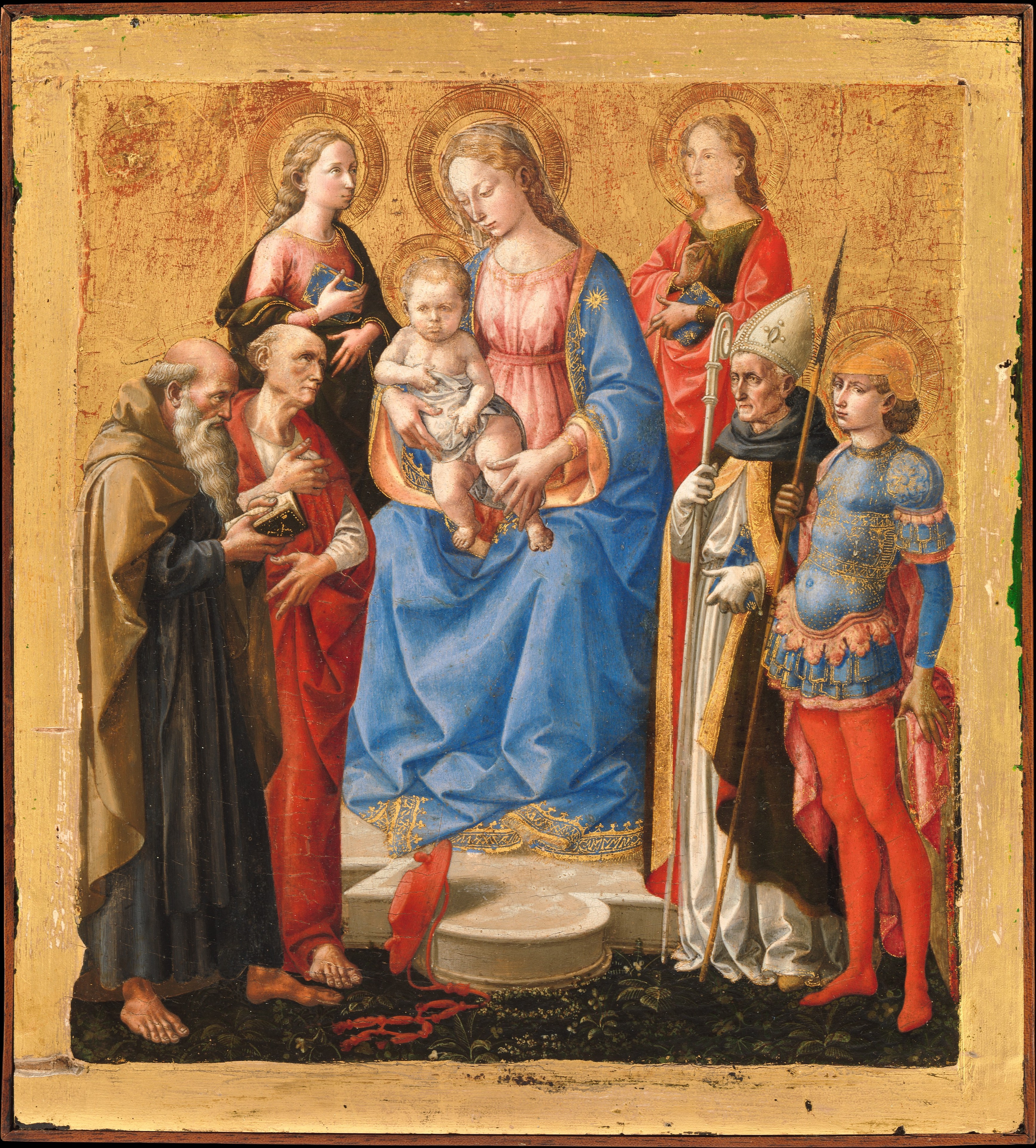
Madonna and Child with Six Saints, 1450s. New York, Metropolitan Museum of Art.

Francesco Pesellino (probably 1422 – July 29, 1457), also known as Francesco di Stefano, was an Italian Renaissance painter active in Florence. His father was the painter Stefano di Francesco (died 1427), and his maternal grandfather was the painter Giuliano Pesello (1367–1446), from whose name the diminutive nickname "Pesellino" arose. After the death of his father in 1427, the young Pesellino went to live with his grandfather whose pupil he became. Pesellino remained in his grandfather's studio until the latter's death, when he began to form working partnerships with other artists, such as Zanobi Strozzi and Fra Filippo Lippi. He married in 1442, and probably joined the Florentine painters' guild in 1447. In the following years he made for reputation with small, highly-finished works for domestic interiors, including religious panels for private devotional use and secular subjects for pieces of furniture (i.e. wedding chests and wainscoting).

Pesellino died of plague in Florence in 1457 at the age of 35. According to many art historians, his style "anticipated the developments of later Florentine painters such as Andrea del Verrocchio and the Pollaiuoli [brothers Antonio and Piero]".

== Works ==
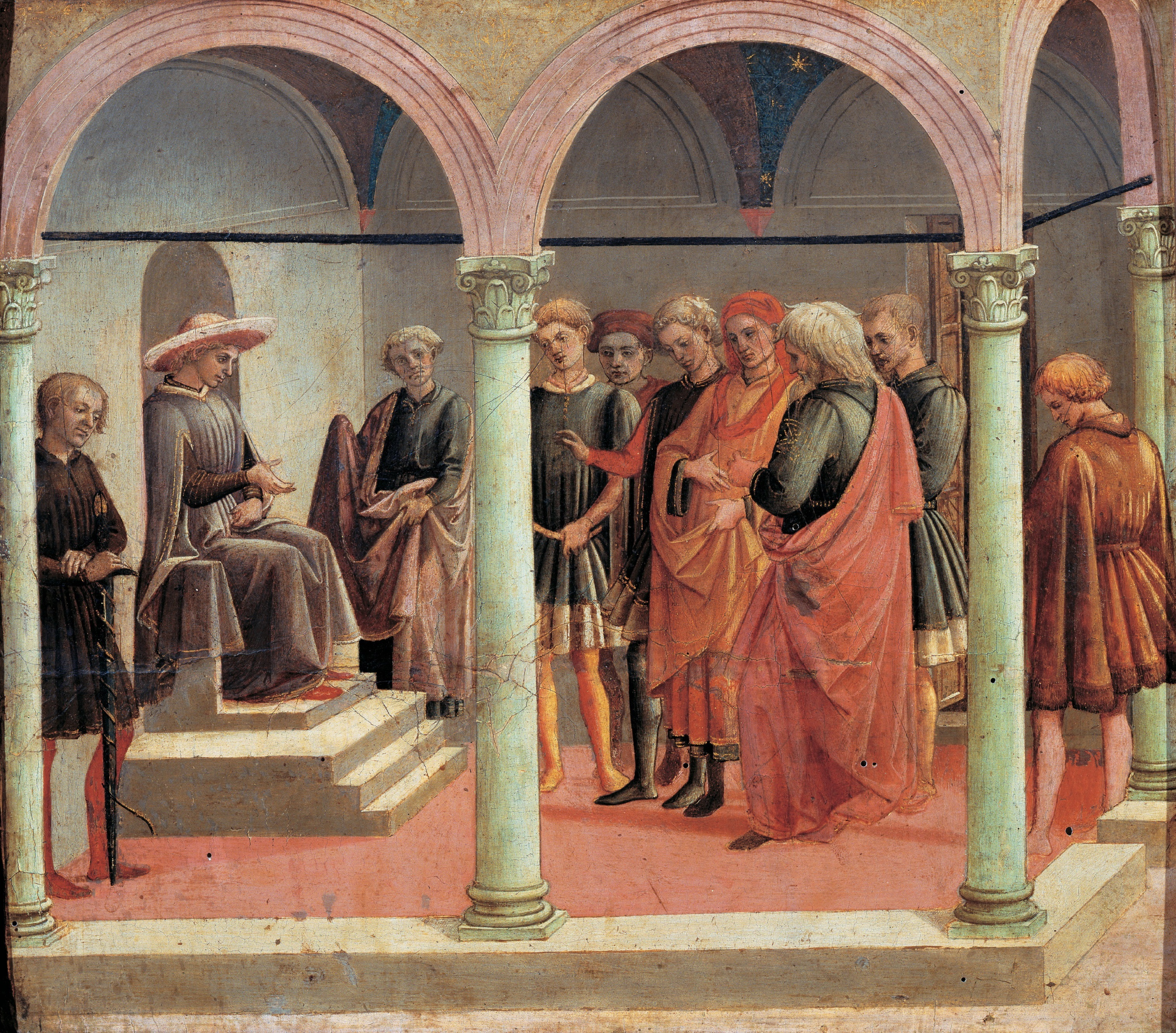
Story of Griselda (detail of a cassone panel), ca 1450. Bergamo, Accademia Carrara.

According to Vasari, Pesellino painted the predella of Fra Filippo Lippi's Novitiate Altarpiece for Santa Croce. The predella is now divided between the Uffizi and the Louvre. His only surviving documented work is the Santa Trinita of Pistoia Altarpiece. Early sources, such as Vasari's Lives of the Artists, describe a number of other paintings by Pesellino, now lost, in prominent at the Palazzo Medici and the Medici Casa Vecchia. At least one work by Pesellino is said to have hung in the same room as Paolo Uccello's Battle of San Romano.

Some panel paintings have been identified as Pesellino's by stylistic comparison with the altarpiece. These include two long horizontal panels with the Story of David and Goliath and the Triumph of David, now at the National Gallery, London. Other cassoni panels are in Bergamo (Accademia Carrara) and Boston (Isabella Stewart Gardner Museum), whilst the Metropolitan Museum of Art and Toledo Museum of Art have other works. A small diptych of the Annunciation at the Courtauld Institute is another good example of the small-scale cabinet paintings that made Pesellino's famous, whilst his King Melchior Sailing to the Holy Land is in the Clark Art Institute.

The Hermitage has six very beautiful full-page miniatures by Pesellino from an illuminated manuscript.

== See also ==
- Story of David Panels
