= Battista di Biagio Sanguigni =

Italian painter

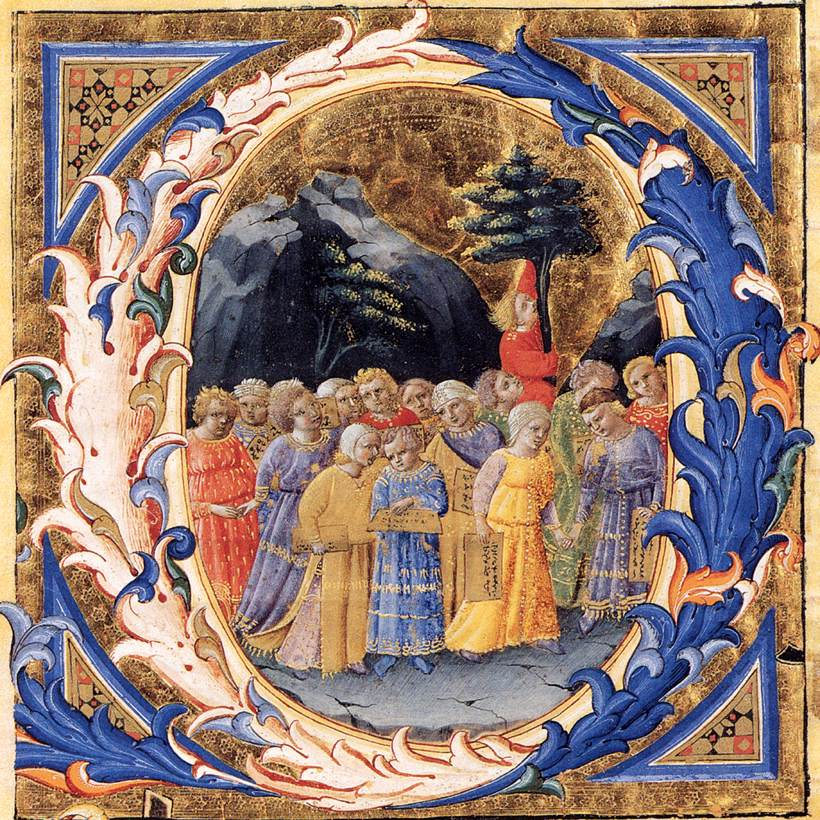
Antiphonary c1410

Battista di Biagio Sanguigni, formerly known as the Master of 1419 (active 1393–1451) was an Italian painter from the region around Florence in the first half of the 15th century.

== His work ==
The painter's work bears a good deal of resemblance to that of Lorenzo Monaco. His previous name is derived from the central panel of a now-dismantled triptych, depicting the Madonna and Child Enthroned, commissioned by Antonio di Domenico Giugni for the church of Santa Maria in Latera and now held at the Cleveland Museum of Art; the picture is dated to 1419. Previously, in about 1415, the same artist painted the two outer panels of a triptych of the Madonna and Child with Saints James the Greater and Less, John the Baptist, and Anthony Abbot, now in a Swiss collection. These paintings show a distinctly Gothic style and suggest that the artist was familiar with the work of Gherardo Starnina and Alvaro Pirez, combining some of their traits with an understanding of perspective that appears to have been derived from Masaccio.

Between 1425 and 1427 Battista painted another triptych, this one depicting Saint Julian and given to the college of San Gimignano; it shows the influence of Masolino da Panicale. The Hungarian art historian Miklós Boskovits was able to attribute an additional dozen or so works to him.

A single side of a triptych was sold recently and achieved a price of over £400,000.
