= The Tribute Money (Masaccio) =

Fresco by the Italian painter Masaccio

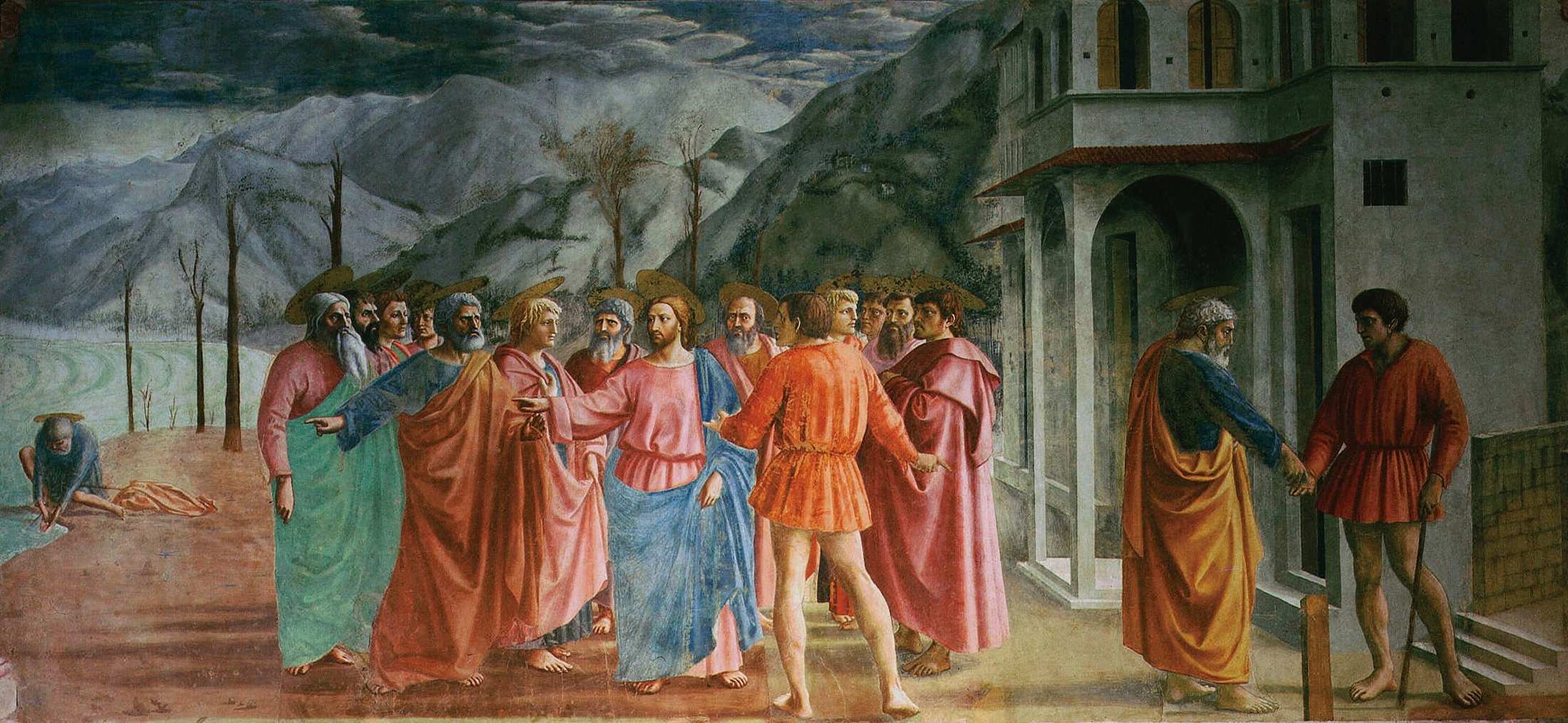
- Artist: Masaccio
- Year: c. 1425
- Type: Fresco
- Dimensions: 247 cm × 597 cm (97.2 in × 235 in)
- Location: Brancacci Chapel; Florence

The Tribute Money is a fresco by the Italian Early Renaissance painter Masaccio, located in the Brancacci Chapel of the basilica of Santa Maria del Carmine, Florence. Painted in the 1420s, it is widely considered among Masaccio's best work, and a vital part of the development of Renaissance art.

The painting is part of a cycle on the life of Saint Peter, and describes a scene from the Gospel of Matthew, in which Jesus directs Peter to find a coin in the mouth of a fish in order to pay the temple tax. Its importance relates to its revolutionary use of perspective and chiaroscuro. The Tribute Money suffered great damage in the centuries after its creation, until the chapel went through a thorough restoration in the 1980s.

== The Brancacci Chapel ==
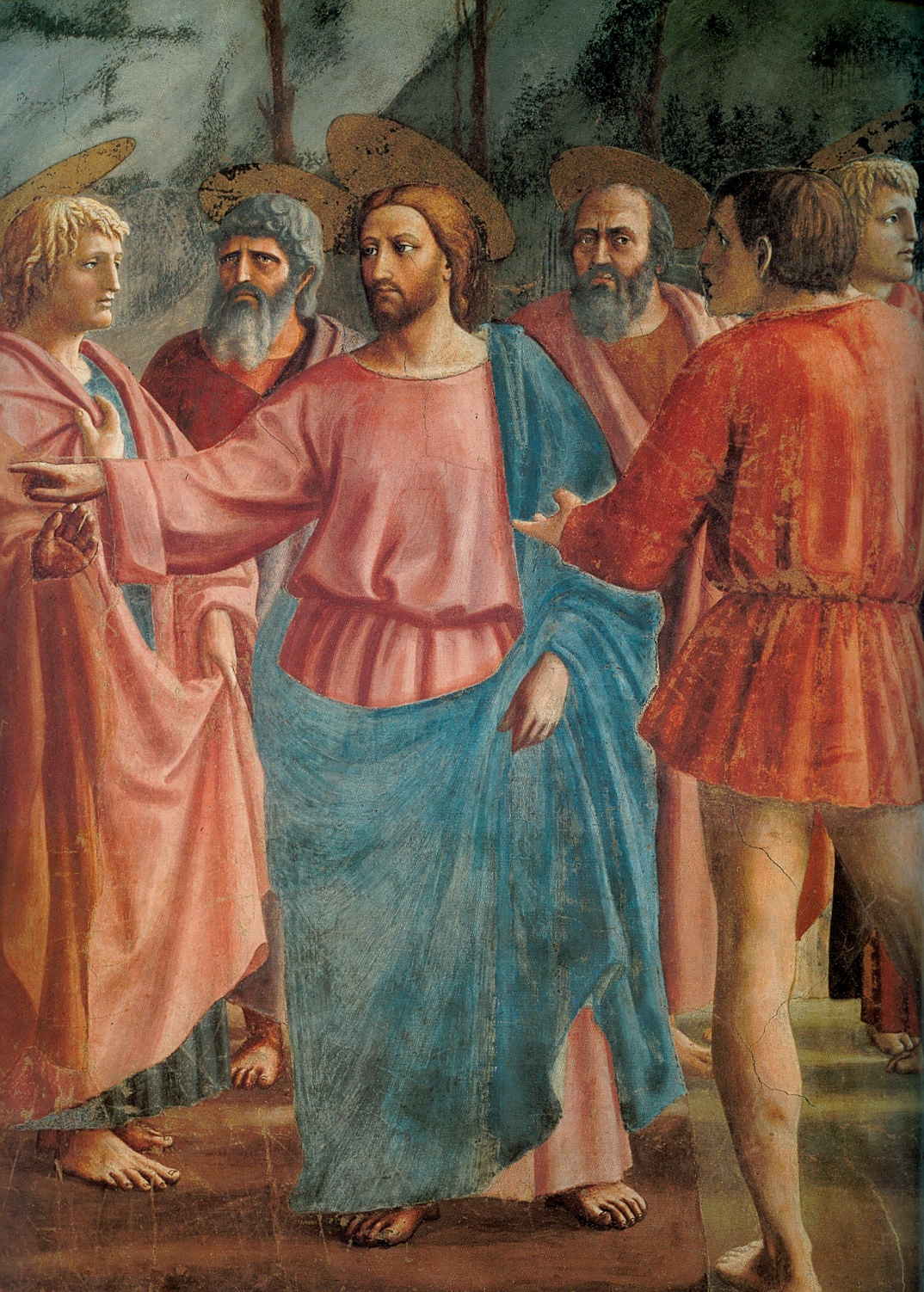
Christ with disciples in the painting.

The Brancacci Chapel, in the basilica of Santa Maria del Carmine, was founded around 1366/7 by Pietro Brancacci. The chapel passed to Pietro's nephew, Felice Brancacci, who some time between 1423 and 1425 commissioned the painter Masolino to decorate the walls with a series of frescoes from the life of Saint Peter. Peter was the name-saint of the founder, and the patron saint of the Brancacci family, but the choice also reflected support for the Roman papacy during the Great Schism.

At some point Masolino was joined by another artist, the eighteen years younger Masaccio. Masolino eventually left, either for Hungary in 1425 or for Rome in 1427, leaving the completion of the chapel to Masaccio. In 1427 or 28, before the chapel was completed, Masaccio joined Masolino in Rome. Only in the 1480s were the frescos in the chapel finished, by Filippino Lippi. The Tribute Money, though, is considered Masaccio's work entirely.

Over the centuries the frescoes were greatly altered and damaged. In 1746 the upper levels were painted over by the artist Vincenzo Meucci, covering up most of Masolino's work. Then, in 1771, the church was ruined by fire. The Brancacci Chapel, though structurally undamaged by the fire, suffered great damages to its frescoes. It was not until the years 1981–1990 that a full-scale restoration of the chapel was undertaken, restoring the frescoes to approximately their original state. The paintings had suffered some irreparable damage though, particularly the parts that were painted a secco: in The Tribute Money, the leaves on the trees were gone, while Christ's robe had lost much of its original azure brilliance.

== Subject matter ==
The scene depicted in The Tribute Money is drawn from Matthew 17:24–27:

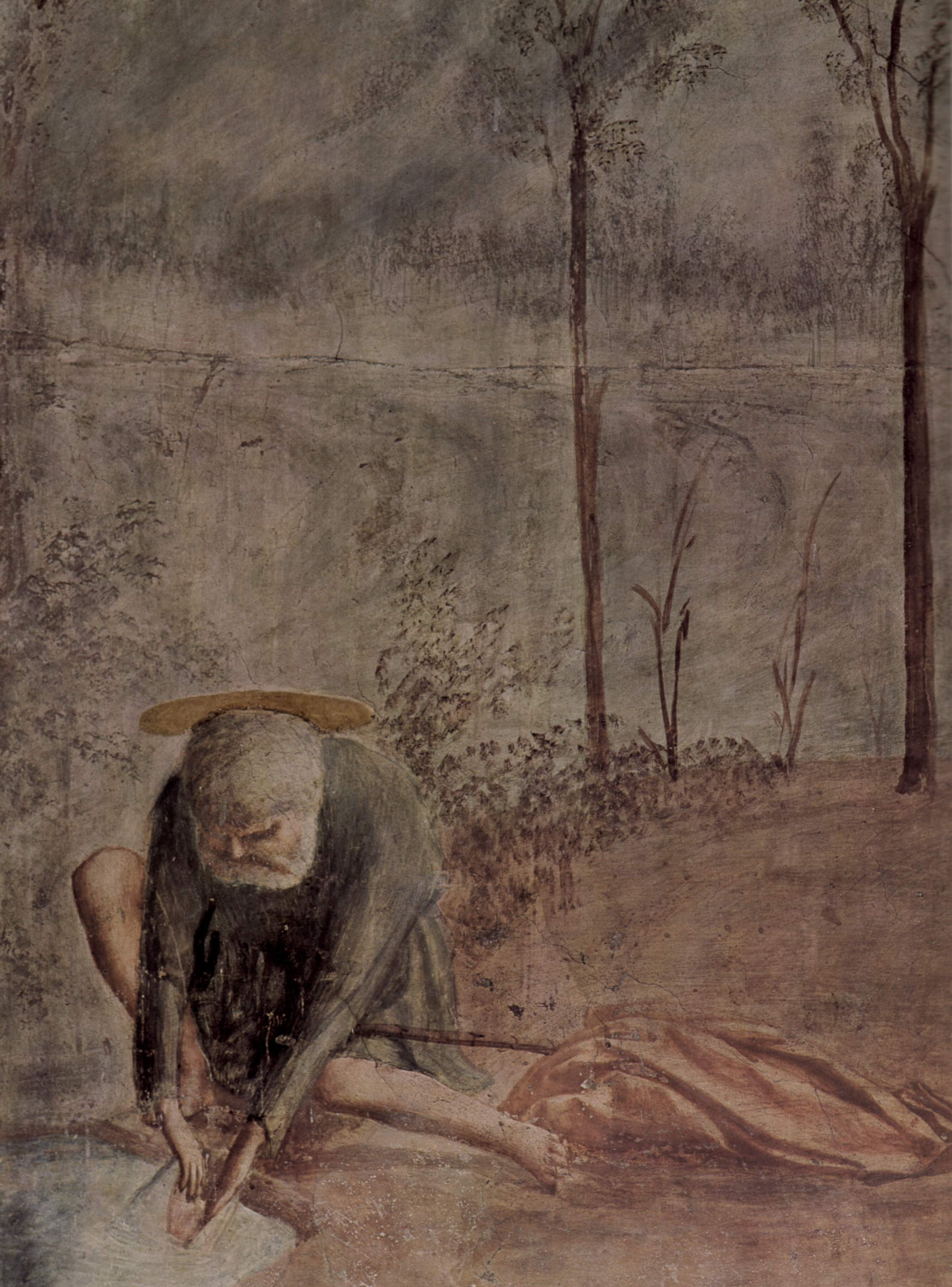
Peter removing money from a fish's mouth

24. And when they were come to Capernaum, they that received tribute money came to Peter, and said, Doth not your master pay tribute? 25. He saith, Yes. And when he was come into the house, Jesus prevented him, saying, What thinkest thou, Simon? of whom do the kings of the earth take custom or tribute? of their own children, or of strangers? 26. Peter saith unto him, Of strangers. Jesus saith unto him, Then are the children free. 27. Notwithstanding, lest we should offend them, go thou to the sea, and cast an hook, and take up the fish that first cometh up; and when thou hast opened his mouth, thou shalt find a piece of money: that take, and give unto them for me and thee.

— Matthew 17:24–27

The story is only found in the Gospel of Matthew, which according to Christian tradition was written by the apostle Matthew, himself a tax collector according to Matthew 9:9–13. The passage has been used as a Christian justification for the legitimacy of secular authority, and is often seen in conjunction with another passage, the "render unto Caesar..." story. In Matthew 22:15–22, a group of Pharisees try to trick Christ into incriminating himself, by asking if it is "lawful to give tribute unto Caesar, or not." Pointing out Caesar's image on the coin, he replies "Render therefore unto Caesar the things which are Caesar's; and unto God the things that are God's."

== Composition ==
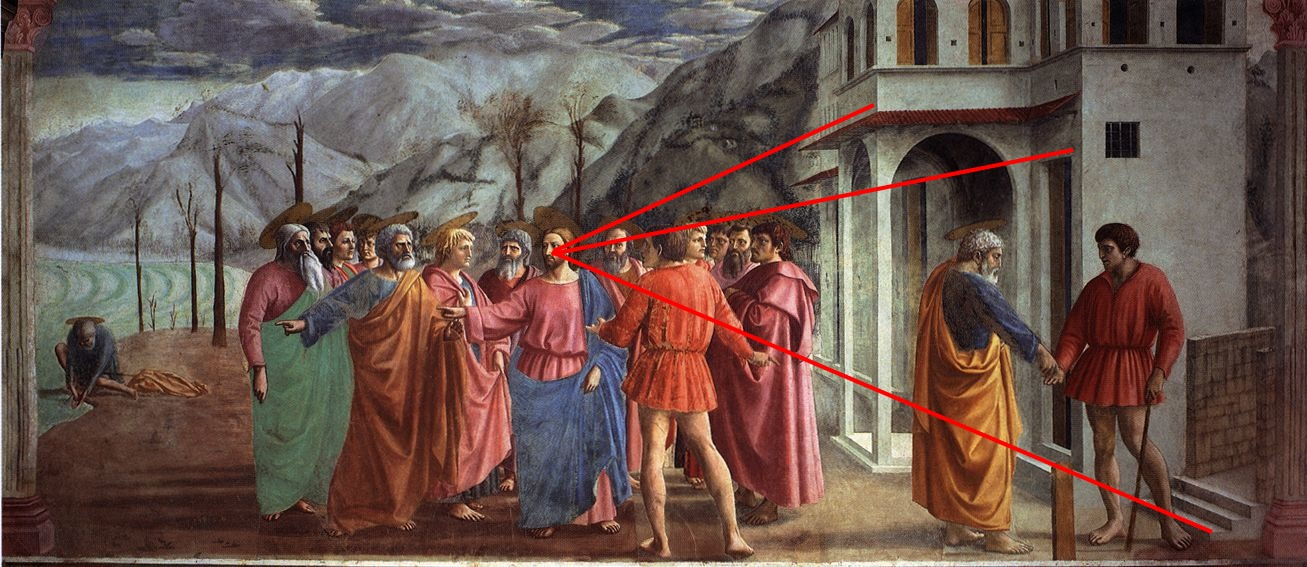
Painting with drawn-in lines showing how the single-point perspective converges on the head of Christ.

The painting diverges somewhat from the biblical story, in that the tax collector confronts the whole group of Christ and the disciples, and the entire scene takes place outdoors. The story is told in three parts that do not occur sequentially, but the narrative logic is still maintained, through compositional devices. The central scene is that of the tax collector demanding the tribute. The head of Christ is the vanishing point of the painting, drawing the eyes of the spectator there. Both Christ and Peter then point to the left hand part of the painting, where the next scene takes place in the middle background: Peter taking the money out of the mouth of the fish. The final scene – where Peter pays the tax collector – is at the right, set apart by the framework of an architectural structure.

This work is among the first paintings to utilize a vanishing point, in the new system of single-point perspective, in this case converging on Christ's head. Also, it is one of the first paintings that does away with the use of a head-cluster. A technique employed by earlier Proto-Renaissance artists, such as Giotto or Duccio. If you were to walk into the painting, you could walk around Jesus Christ, in the semicircle created, and back out the painting again with ease.

Christ and the disciples are placed in a semicircle, reflecting the shape of the chapel's apse. The tax collector, on the other hand, stands outside the holy space. While the group of holy men are dressed almost entirely in robes of pastel pink and blue, the official wears a shorter tunic of a striking vermilion. The colour adds to the impertinence expressed through his gestures. Another way contrast is achieved is in the way – both in the central scene and on the right – the tax collector's postures are copying almost exactly those of Peter, only seen from the opposite angle. This gives a three-dimensional quality to the figures, allowing the spectator to view them from all sides.

== Style ==
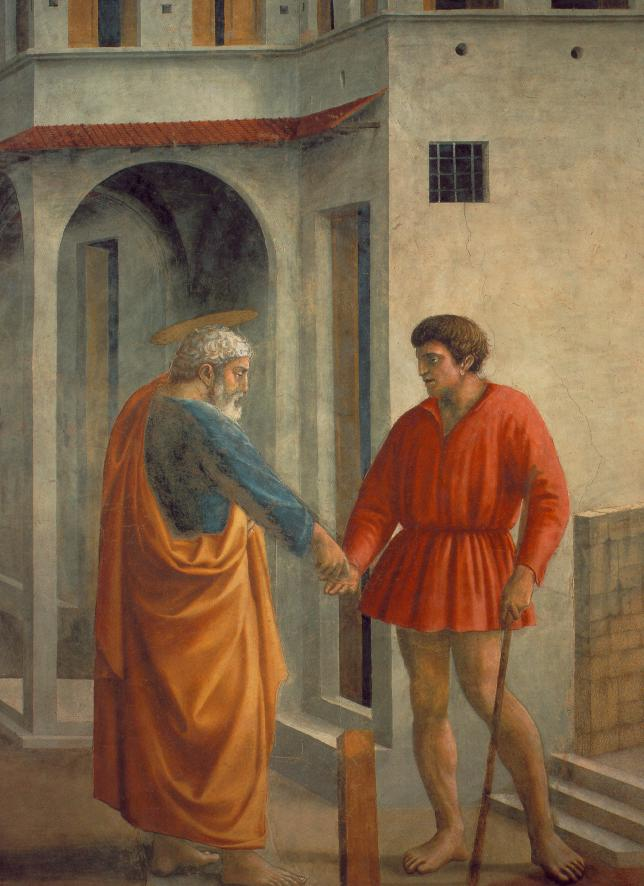
Peter with the tax collector

Masaccio is often compared to contemporaries like Donatello and Brunelleschi as a pioneer of the renaissance, particularly for his use of single-point perspective. One technique that was unique to Masaccio, however, was the use of atmospheric, or aerial perspective. Both the mountains in the background, and the figure of Peter on the left are dimmer and paler than the objects in the foreground, creating an illusion of depth. This technique was known in ancient Rome, but was considered lost until reinvented by Masaccio.

Masaccio's use of light was also revolutionary. While earlier artists like Giotto had applied a flat, neutral light from an unidentifiable source, Masaccio's light emanated from a specific location outside the picture, casting the figures in light and shadow. This created a chiaroscuro effect, sculpting the bodies into three-dimensional shapes.

Masaccio is often justly praised for the variety of his facial depictions. In the case of this painting the accolade is somewhat diminished, however, by the fact that the work was unfinished at the time of his death, and the heads of Jesus and St Peter were painted by his senior collaborator Masolino da Panicale, (who painted the corresponding perspective work on the other side of the chapel, Healing of the Cripple and Raising of Tabitha.

== Interpretations ==
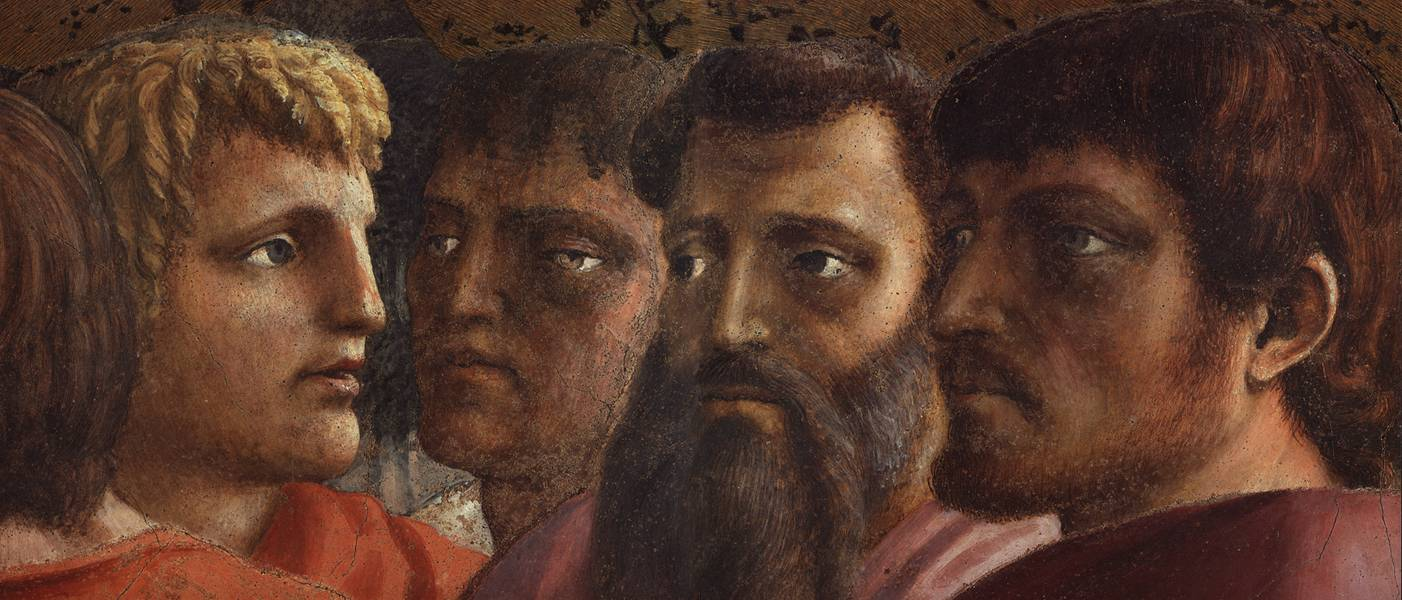
Detail from the painting showing the use of chiaroscuro. The heads are possibly those of Judas (2nd from left) and Masaccio himself as Thomas (right).

Several theories have been proposed as to why this specific subject – not a very common theme in art history – was chosen. One suggestion sees the painting as a justification for the so-called catasto of 1427; a new form of income tax. This is not a very likely explanation, however, as Brancacci would stand to lose from the new taxation, and would probably rather have been among its opponents. A more probable explanation links the painting to Pope Martin V's 1423 agreement that the Florentine church be subjected to state tax. The money found in the fish's mouth can also be seen as an expression of how Florence's wealth came from the sea. Felice Brancacci, a silk merchant involved in Mediterranean trade, was also a member of the city's Board of Maritime Consuls.

Central to an understanding of the painting, as well as the entire series, is the relationship the Brancaccis and the city of Florence had with the papacy in Rome. Florence was at the time at war with Milan, and needed the support of the Pope. The Brancacci frescos must therefore be seen in the context of a pro-papal policy, and as an attempt to legitimise the Roman see through its association with Saint Peter – the first bishop of Rome, and first pope.

External videos
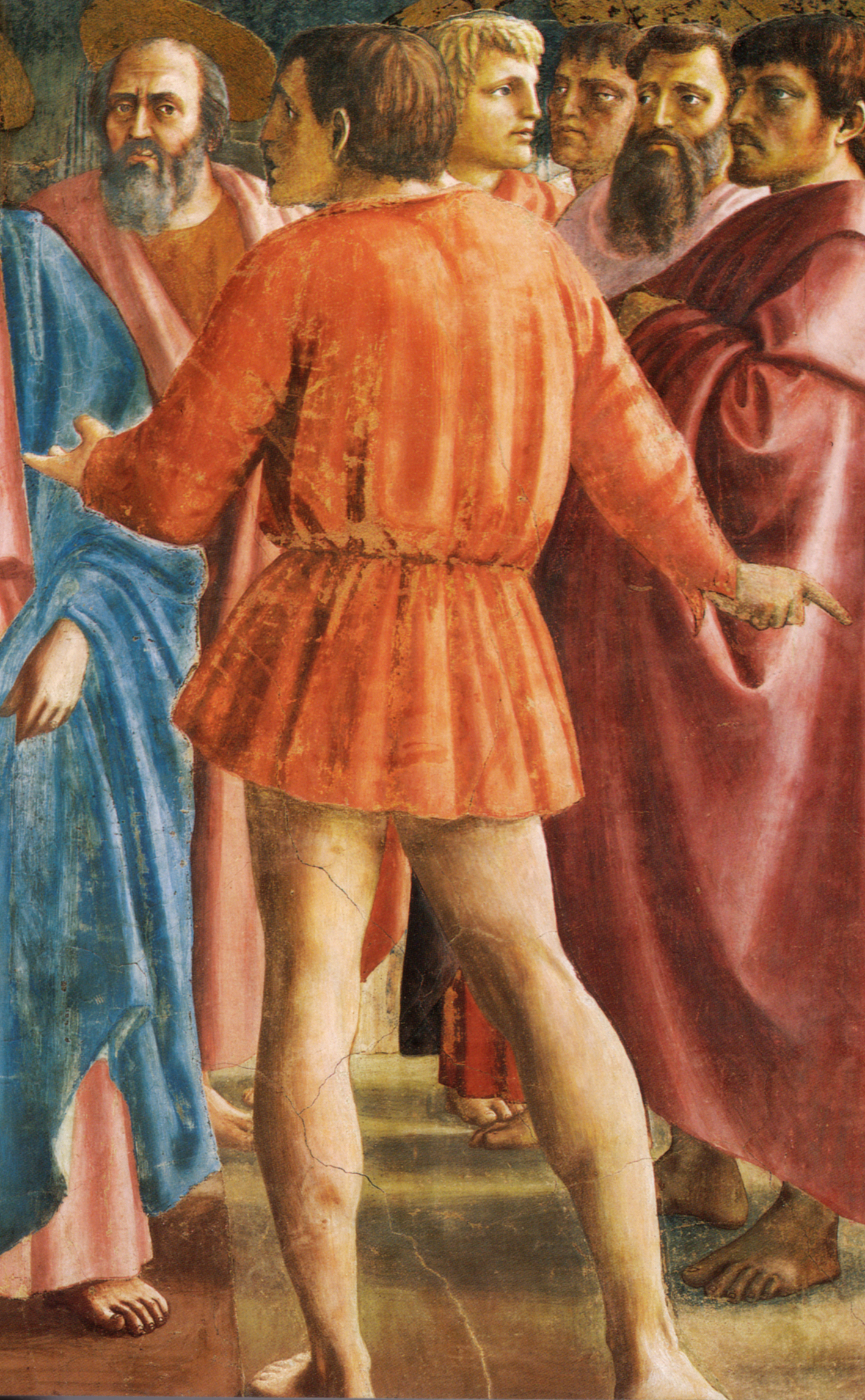
- Masaccio's The Tribute Money in the Brancacci Chapel, Smarthistory
- The Tribute Money

In the story, Peter is clearly singled out among the disciples, and his strong connection with Christ can be seen in Christ's words "for me and thee". Peter appears a majestic and energetic figure when he is with Christ and when he performs his work, in contrast to the diminutive shape on the left. This all points forward to his apostolic role as Christ's vicar on earth. As such The Tribute Money represents a transitional scene in the chapel; in doing Christ's bidding Peter goes from being a disciple to being the master.

Only two of the disciples can be identified with any degree of certainty: Peter with his iconographic grey hair and beard, and blue and yellow attire, and John; the young beardless man standing next to Christ. John's head is reminiscent of Roman sculptures, and it is reflected in the very similar face of another disciple on the right. The person next to this disciple is assumed to be Judas, whose dark and sinister face mirrors that of the tax collector. It has been speculated – first by Vasari – that the face on the far right is a self-portrait of Masaccio himself, as Thomas.

== See also ==
- List of major paintings by Masaccio
- The Last Supper (Leonardo)
- The Tribute Money (Titian)
- 100 Great Paintings, 1980 BBC series

== Sources ==
- Adams, Laurie (2001). Italian Renaissance Art. Oxford: Westview Press. ISBN 0-8133-3690-2.
- Baldini, U. & O. Casazza (1992). The Brancacci Chapel Frescoes. London: Thames and Hudson. ISBN 0-8109-3120-6.
- Gardner, Helen (1991). Gardner's Art Through the Ages (9th ed.). San Diego: Harcourt Brace Jovanovich. ISBN 0-15-503769-2.
- Ladis, Andrew (1993). The Brancacci Chapel, Florence. New York: George Braziller. ISBN 0-8076-1311-8.
- Paoletti, John T. & Gary M. Radke (1997). Art in Renaissance Italy. London: L. King. ISBN 1-85669-094-6.
- Shulman, Ken (1991). Anatomy of a Restoration: The Brancacci Chapel. New York: Walker. ISBN 0-8027-1121-9.
- Watkins, Law Bradley (1980). The Brancacci Chapel Frescoes: Meaning and Use. Ann Arbor: University Microfilms International.
