= Bolchi =

Bolchi is an Italian surname. Notable people with the surname include:

- Bruno Bolchi (1940–2022), Italian footballer and manager
- Sandro Bolchi (1924–2005), Italian director, actor, and journalist

== See also ==
- Bocchi
