= Felice Brancacci =

Felice di Michele Brancacci (born 1382 - fl. 15th century) was a Florentine silk merchant, best known for commissioning the decoration of the Brancacci Chapel. The nephew and heir of Piero di Piuvichese Brancacci, he was involved in Mediterranean silk trade, and also acted as a diplomat.

== Biography ==
Felice is known to have won a joust held to celebrate Florence's submission of Pisa in 1406. He acted as a diplomat for the Florentine Republic, and visited the court of the Sultan of Egypt in 1422. He was also a member of the city's Board of Maritime Consuls. As a result of the decline in the wool trade, Brancacci's wealth as a silk merchant increased rapidly. In May 1431 he married Lena, daughter of Palla Strozzi, a union that put him at the centre of Florentine politics. In 1433, a number of the most powerful families of the city – including the Strozzis – had driven the family of Cosimo de Medici into exile. When the Medicis returned in triumph the next year, Brancacci was among those expelled as an enemy of the Republic, in spite of his attempts to stay out of active political ploys.

== The Brancacci Chapel ==
Sometime after 1423 and before 1425 Brancacci supposedly commissioned the painter Masaccio to decorate the walls of the Brancacci chapel left by his uncle. The subject was the life of Saint Peter, the name-saint of the founder, and the patron saint of the Brancacci family. The choice also reflected support for the Roman papacy during the Great Schism. Masolino was later joined by the younger artist Tommaso Cassai, or Masaccio. Masaccio's contributions to the frescoes – including The Tribute Money – are considered the most important, and central to the development of renaissance art. Both artists left before the work was completed, however, in 1427 or 28. It was not until the 1480s, when the Brancaccis were allowed to return from exile, that the work was finished, by Filippino Lippi.
