= Bocci (surname) =

Bocci is an Italian surname. Notable people with the surname include:

- Anelio Bocci (born 1953), Italian retired male long-distance runner
- Beatrice Bocci (born 1970), Italian showgirl, beauty pageant winner and television presenter
- Cesare Bocci (born 1957), Italian actor
- Eraldo Bocci (born 1942), Italian retired racing cyclist
- Gildo Bocci (1886–1964), Italian film actor
- Marco Bocci (pseudonym of Marco Bocciolini; born 1978), Italian actor

== See also ==
- Bocci, Canadian design and manufacturing company
- Bocchi
