= Expulsion from the Garden of Eden =

1425 fresco by Masaccio

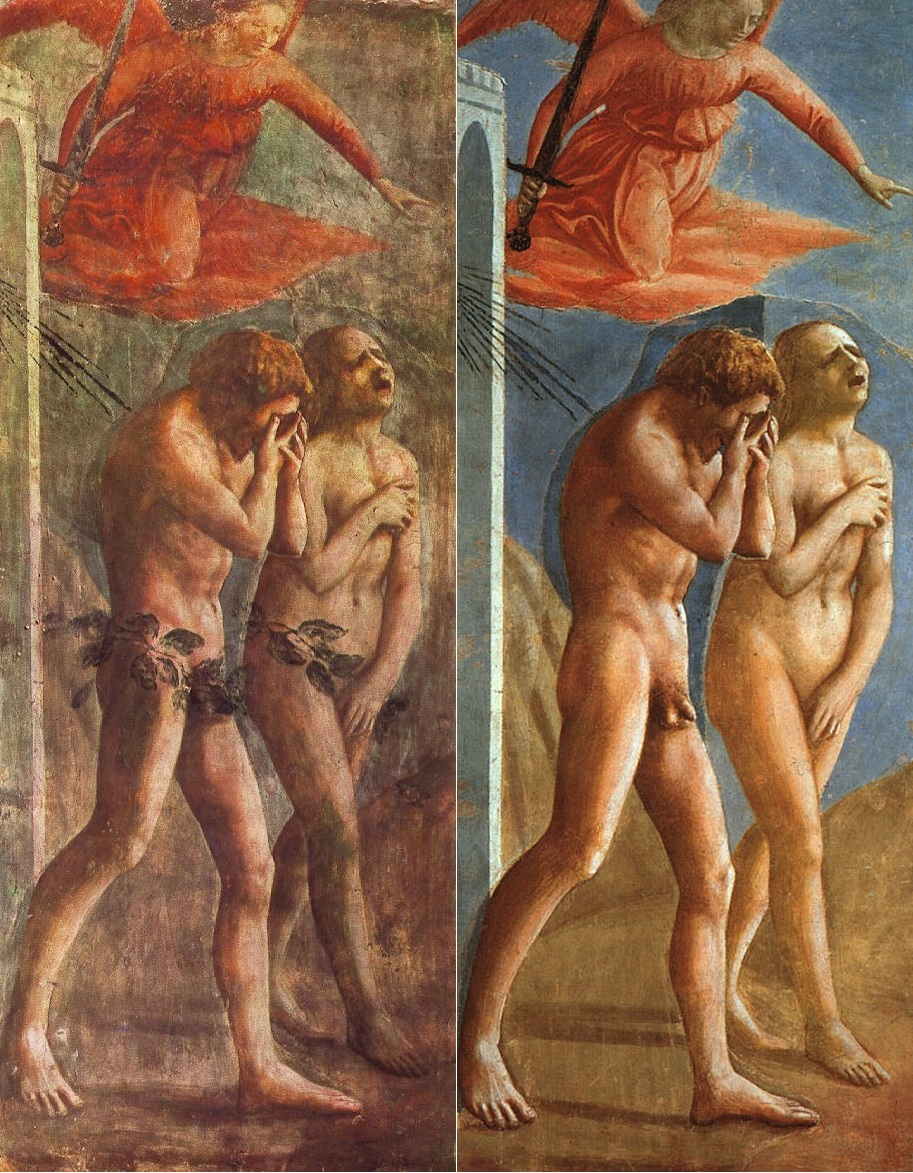
The Expulsion from the Garden of Eden, before and after restoration.

The Expulsion from the Garden of Eden (Italian: Cacciata dei progenitori dall'Eden) is a fresco by the Italian Early Renaissance artist Masaccio. The fresco is a single scene from the cycle painted around 1425 by Masaccio, Masolino and others on the walls of the Brancacci Chapel in the church of Santa Maria del Carmine in Florence. It depicts the expulsion of Adam and Eve from the garden of Eden, from the biblical Book of Genesis chapter 3, albeit with a few differences from the canonical account.

== Possible sources of inspiration ==
Many possible sources of inspiration have been pointed out that Masaccio may have drawn from. For Adam, possible references include numerous sculptures of Marsyas (from Greek Mythology) and a crucifix done by Donatello.

For Eve, art analysts usually point to different versions of Venus Pudica, such as Prudence by Giovanni Pisano.

== Cover up and restoration ==
External videos
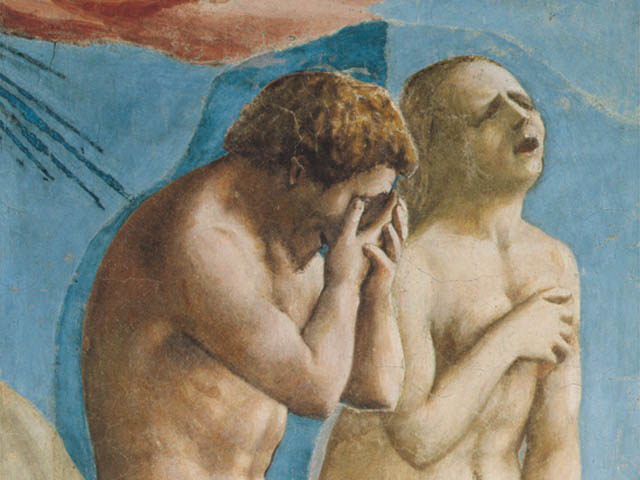
- Masaccio's Expulsion of Adam and Eve from Eden, Smarthistory

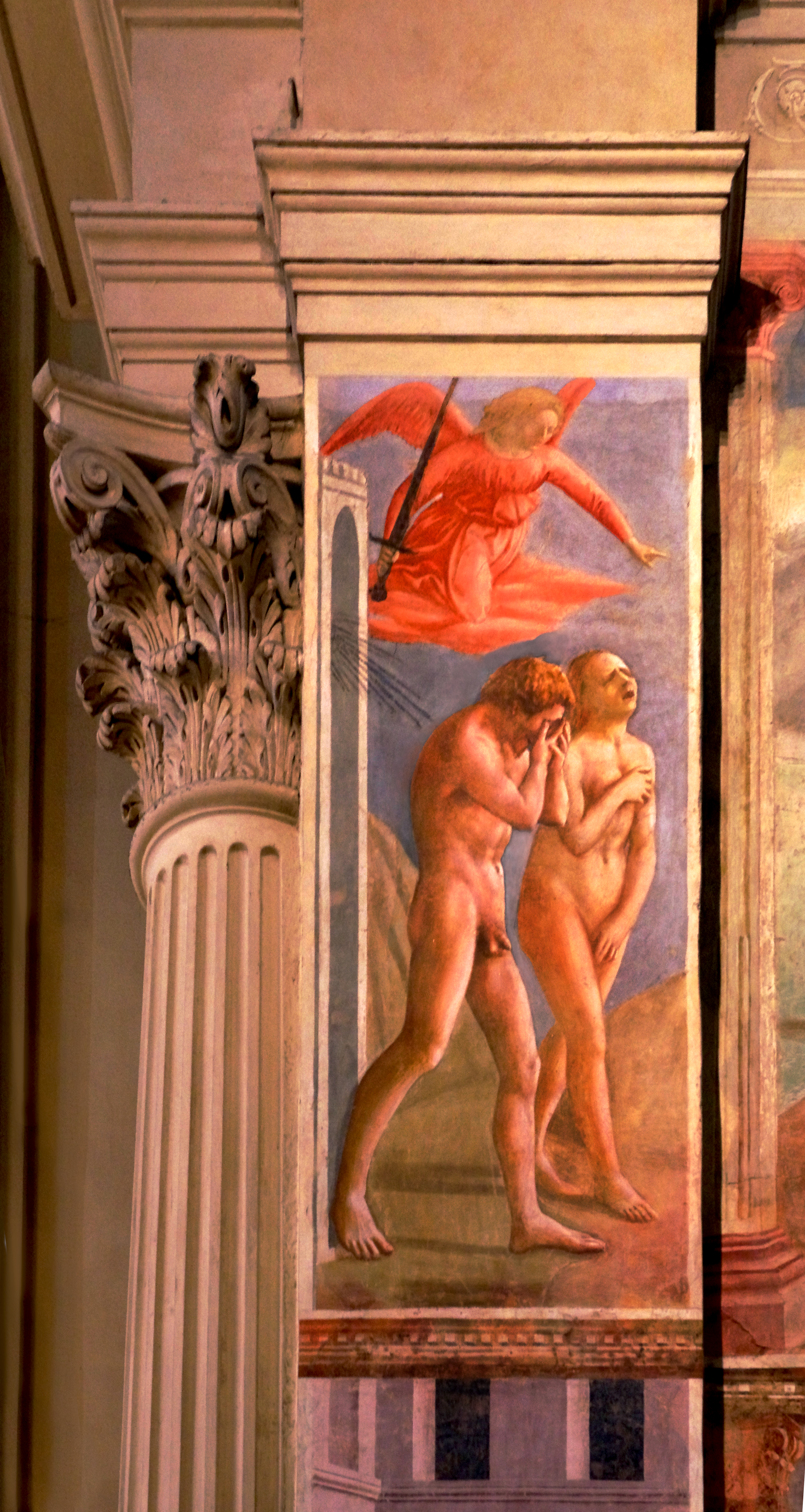
The scene in its context in the chapel.

Three centuries after the fresco was painted, Cosimo III de' Medici, in line with contemporary ideas of decorum, demanded that fig leaves be painted over to conceal the genitals of the figures. These were later removed in the 1980s when the painting was fully restored and cleaned.

== Influence on Michelangelo ==
Masaccio's work shaped the tastes of later Renaissance artists. Perhaps the most famous of these was Michelangelo, whose teacher, Domenico Ghirlandaio, was a great admirer of Masaccio's religious scenes and designs. The influence on Michelangelo is most visible in his depiction of The Fall of Man and the Expulsion from the Garden of Eden on the ceiling of the Sistine Chapel.

== Differences from Genesis ==
The main points in this painting that deviate from the account as it appears in Genesis:

1. Adam and Eve are shown in the nude. Although this increases the drama of the scene, it differs from Genesis 3:21 (KJV) which states, "Unto Adam also and to his wife did the LORD God make coats of skins, and clothed them."
2. Only one Cherub angel is present. Genesis 3:24 states, "So he drove out the man; and he placed at the east of the garden of Eden Cherubims, [...]" (-im being the original Hebrew plural ending of Cherub, doubled with an English plural in this version).
3. The arch depicted at the garden entrance does not appear in the Biblical account.

However, since artists often followed the studio tradition, painting from previous versions of a scene--and so learning from and absorbing other artists' expressive inventions into their own work--any responsible iconographic study would founder in the shallows of literal expectation if the painting were only judged by its adherence to these details and therefore seen to be successful only if it functioned as a simple illustration for the scene.

Masaccio's evocation of Eve's howling, deeply felt pain in particular explores the meaning of the expulsion on a previously unexamined, more personal level.

In 2nd Temple Jewish texts, however, Adam is described as glorious (Sirach 49, &c.), and in both some Rabbinic and Christian Patristic sources, there is a long tradition of reading the Hebrew word for "skin" as "light" (there is only one slight difference in the vowels between the two words), and taking the Genesis 3:21 words about God clothing the pair in the Pluperfect sense, such as Sebastian Brock has shown is done in the Syriac tradition. In Rabbinic sources there are several times when Adam is compared and contrasted with Moses, particularly in terms of Moses' luminosity after ascending the mountain, and at least one text where Moses claims that his glory is greater than Adam's, because he did not lose his glory (Deuteronomy Rabbah 11:3); Genesis Rabbah 20:12 notes that Rabbi Meir had a scroll that had "light" instead of skin. The same tradition is found in Ephrem the Syrian, who, in his Hymns on Paradise 6, talks about Christ clothing the faithful in the robe that Adam lost with the transgression. The Canon of St. Andrew of Crete has the cantor liken himself to Adam, and say "I have found myself stripped naked of God". Bede, in his commentary On Genesis, has similar comments: "having lost the glory of innocence by their transgression, they claimed for themselves the garment of an excuse". The "stripped of divinity/glory/innocence/honor motif is thus found in the Latin, Greek, and Syriac traditions of the Church. It seems quite possible that these artists were working within this very old tradition that stretches across traditions.

== See also ==
- List of major paintings by Masaccio
- Fall of man
