= Brancacci Chapel =

Chapel in Florence, Italy

Coordinates: 43°46′3.80″N 11°14′36.87″E

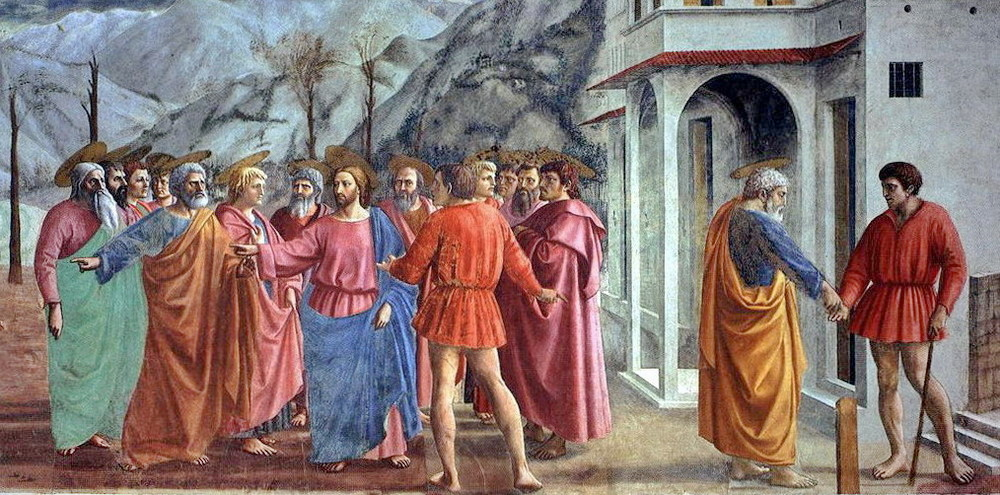
The Tribute Money, fresco by Masaccio in the Brancacci Chapel.

The Brancacci Chapel (in Italian, "Cappella dei Brancacci") is a chapel in the Church of Santa Maria del Carmine in Florence, central Italy. It is sometimes called the "Sistine Chapel of the early Renaissance" for its painting cycle, among the most famous and influential of the period. Construction of the chapel was commissioned by Felice Brancacci and began in 1422. The paintings were executed over the years 1425 to 1427. Public access is currently gained via the neighbouring convent, designed by Brunelleschi.

The patron of the pictorial decoration was Felice Brancacci, descendant of Pietro, who had served as the Florentine ambassador to Cairo until 1423. Upon his return to Florence, he hired Masolino da Panicale to paint his chapel. Masolino's associate, 21-year-old Masaccio, 18 years younger than Masolino, assisted, but during painting Masolino left to Hungary, where he was painter to the king, and the commission was given to Masaccio. By the time Masolino returned he was learning from his talented former student. However, Masaccio was called to Rome before he could finish the chapel, and died in Rome at the age of 27. Portions of the chapel were completed later by Filippino Lippi. During the Baroque period some of the paintings were seen as unfashionable and a tomb was placed in front of them.

== The paintings ==
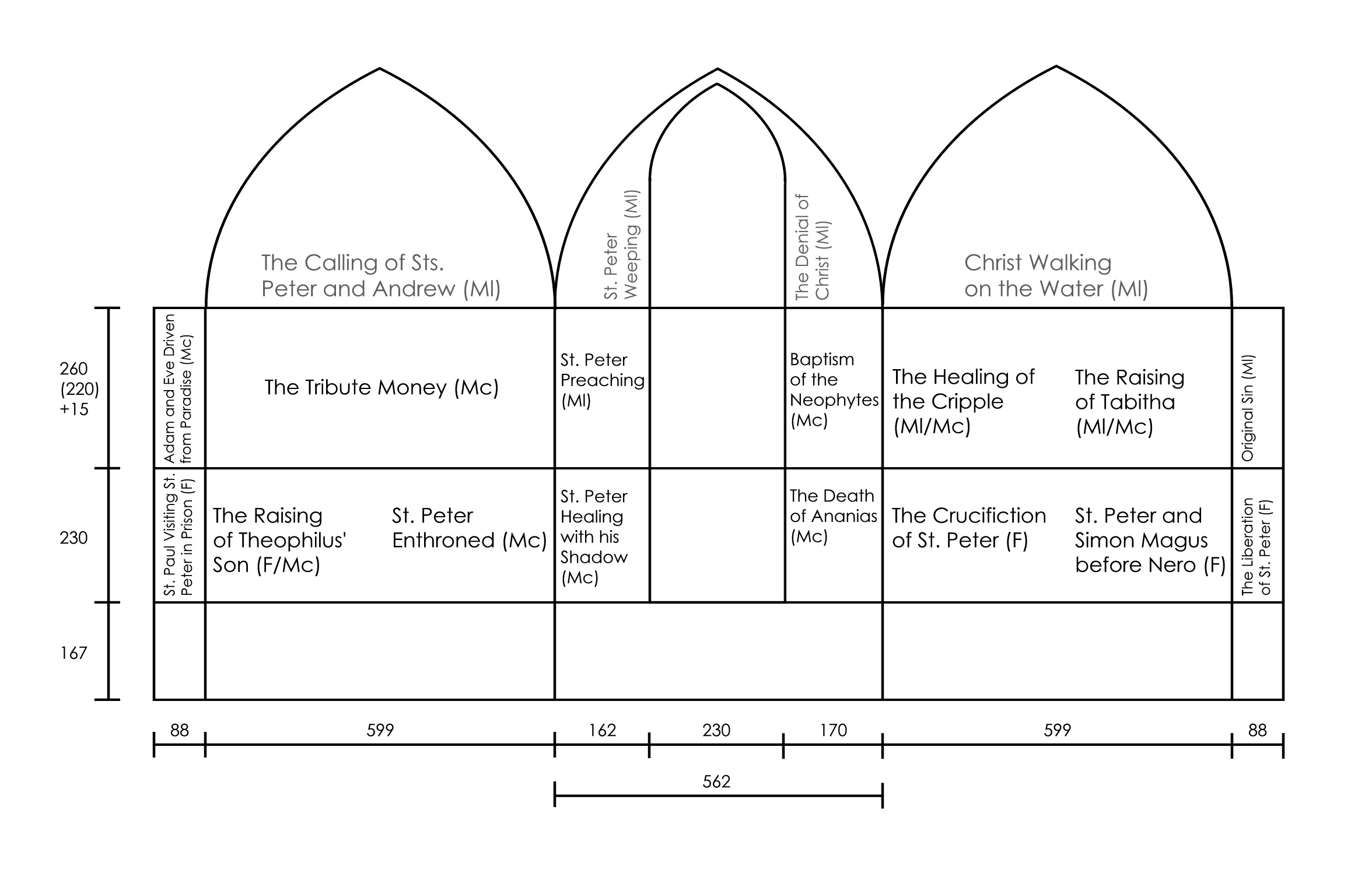
Schematics of the Brancacci Chapel paintings.

In his frescos, Masaccio carries out a radical break from the medieval pictorial tradition, by adhering to the new Renaissance perspectival conception of space. Thus, perspective and light create deep spaces where volumetrically constructed figures move in a strongly individualised human dimension. Masaccio therefore continues on Giotto's path, detaching himself from a symbolic vision of man and propounding a greater realistic painting. The cycle from the life of Saint Peter was commissioned as patron saint from Pietro Brancacci, the original owner of the chapel.

The paintings are explained below in their narrative order.

=== The Temptation of Adam and Eve ===
By Masolino da Panicale.

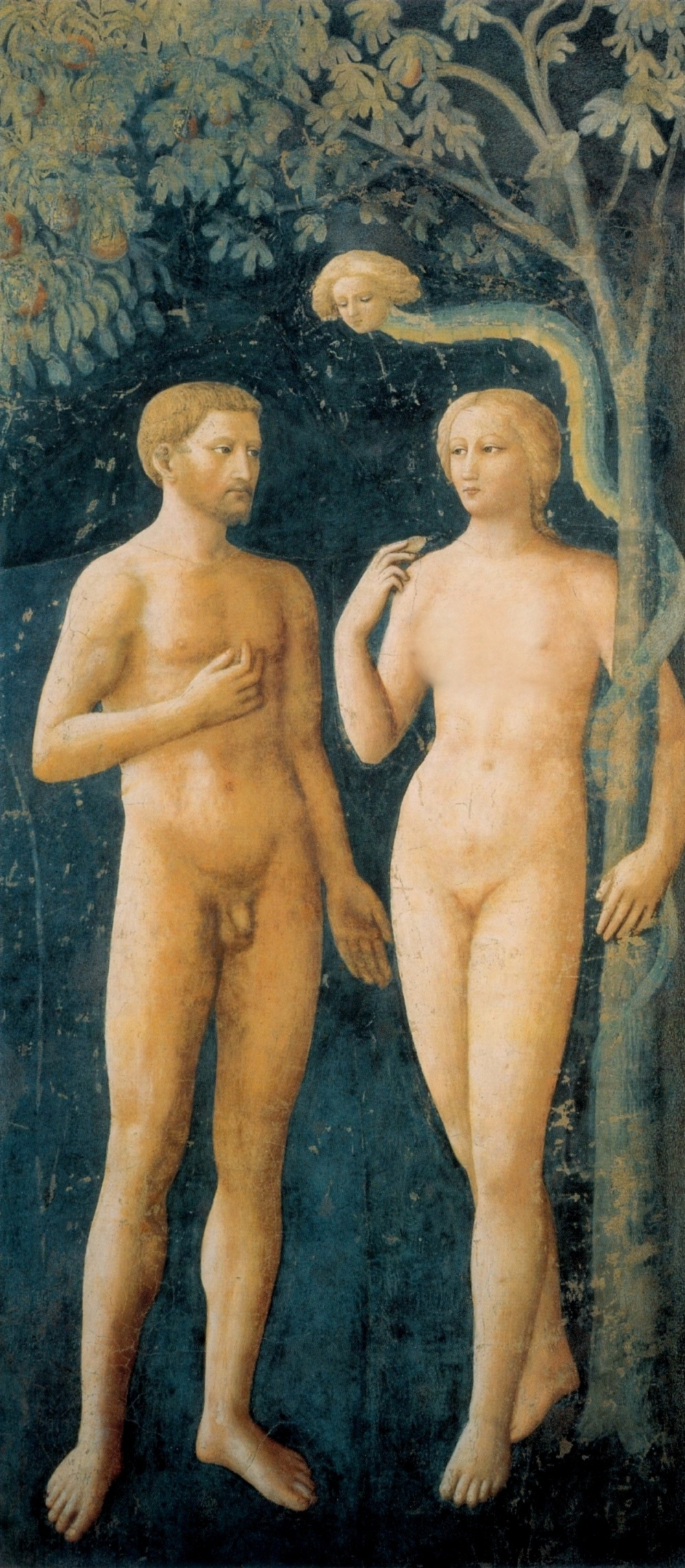
The Temptation of Adam and Eve, by Masolino da Panicale.

In contrast with Masaccio's Expulsion, this is a serene and innocent raffiguration.

The cycle begins with this painting by Masolino, placed on the higher rectangle of the arch delimiting the Chapel, within the pillar thickness. This scene and the opposite one (the Expulsion) are the premises to the story narrated in the frescos, showing the moment in which humans severed their union with God, later reconciled by Christ with Peter's mediation.

The painting shows Adam standing near Eve: they look at each other with measured postures, as she prepares to bite on the apple, just offered to her by the serpent near her arm around the tree. The snake has a head with thick blond hair, much idealised. The scene is aulic in its presentation, with gestures and style conveying tones of late International Gothic. Light, which models the figures without sharp angles, is soft and embracing; the dark background makes the body stand out in their sensual plasticity, almost suspended in space.

=== The Expulsion from the Garden of Eden ===
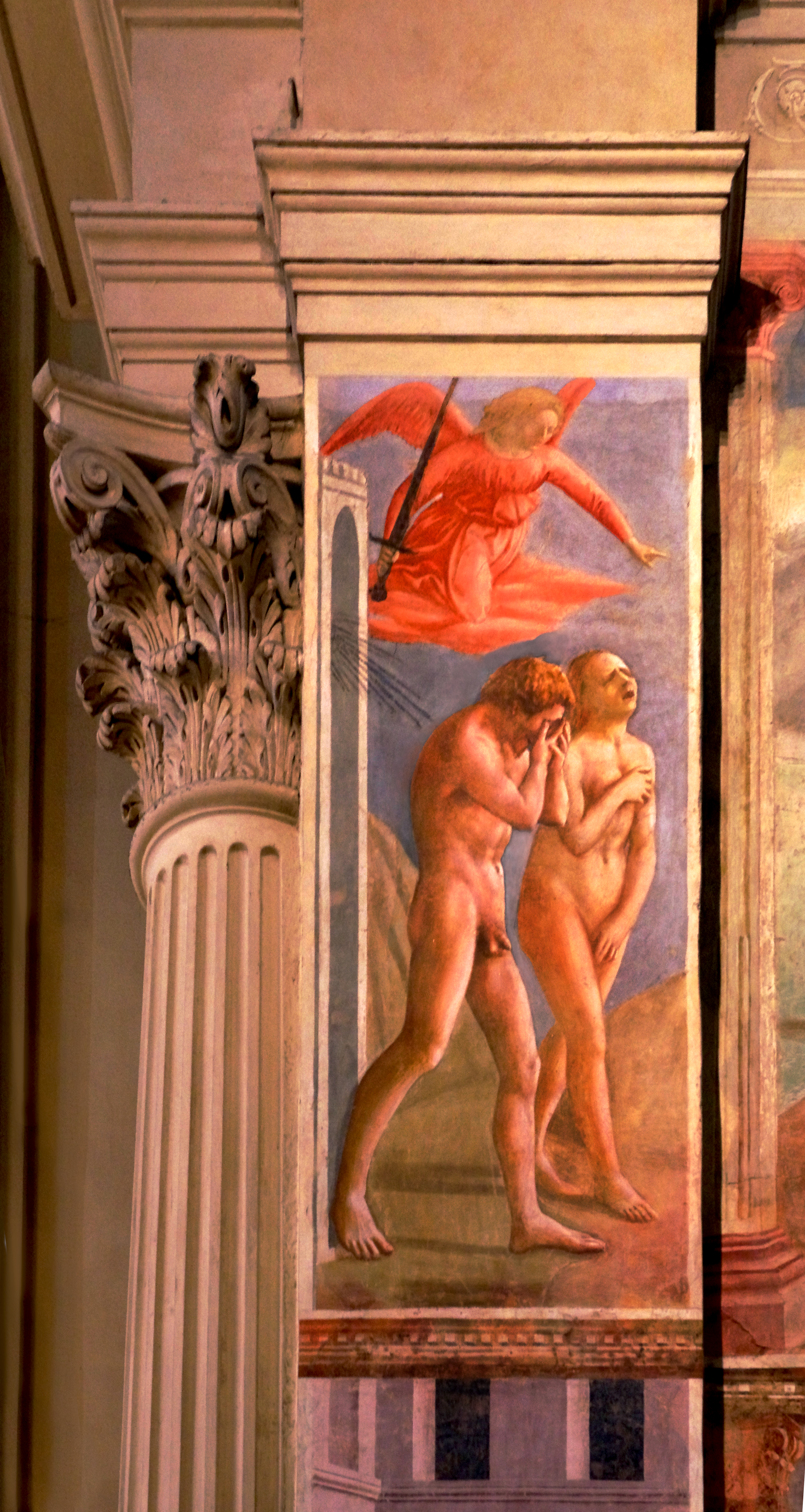
The Expulsion from the Garden of Eden

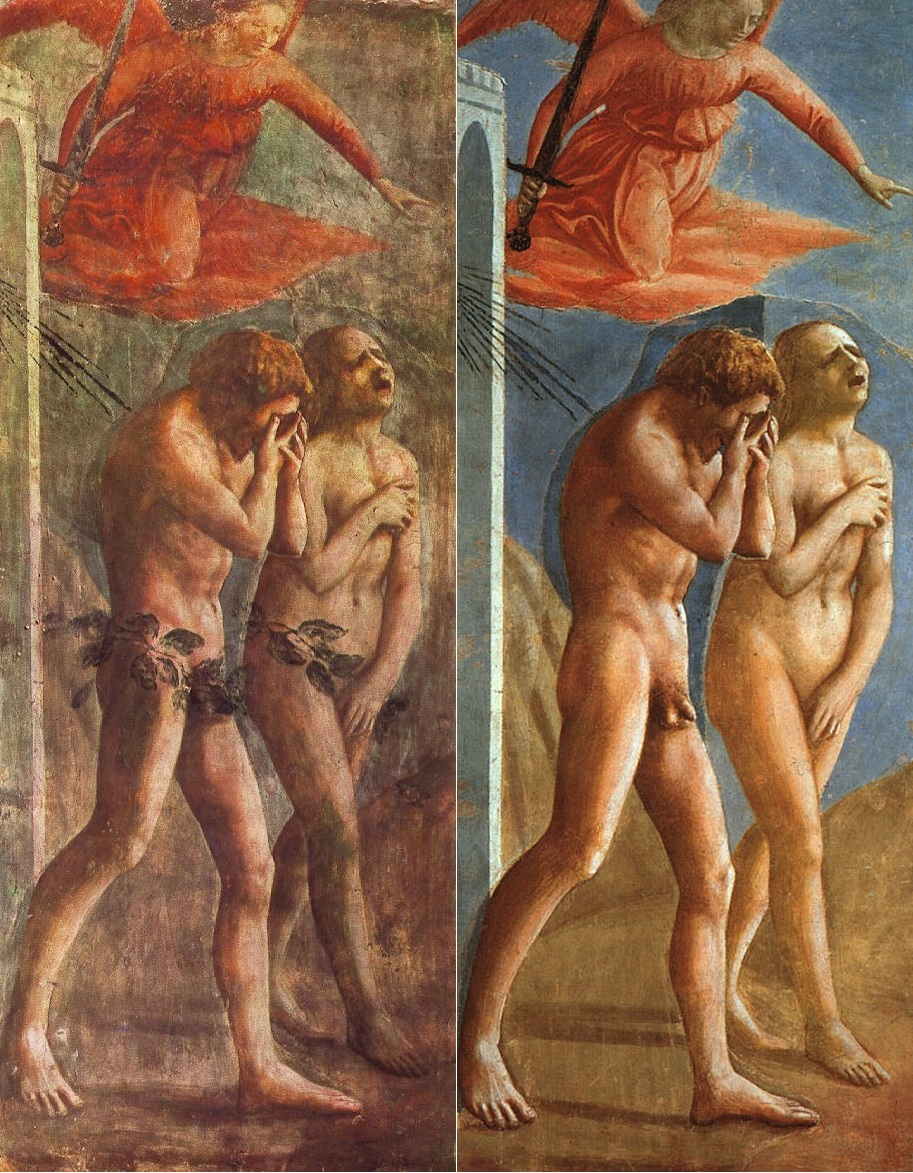
Before and after restoration

Masaccio's masterpiece Expulsion from the Garden of Eden is the first fresco on the upper part of the chapel, on the left wall, just at the left of the Tribute Money. It is famous for its vivid energy and unprecedented emotional realism. It contrasts dramatically with Masolino's delicate and decorative image of Adam and Eve before the fall, painted on the opposite wall. It presents a dramatic intensity, with an armed angel who hovers over Adam and Eve indicating the way out of the Garden of Eden: the crying sinners leave at their backs the gates of Paradise.

This work represents a neat separation from the past International Gothic style; Masolino's serene composures are also left behind, and the two biblical progenitors are portrayed in dark desperation, weighed down under the angel's stern sight, who, with his unsheathed sword, forcibly expels them, with such a tension never seen before in painting. Gestures are eloquent enough: on exiting Paradise's Gates, from where some divine rays are shooting forward, Adam covers his face in desperation and guilt; Eve covers her nudity with shame and cries out, with a pained face. The bodies' dynamism, especially Adam's, gives an unprecedented passion to the figures, firmly planted on ground and projecting shadows from the violent light modelling them. Many are the details which increase the emotional drama: Adam's damp and sticky hair (on Earth, he'll struggle with hard labour and dirt), the angel's posture, foreshortened as if diving down from above. Eve's position is from an ancient representation, that of Venus Pudica (modest Venus). The foliage covering the couple's nudities was removed during a restoration in 1990.

=== Peter's Calling ===
By Masolino.

In the left lunette, destroyed in 1746-48, Masolino had painted the Calling of Peter and Andrew, or Vocation, known thanks to some indications by past witnesses such as Vasari, Bocchi and Baldinucci. Roberto Longhi first identified an image of this lost fresco in a later drawing, which does not conform to the lunette's upper curvature, but appears today as a very probable hypothesis. In this scene, Masolino had divided his composition into two expanses, of sea and sky.

=== La Navicella ===
The opposite lunette housed the fresco of the Navicella, a traditional title for the scene where Christ, walking on water, rescues Peter from the surging waves of a storm and pulls him aboard the boat. This lunette again proposed a marine setting, on balance with the opposite scene and thus creating a sort of parable of Creation: from the skies of the Evangelists in the vault, to the seas of the upper register, to the lands and towns of the middle and lower registers, precisely like in Genesis. In a way, the viewer's sight shifts from Paradise to the terrene world in a consequential manner. Sources attribute this lunette to Masolino, but considering the alternating turns taken by the two artists on the scaffolding, some propound for a Masaccio fresco.

=== Peter's Repentance ===
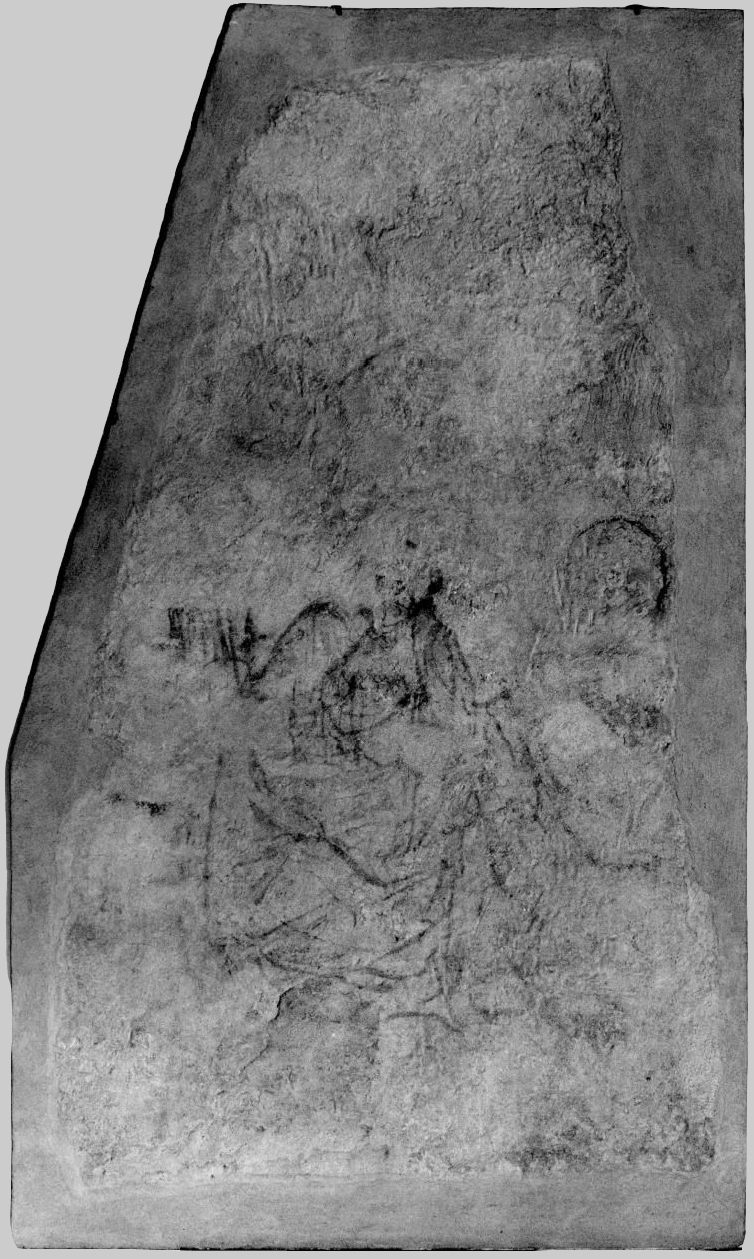
Sinopia of Peter's Repentance

Peter's Repentance is found in the left semi-lunette of the upper register, where a very schematic preparatory drawing of the sinopia was hosted. The scene was attributed to Masaccio, on the basis of its greater incisiveness in the treatment as against Masolino's work.

=== The Tribute Money ===
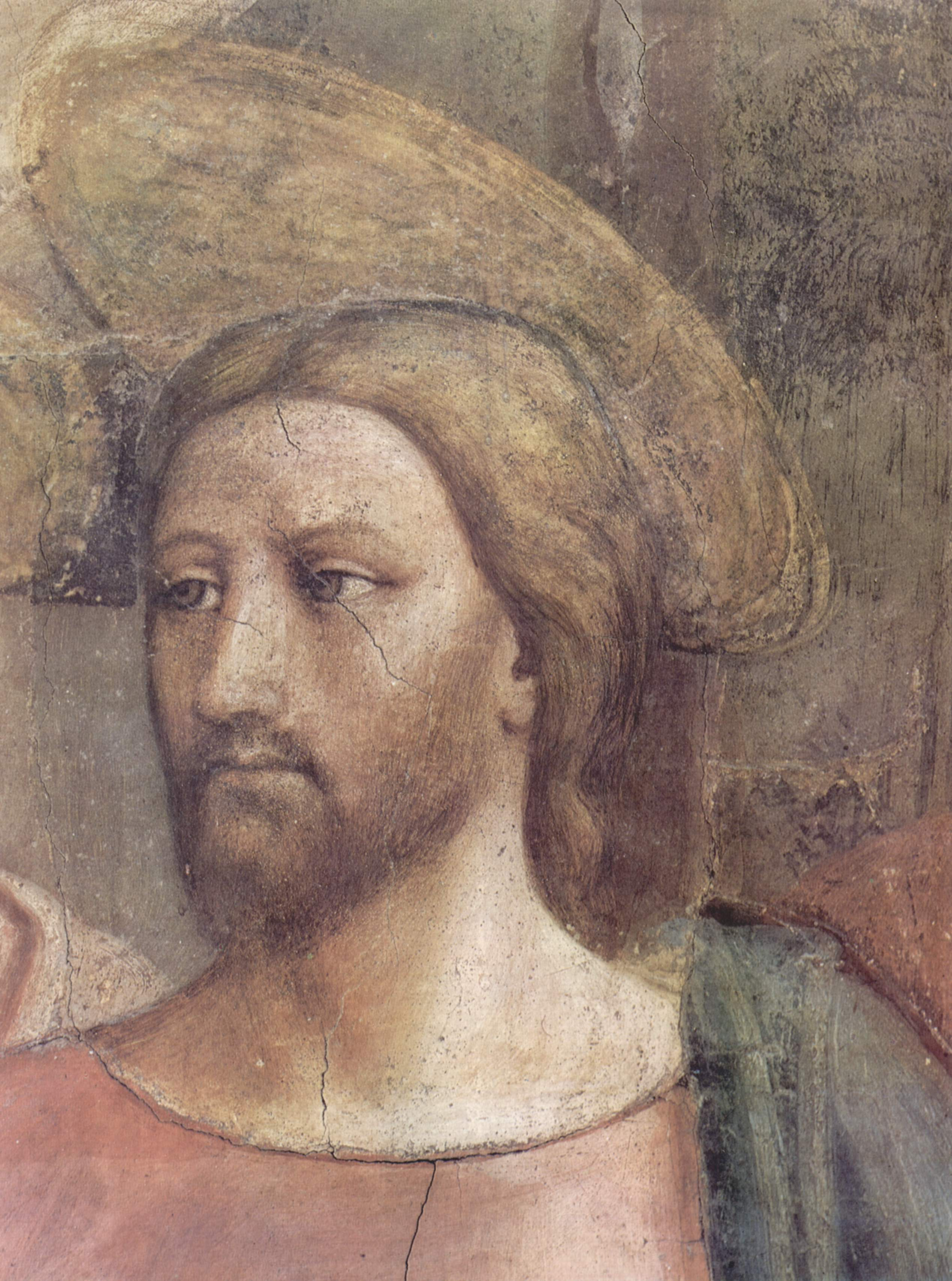
Detail of Jesus' face in the Tribute Money.

The most famous painting in the chapel is Tribute Money, on the upper left wall, with figures of Jesus and Peter shown in a three part narrative. The painting, largely attributed to Masaccio, represents the story of Peter and the tax collector from Matthew 17:24–27. The left side shows Peter getting a coin from the mouth of a fish and the right side shows Peter paying his taxes. The whole appears to be related to the establishment of the Catasto, the first income tax in Florence, in the time the painting was being executed.

The miracle is not represented in a hagiographic key, but as a human occurrence that posits a divine decision: a historical event, then, with an explicit and indubitable moral meaning. On the narrational plane, the Tribute is developed in three stages: in the central part, Christ, from whom the tax collector asks a tribute for the Temple, orders Peter to go and fetch a coin from the mouth of the first fish he can catch; on the left, Peter, squatting on the shore, takes the coin from the fish; on the right, Peter tenders the coin to the tax collector. The three stages unite and the temporal sequences are expressed in spatial measures. The absence of a chronological scansion in the narrative, is to be sought in the fact that the painting's salient motif is not so much the miracle, as the actuation of the Divine Will, expressed by Jesus' the imperative gesture. His will becomes Peter's will who, by repeating his Lord's gesture, simultaneously indicates the fulfillment of Christ's will. The apostles' solidarity is shown by their serrated grouping around Jesus, as if to form a ring, a "coliseum of men". However, the very task is given to Peter: he alone will have to deal with mundane institutions. The portico's pillar becomes a symbolic element of separation between the grouped apostles and the conclusive delivery of tribute to the tax collector on Peter's part.

In the central group, the transverse directions formed by Christ's gesture with his right arm – replicated by that of Peter and, in opposite, by the turned collector – cross with those formed by the gestures of the right group, emphasizing escape points placed in the deepest space.

=== Healing of the Cripple and Raising of Tabitha ===
The upper scene on the right wall shows, on the left side, the Healing of the Cripple and, on the right side, the Raising of Tabitha. The fresco is generally attributed to Masolino, although Masaccio's hand has been discovered by some scholars. The scene shows two different episodes, with St. Peter appearing in both of them enclosed in a scenario of a typical Tuscan city of the 15th century depicted according to the strict rules of central perspective. The latter is generally regarded as Masaccio's main contribution, whereas the two central figures show Gothic influences.

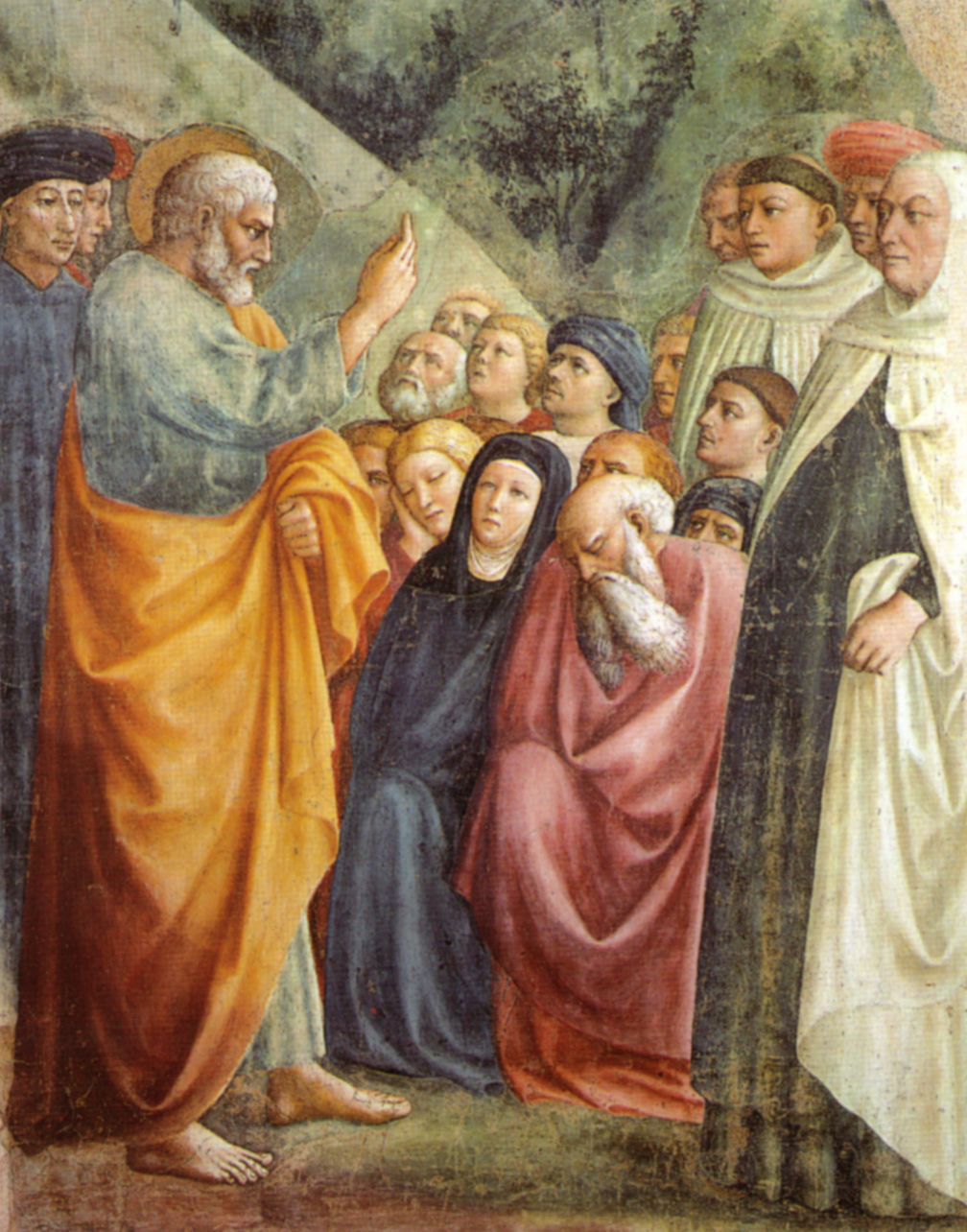
St Peter Preaching, by Masolino, restored.

=== St Peter Preaching ===
By Masolino da Panicale.

On the upper left wall one can see St Peter Preaching by Masolino, completed in eight days. Peter is shown, with an expressive gesture, preaching in front of a crowd. The people in the group have many and varied demeanours, from the sweet attention of the veiled nun in the foreground, to the sleepiness of both the girl behind her and the bearded old man, to the fear of the woman at back, whose worried eyes only can be seen. Mountains seem to continue from the preceding scene, with a spatial unity that was one of Masaccio trademarks. The three heads behind St Peter are probably portraits of contemporary people, same as the two friars on the right: all were formerly attributed to Masaccio.

=== Baptism of the Neophytes ===
By Masaccio.

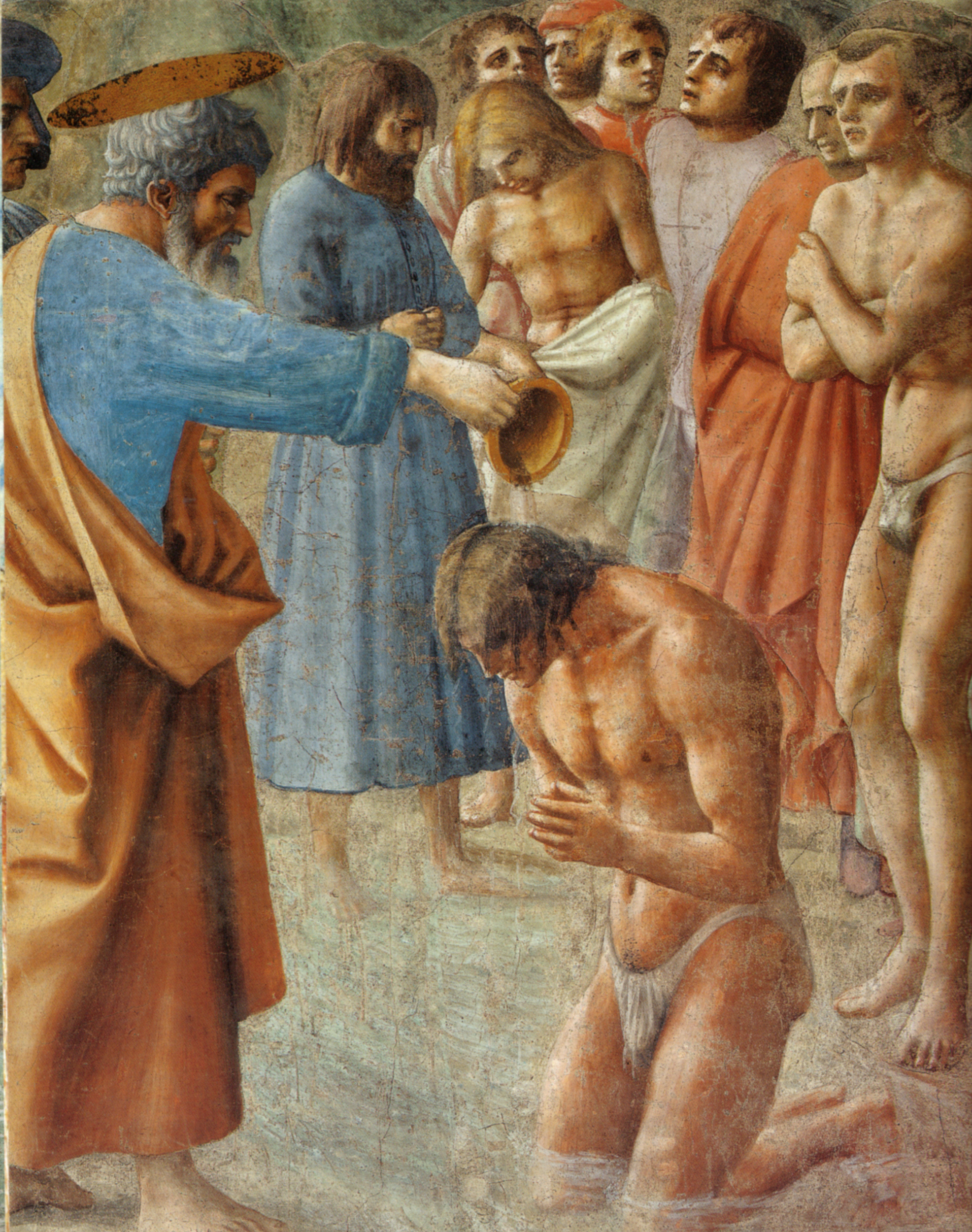
Baptism of the Neophytes, by Masaccio.

The whole composition presents details of astounding realism: the trembling neophyte, the water droplets from the baptised hair, the white sheet being removed in the background. Chromatic effects of "cangiantismo", where drapery is modelled using contrasting colours to create an effect that simulates cangiante textiles, is achieved by Masaccio through a pictorial technique based on the juxtaposition of complementary colours, later reprised by Michelangelo.

=== St Peter Healing the Sick with His Shadow ===
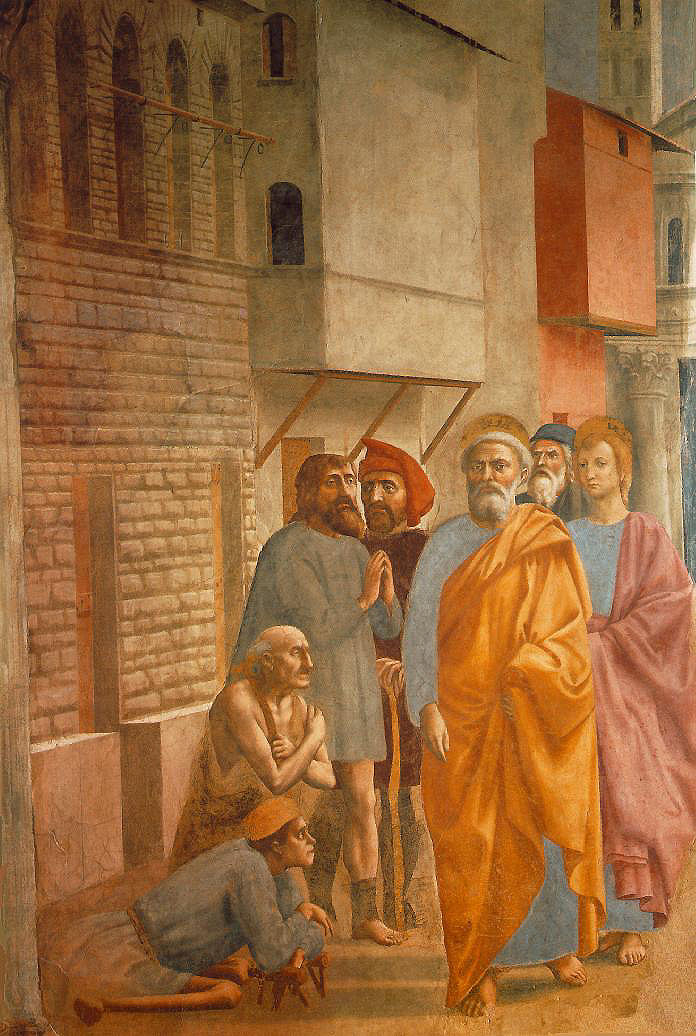
St Peter Healing the Sick with His Shadow, by Masaccio.

Lower centre wall, left side, by Masaccio. The episode depicts Acts 5:12–16.

The picture's attribution to Masaccio is based in on the perspective structure used to create the street setting and the craggy naturalism of the physiognomies of the old man and the cripple. According to Federico Zeri, Masaccio's brother, the painter Giovanni di ser Giovanni Guidi, known as Lo Scheggia, may have served as the model for the apostle John and the old bearded man in the background is a possible portrait of Donatello.

=== The Distribution of Alms and Death of Ananias ===
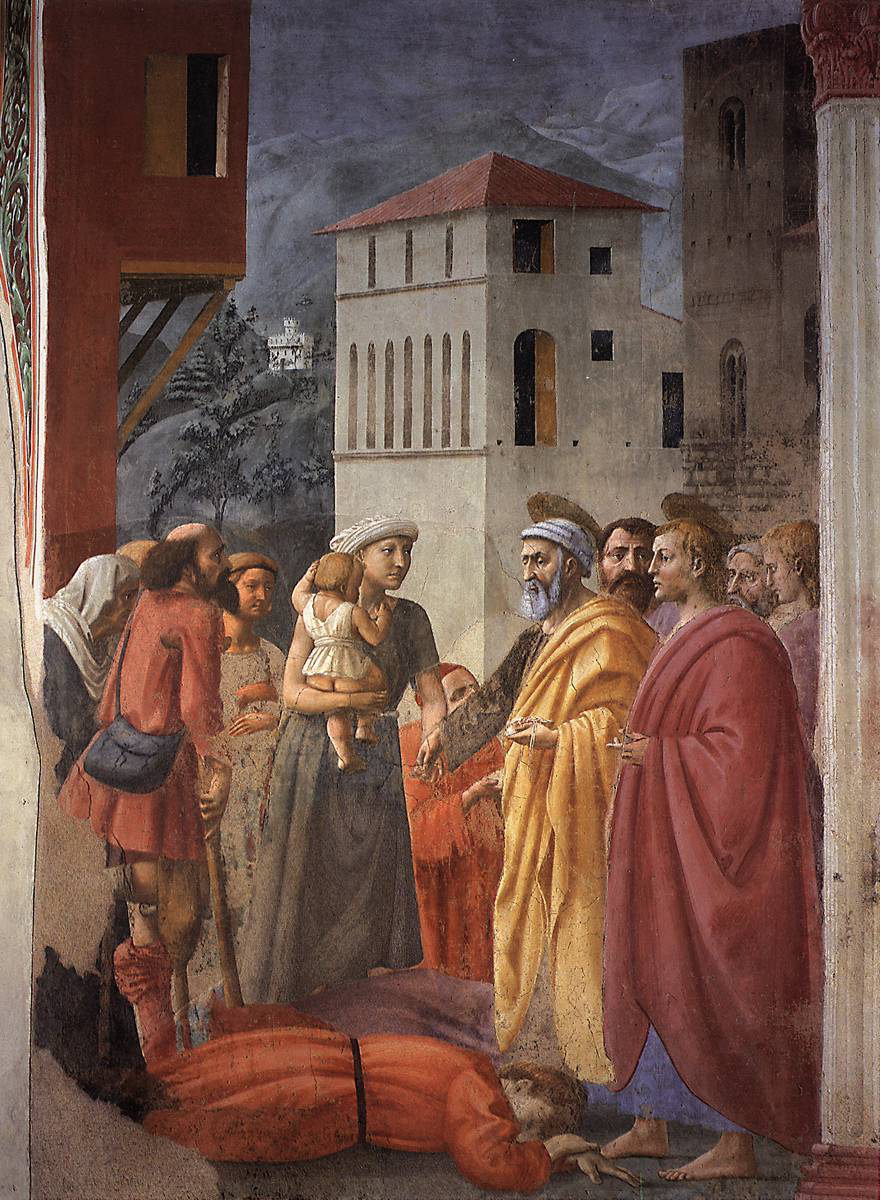
The Distribution of Alms and Death of Ananias, by Masaccio.

Lower centre wall, right side, by Masaccio.

According to the narrative in Acts 4:32;5:1–11, each Christian, after selling their own possessions, would bring the proceeds to the apostles, who distributed to everyone according to need. Only Ananias "kept back for himself some of the proceeds and brought only a part of it and laid it at the apostles' feet." Severely reprimanded by Peter, he fell to the ground and died. The composition concentrates on the moment in which Ananias lies on the ground, whilst the woman with child receives alms from Peter, accompanied by John. The compositional structure is quite tight and emotional, involving the viewer in the heart of the event.

=== Raising of the Son of Theophilus and St. Peter Enthroned ===
Lower left wall, by Masaccio, completed by Filippino Lippi approximately fifty years later.

Filippino composed the five bystanders on the left, the Carmelites' drapery and the central part of St. Peter's arm in the "enthroned" representation. According to the Legenda Aurea (Golden Legend) by Jacobus de Voragine, after release from prison, St. Peter resuscitates, with St Paul's assistance, Theophilus's son, who had died fourteen years before. So, people venerated St Peter and erected a new church to him, where he is enthroned so as to be revered and prayed by all. However, the true meaning of this fresco rests with the politics of the time: that is, in the conflict between Florence and the Duchy of Milan.

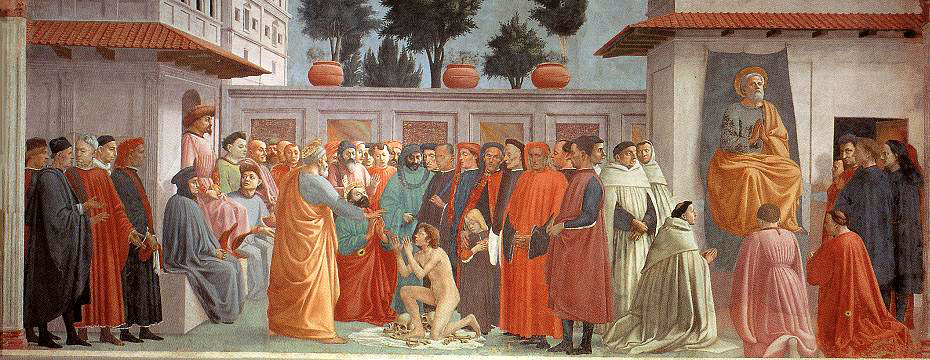
Raising of the Son of Theophilus and St Peter Enthroned, by Masaccio.

There is a precise iconographic resemblance between Theophilus (seated on the left, in an elevated position within a niche) and Gian Galeazzo Visconti, Florence's bitter enemy. The latter was a feared tyrant, whose thirst for power pushed him to start a war with Florence, almost destroying its freedom. Memory of this episode returned in all its crude vividness, when Florence had to confront a dispute with Filippo Maria Visconti, Gian Galeazzo's son. The figure sitting on Theophilus' (i.e., Gian Galeazzo's) right would be the Florentine chancellor Coluccio Salutati, author of an invective against the Lombard lord. St Peter's presence, therefore, symbolizes the mediating role of the Church in the person of Pope Martin V, to sedate the conflict between Milan and Florence. At the extreme right, a group of four bystanders should personify Masaccio (looking away from the painting), Masolino (the shortest one), Leon Battista Alberti (in the foreground); and Filippo Brunelleschi (the last). The frequent use of portraiture makes the imaginary world of painting and the viewer's personal experience converge. For Masaccio's contemporaries it should have been easier to read this scene as a reflection of themselves and their own social realities. The fresco's figures populate a dilated space of their own world and have a natural demeanor: they stretch their necks to see better, they look over their neighbour's shoulder, gesticulate, observe, and gossip about the event with the next bystander.

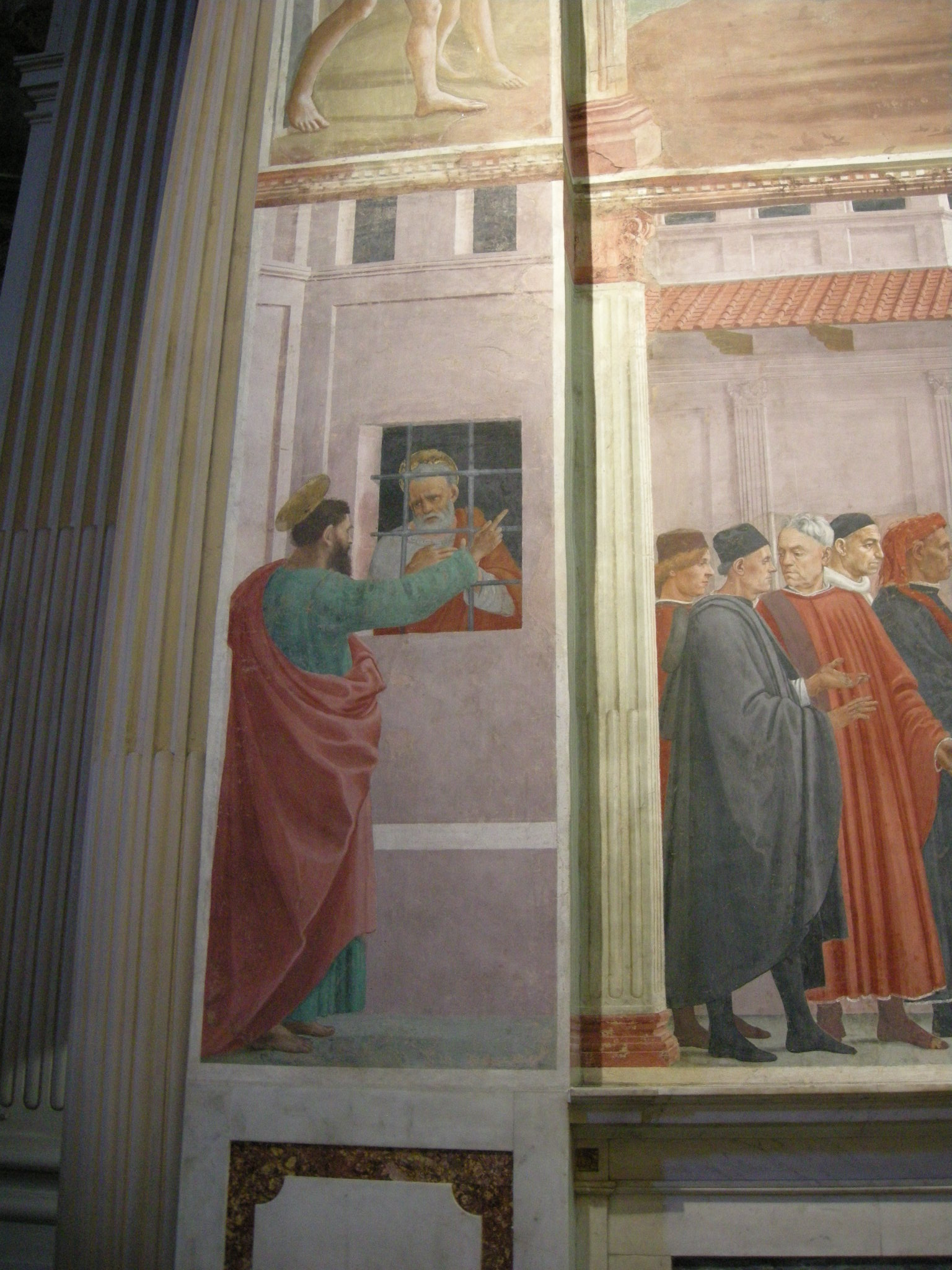
St Paul Visiting St Peter in Prison

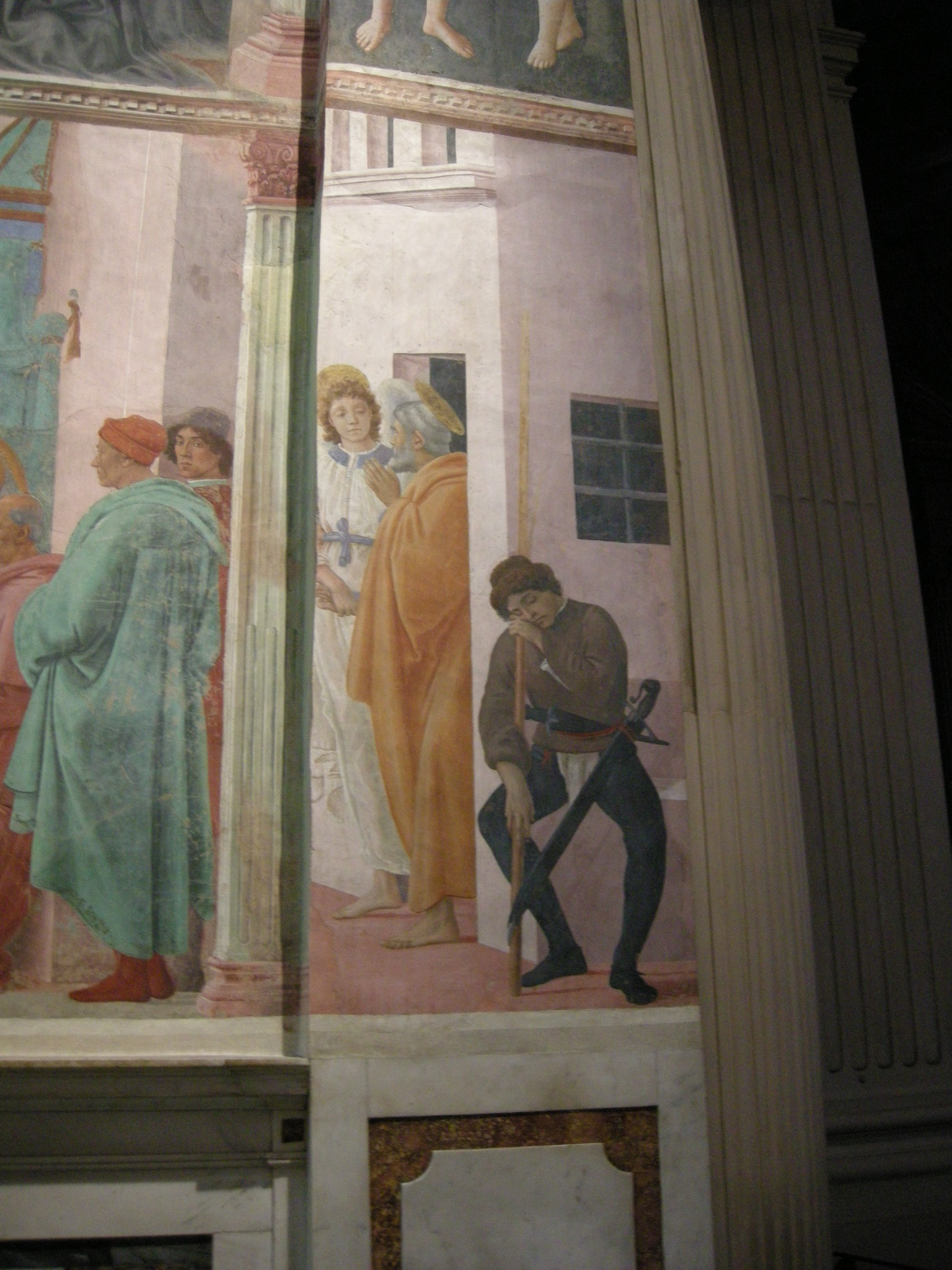
St Peter Being Freed from Prison

=== St Paul Visiting St Peter in Prison ===
By Filippino Lippi.

The cycle continues towards the left, on the pillar, in the lower register, with the scene of St Peter in Prison visited by St Paul, painted by Filippino Lippi. St Peter is visible at a window with bars, while the visitor gives his back to the viewer. Perhaps the scene followed a drawing by Masaccio, as shown by the perfect architectural continuity with the adjacent scene of the Resurrection of the Son of Theophilus.

Decoration of the Brancacci Chapel stayed incomplete due to Masaccio's departure to Rome in 1427, where he died a year later. Moreover, the commissioning patron's exile in 1436 hindered any possibility of the frescos completion by other artists; in fact, it is probable that some parts already painted by Masaccio were removed as a sort of damnatio memoriae, because of their portraiture of the Brancacci family members. Only with the return of this family to Florence in 1480, the frescos could be resumed, by commissioning the artist closer and more faithful to the great Masaccio tradition, that is to say, Filippino Lippi, the son of his first apprentice. Filippino's intervention is not documented with precision, but is datable to ca. 1485 thanks to some indications given by Giorgio Vasari.

=== St Peter Being Freed from Prison ===
Lower right wall, right side. By Filippino Lippi.

This is the last scene, to be related to the imprisoned saint on the opposite wall. In fact, it shows St Peter's liberation from prison by an angel, and it's entirely attributable to Filippino Lippi. Here too the architecture is connected with that of the adjacent depiction. The sword-armed guard sleeps in the foreground, leaning on a stick, whilst the miraculous rescue is happening – this implies Christian salvation, as well as perhaps Florence's recovered autonomy after the contention with Milan.

=== Disputation with Simon Magus and Crucifixion of St Peter ===
Lower right wall, centre. By Filippino Lippi.

The large panel in the lower register, right wall, is by Filippino Lippi. Outside the city walls, (in Rome, as indicated by the Pyramid of Cestius along the Aurelian Walls and by the edifices peeking from the merlons) one may see, on the right, the disputation between Simon Magus and St Peter in front of Nero, with a pagan idol lying at the latter's feet. On the left, Peter's crucifixion is taking place: the saint is hanging upside down because he refused to be crucified in the same position as Christ's. The scene is replete with portraits: the youth with a beret on the extreme right is Filippino's self-portrait. The old man with a red hat in the group near St Peter and Simon Magus, is Antonio del Pollaiuolo. The young man below the archway and looking towards the viewer, is a portrait of Sandro Botticelli, Filippino's friend and teacher. In Simon Magus, some critics wish to see the poet Dante Alighieri, celebrated as the creator of the renowned Italian vernacular used by Lorenzo il Magnifico and Agnolo Poliziano.

== Layout of the painting complex ==
Left wall

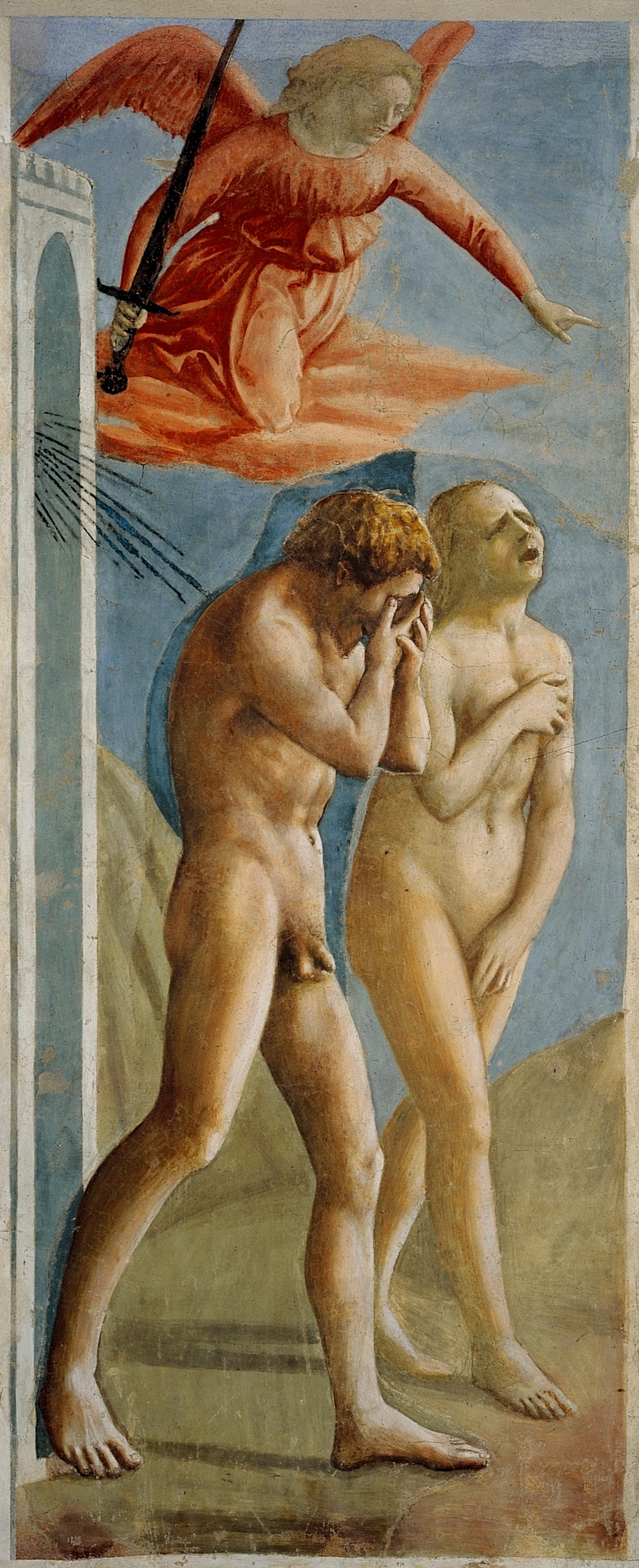
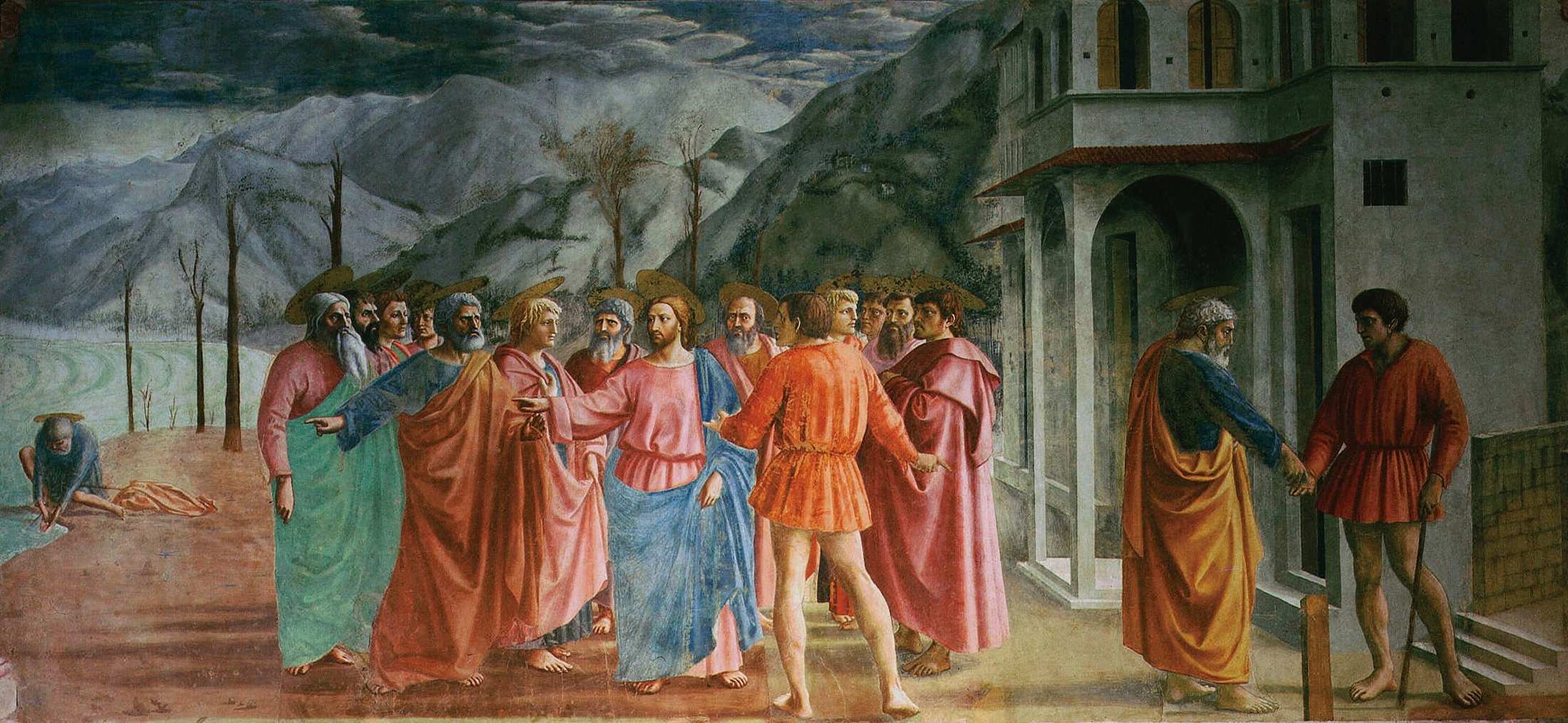
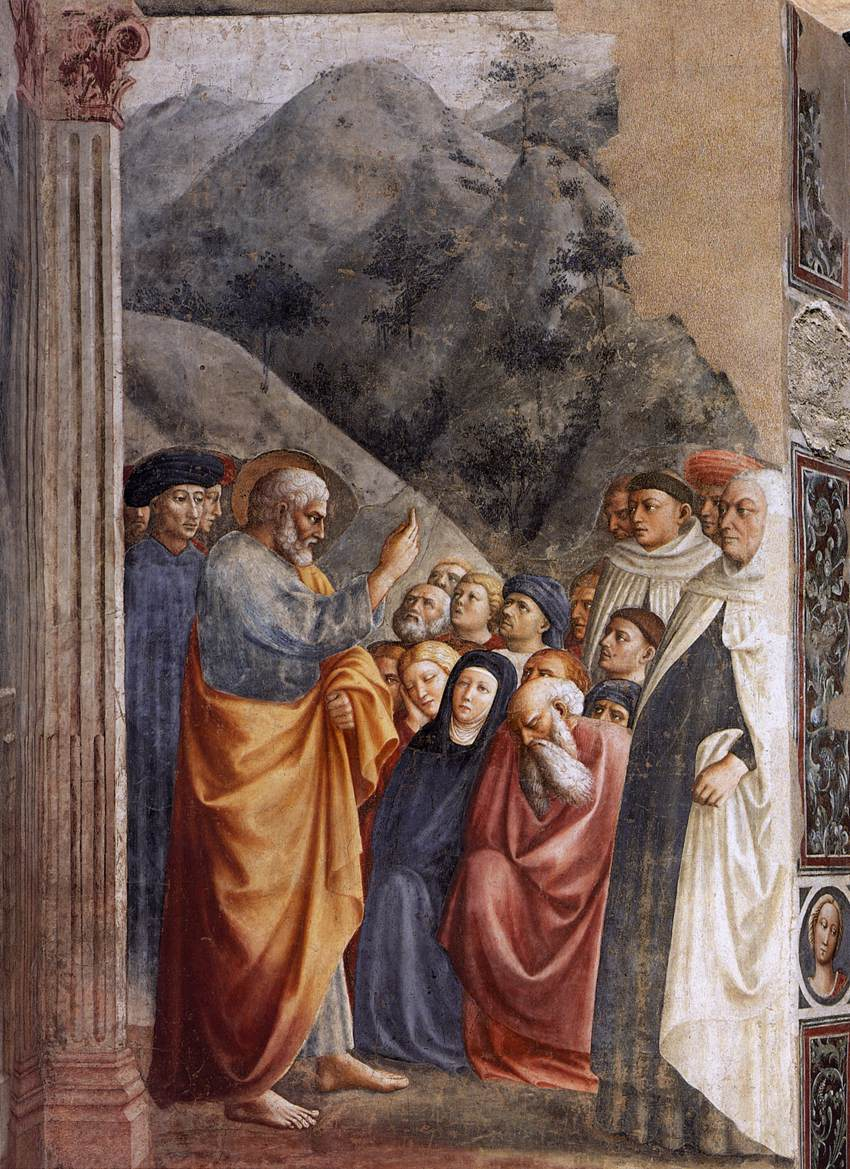

Left wall, higher part II. Expulsion of Adam and Eve (Masaccio), V. Tribute (Masaccio), IX. St Peter Preaching (Masolino, detail)

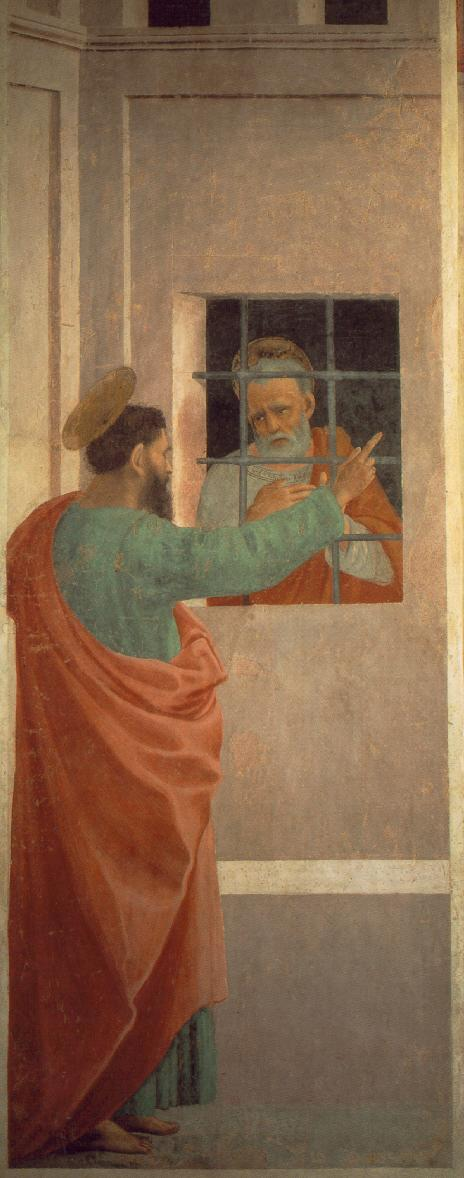
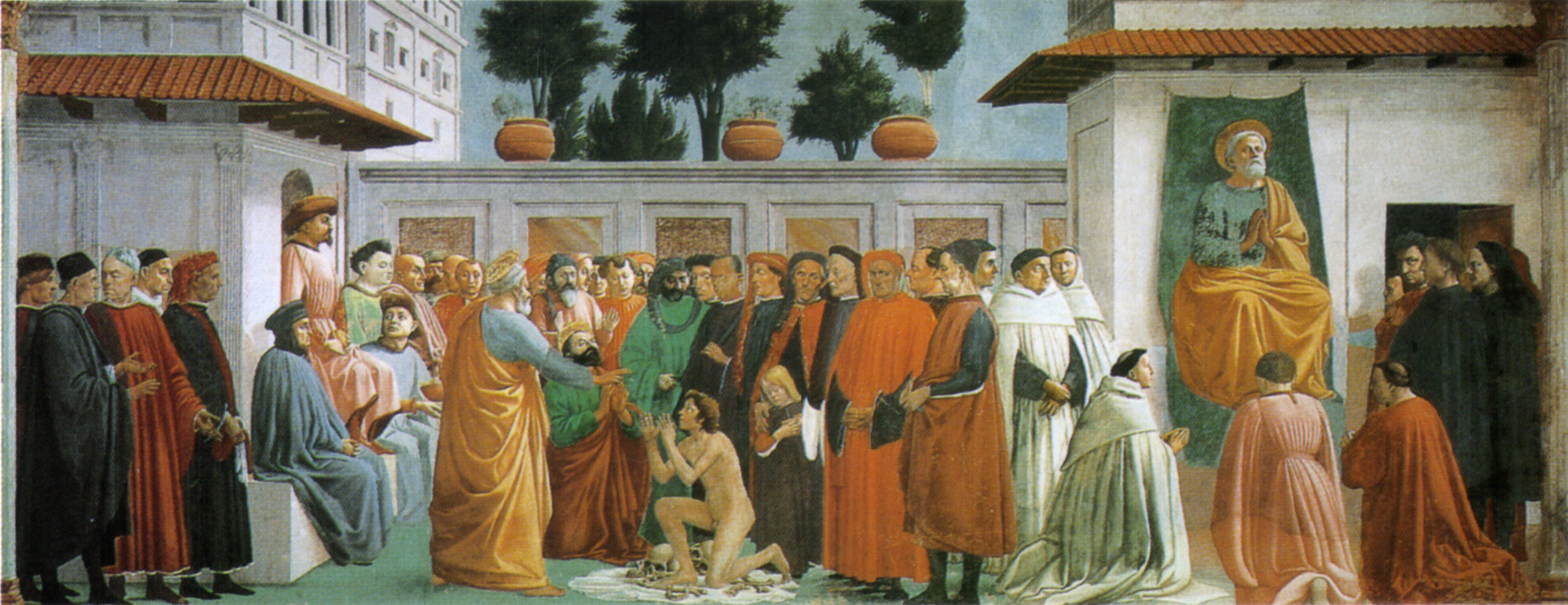
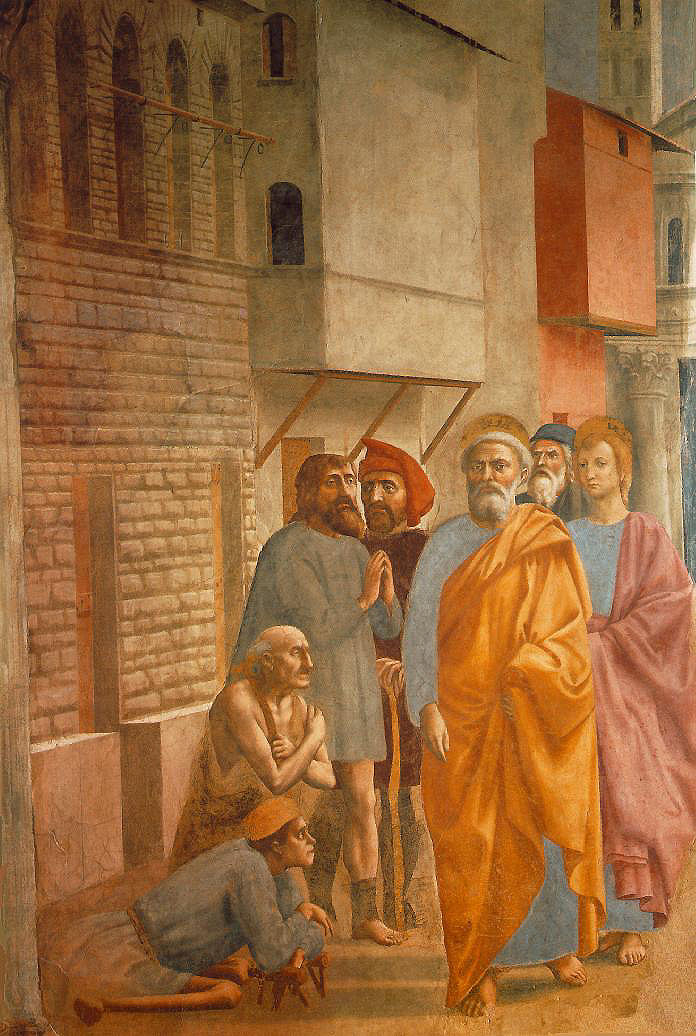

Left wall, lower part XIII. St Paul Visiting St Peter in Prison (Filippino Lippi, unrestored), XV. Raising of the Son of Theophilus and St Peter Enthroned (Masaccio and Filippino Lippi), XI. St Peter Healing the Sick with His Shadow (Masaccio)

Right wall

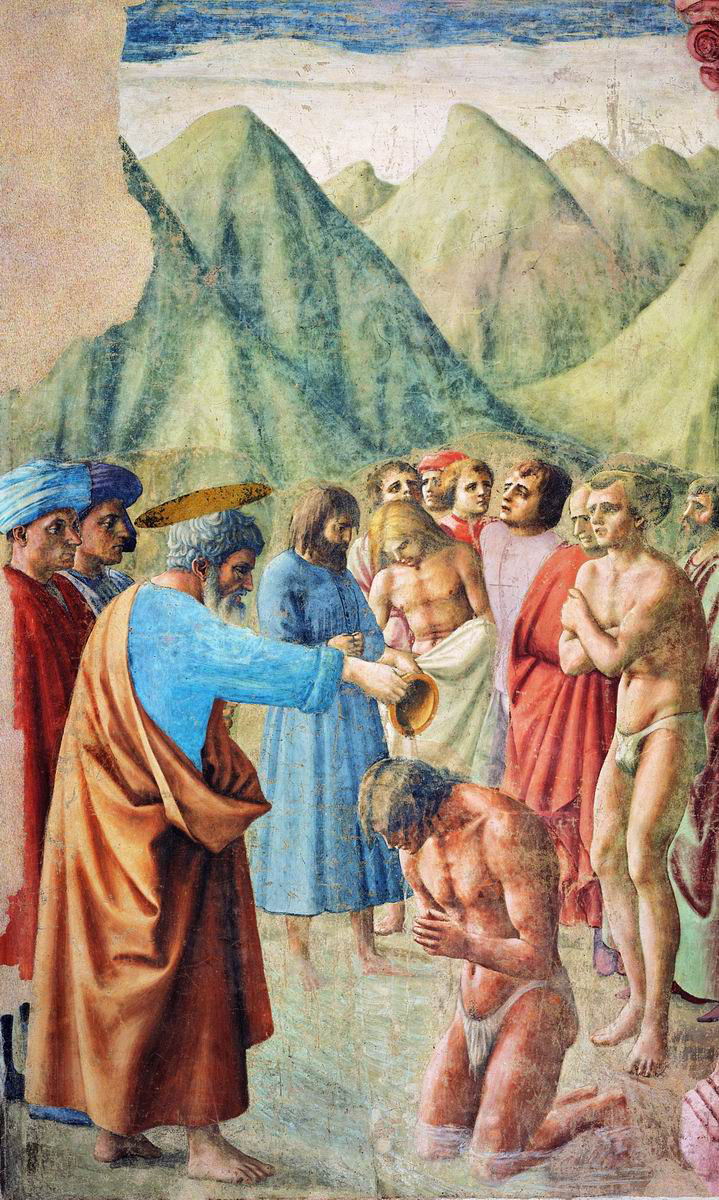
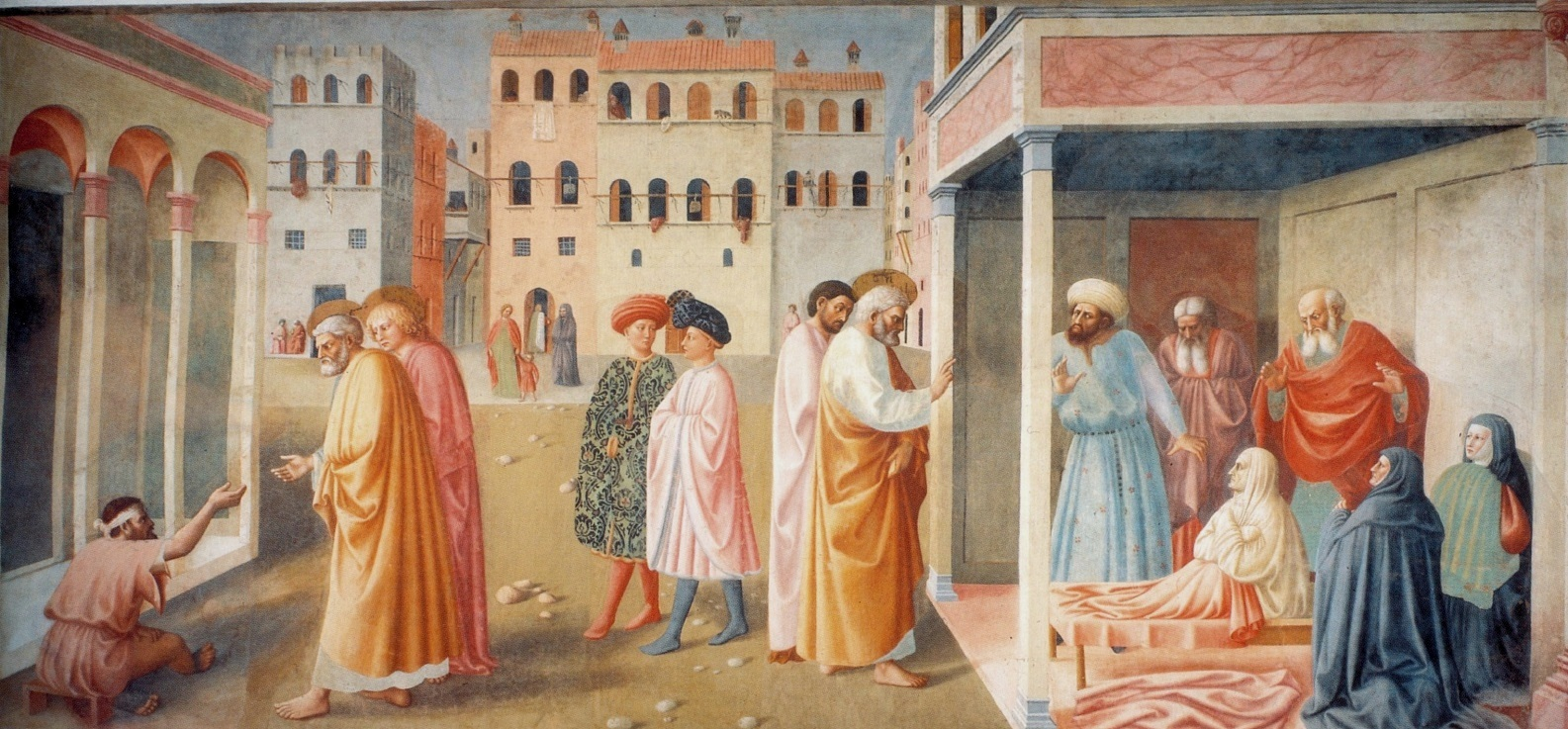
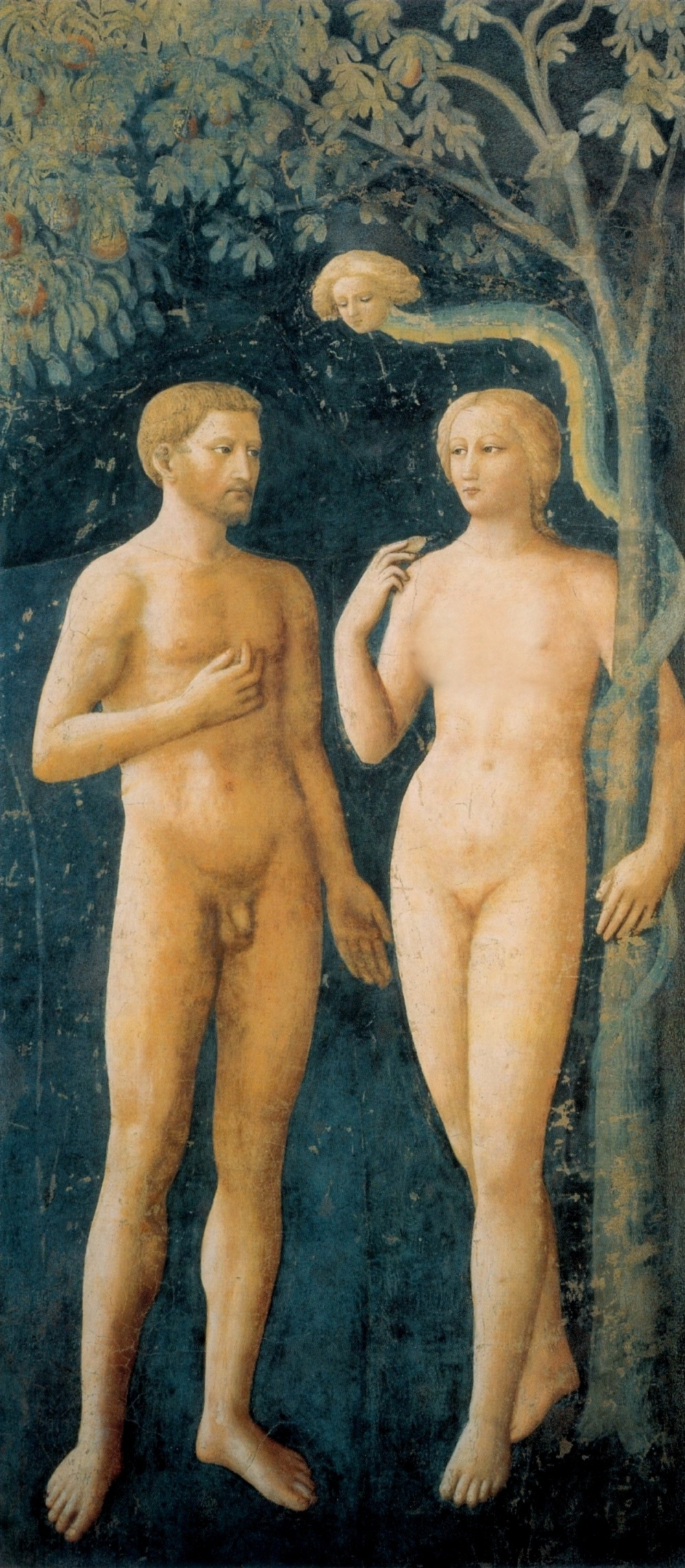

Right wall, higher part X. Baptism of the Neophytes (Masaccio), VI. Healing of the Cripple and Raising of Tabitha (Masolino), I=Original Sin (Masolino)

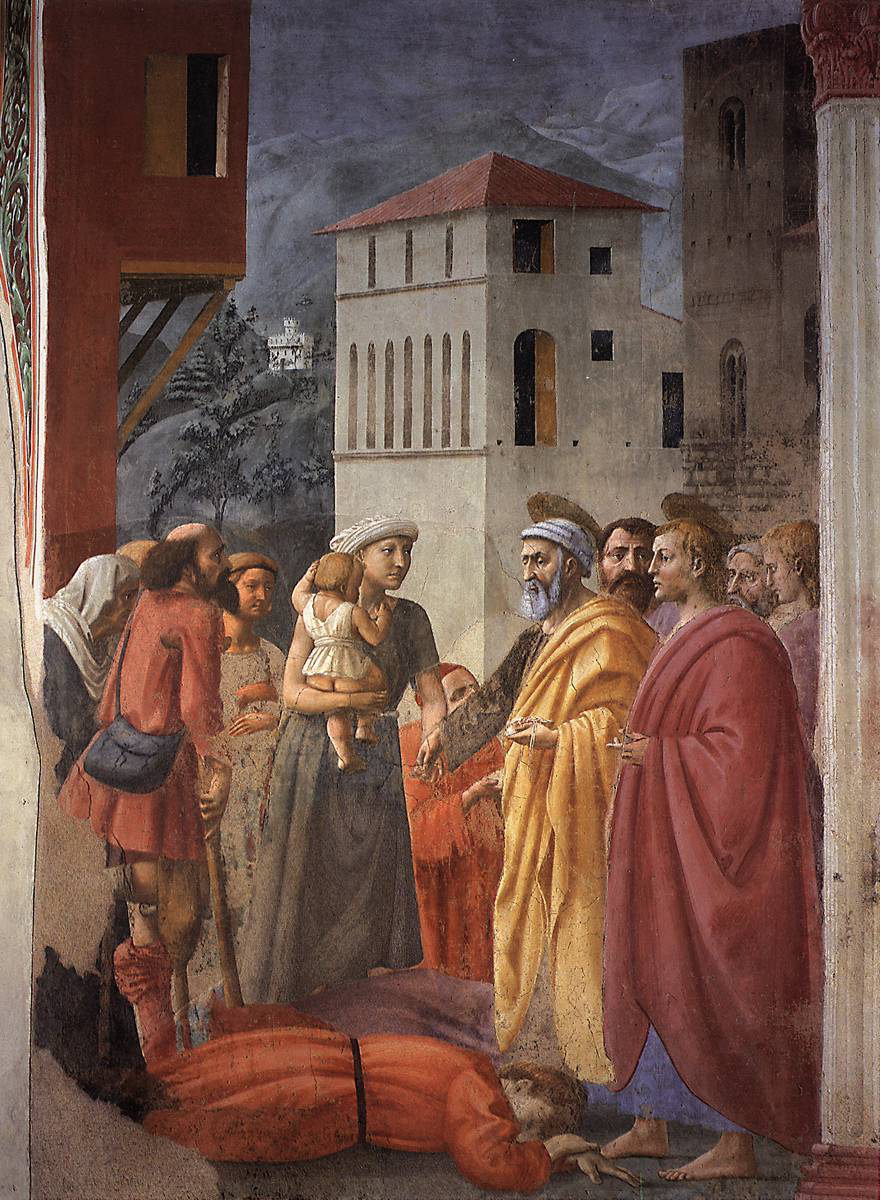
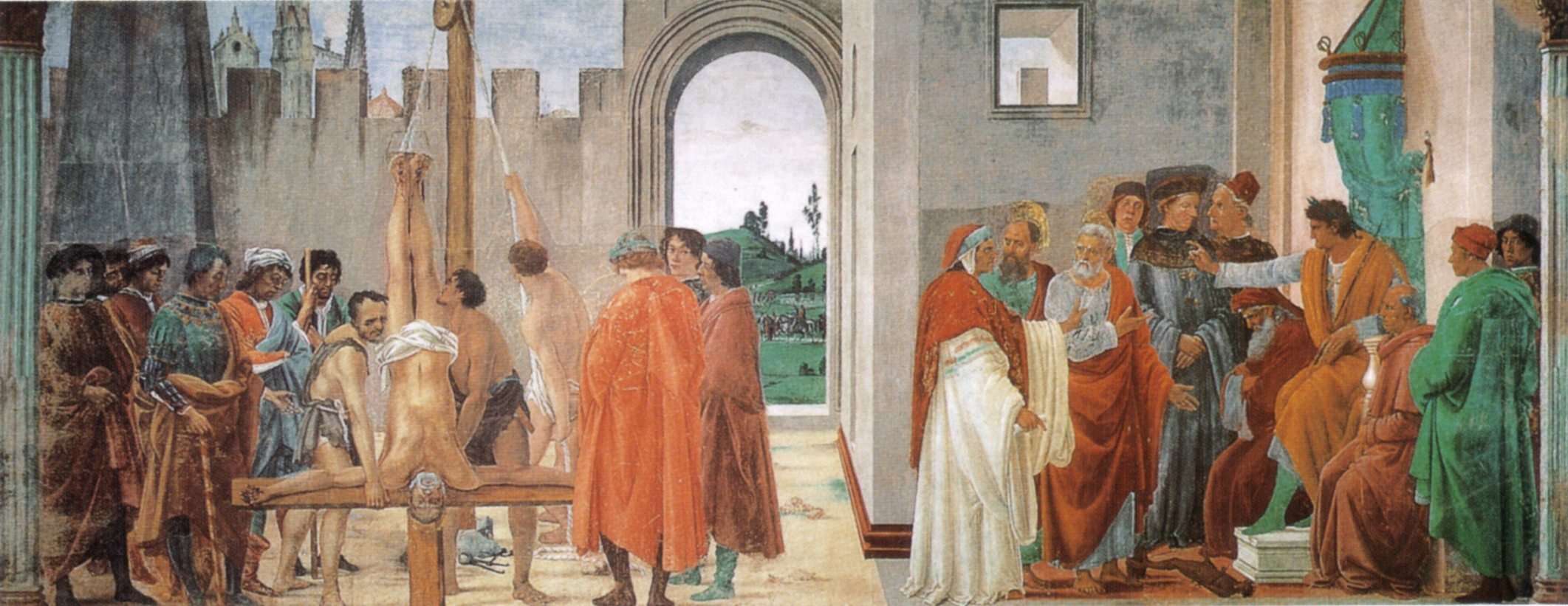
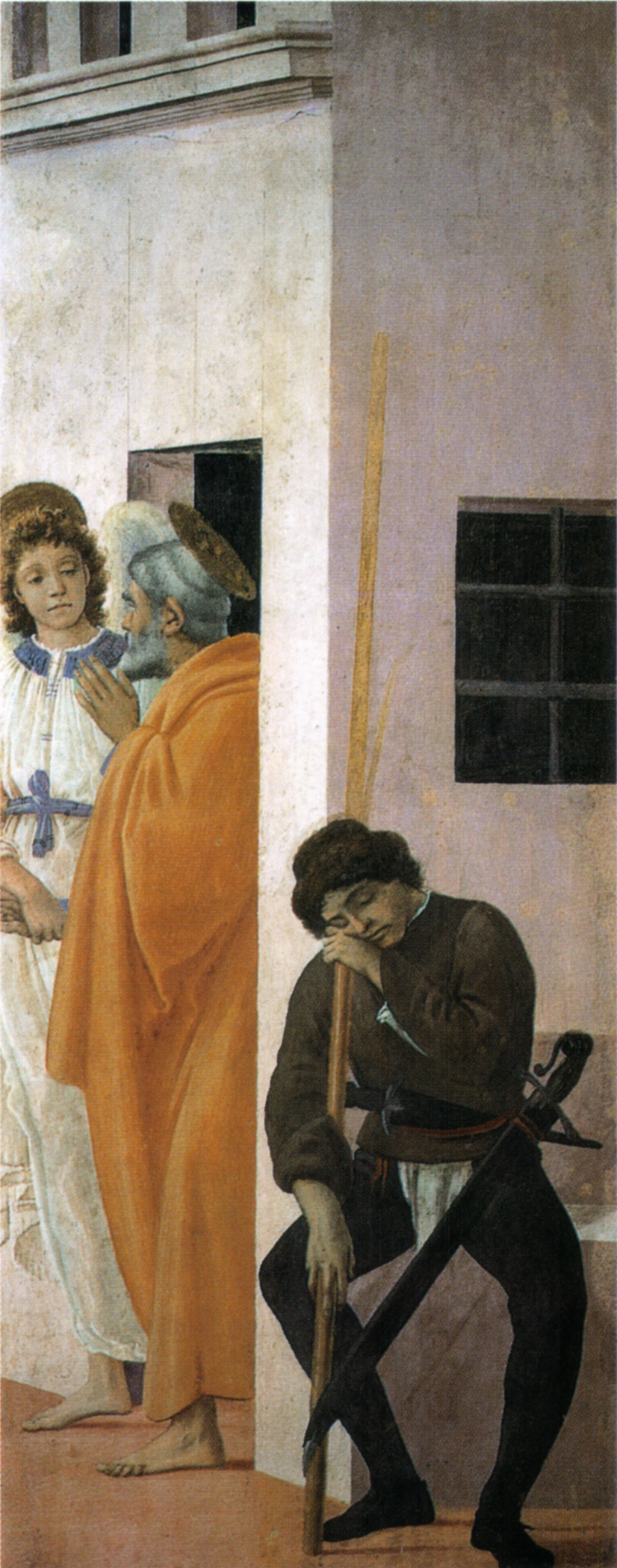

Right wall, lower part XII. The Distribution of Alms and Death of Ananias (Masaccio), XVI. Disputation with Simon Magus and Crucifixion of St Peter (Filippino Lippi), XIV. St Peter Being Freed from Prison (Filippino Lippi)

== Influence ==
Masaccio's application of scientific perspective, unified lighting, use of chiaroscuro and skill in rendering the figures naturalistically established new traditions in Renaissance Florence that some scholars credit with helping to found the new Renaissance style.

The young Michelangelo was one of the many artists who received his artistic training by copying Masaccio's work in the chapel. The chapel was also the site of an assault on Michelangelo by rival sculptor Pietro Torrigiano, who resented Michelangelo's critical remarks about his draughtsmanship. He punched the artist so severely that he "crushed his nose like a biscuit" (according to Benvenuto Cellini) which deformed Michelangelo's face into that of a boxer's.

== Restoration ==
The first restoration of the chapel frescoes was in 1481-1482, by Filippino Lippi, who was also responsible for completing the cycle. Due to the lamps used for lighting the dark chapel, the frescoes were relatively quickly coated in dust and dirt from the smoke. Another restoration was conducted at the end of the 16th century. Around 1670, sculptures were added, and the fresco-secco additions were made to the frescoes, to hide the various cases of nudity. Late 20th century restoration removed the overpainting and collected dust and dirt. Some critics, including professor and art historian James H. Beck, have criticised these efforts, while others, including professors, historians and restorers, have praised the work done on the chapel.

== See also ==
- List of major paintings by Masaccio
