= Beatrice Bocci =

Italian showgirl, beauty pageant winner and television presenter

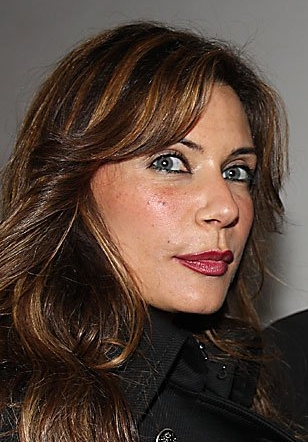
- Beatrice Bocci (2008)
- Born: 8 April 1970 (age 55); San Giovanni Valdarno, Italy
- Occupation: Television presenter

Beatrice Bocci (born 8 April 1970) is an Italian showgirl, beauty pageant winner and television presenter. In 1994 she was crowned Miss Tuscany and later placed first runner-up at Miss Italia 1994. She has hosted the shows Su le mani and Va ora in onda both on RAI 1.

== Biography ==
She became known to the general public in 1994 when, already married and the mother of a little girl, she first won the title of Miss Tuscany and then, at the final of Miss Italy 1994 in Salsomaggiore Terme, came in second place, behind Alessandra Meloni. In the following months she worked in fashion as a model (she participated in the Rome fashion show in Piazza di Spagna) and then made her debut in dance and theater under Tonino Viviani. Later she became a TV host first on Rai 1 with La Rai che vedrai and then with Granfesta and Stadium on the Tuscan broadcaster Canale 10, directed by Franco Boldrini. In the following years she participated in two Rai 1 summer programs, Su le mani (in 1996) and Va ora in onda (in 1997), both by Carlo Conti.

1997 was an important year for her both on a professional level, as she presented the summer previews of Miss Italia 1997 on Rai 1 and starred in a television commercial for the Vodafone Italy telephone company, and on an emotional level, as she met anchorman Alessandro Greco (a namesake of her ex-husband), by whom she later had a son, Lorenzo. She has also had some acting experience, participating in Linda e il brigadiere and the TV show Un medico in famiglia, in which she plays Elena Solari, a character who appears in the first three seasons (1998-2003) in some VHS watched by the main characters, and also is seen sporadically in photographs in later seasons.

In the 2003-2004 television season he co-hosts with Alessandro Greco the culinary program Sale e pepe...q.b., aired for seventy-five episodes on the satellite channel Alice (in the Sky circuit). In the fall of 2005 he took part as a contestant in the second edition of the reality show La talpa, hosted by Paola Perego on Italia 1, reaching the final and finishing in third place. In 2006, she joined the cast of Verissimo (TV series) as a regular columnist in the space called Big Brother Trial, dedicated to analyzing the episodes of the sixth edition of Grande Fratello.

Since 2007 she has been back on the Alice channel where she hosts the program Dolci & Delizie together with pastry chef Valentina Gigli.

In 2011, she presented an episode of the program Una giornata particolare a spasso con le Miss, a preview of Miss Italia 2011. On December 26, 2018, she hosts the 14th edition of the In Memory of John Paul II award on Rai 1 in the second evening. In 2019, she published her first book, entitled Ho scelto Gesù. An Infinite Love Story, written together with her husband Alessandro Greco.
