= Bocchi =

Bocchi is an Italian surname. Notable people with the surname include:

- Achille Bocchi (1488–1562), Italian writer
- Alessandro Magnoli Bocchi (born 1968), Italian economist
- Adolfo Bocchi (1892–?), Italian bobsledder
- Amedeo Bocchi (1883–1976), Italian painter
- Arrigo Bocchi (born c. 1871), British-Italian film director and producer
- Dorotea Bocchi (1360–1436), Italian physician also known as Dorotea Bucca
- Faustino Bocchi, Italian painter
- Francesco Bocchi (1548–1613/1618), Italian writer
- Giancarlo Bocchi, Italian filmmaker
- Gianluca Bocchi (born 1954), Italian philosopher
- Mabel Bocchi (1953–2025), Italian basketball player
- Norberto Bocchi (born 1961), Italian bridge player
- Tobia Bocchi (born 1997), Italian triple jumper

== See also ==
- Bocchi the Rock!, manga series
- Hitori Bocchi no Marumaru Seikatsu, manga series
- Palazzo Bocchi, palace located in Bologna, Italy
- Bocci (surname)
