= Saint's name =

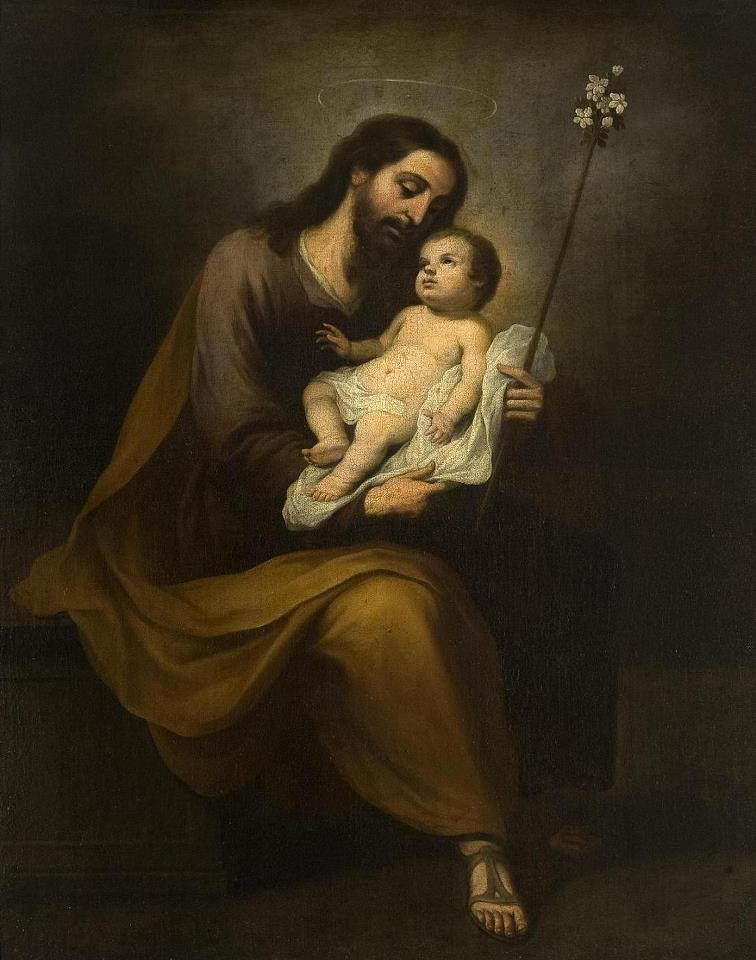
Many Christian parents have named their sons with the biblical saint name of Joseph, in honour of Saint Joseph, father of Jesus.

A saint's name, which is often also a biblical name, is the name of a saint given to individuals at their baptism or confirmation within the Catholic Church, as well as in certain parts of the Eastern Orthodox Church, the Oriental Orthodox Churches, Lutheran Churches and Anglican Communion. It is believed that the saint whose name is chosen will serve as a special patron to protect and guide and will be the heavenly intercessor for the individual who bears their name.

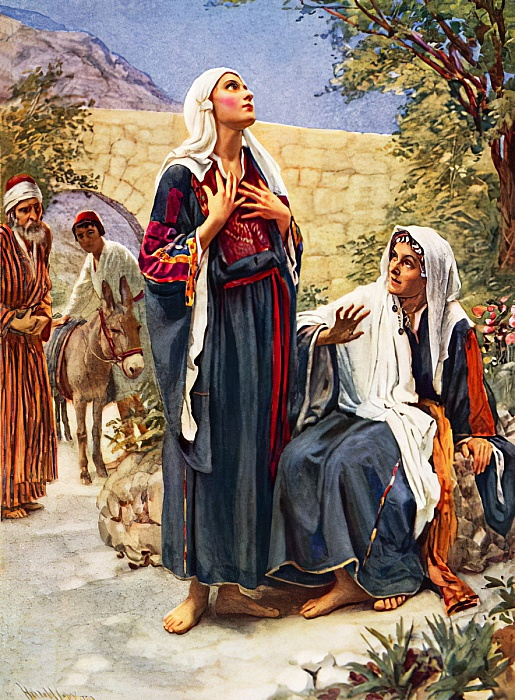
Girls are often named with the biblical saint name 'Elizabeth' by Christian parents, in honour of Saint Elizabeth, the mother of the last prophet John the Baptist.

The custom of giving the name of a saint originated with the practice of individuals who converted to Christianity taking a new Christian name at their baptism. The custom was popular in France and Germany during the Middle Ages and is still customary in continental Europe. In many English-speaking countries, however, it is more common for the saint's name to be adopted upon Confirmation in which case it would usually not be part of one's legal name.

Under the current Code of Canon Law of the Catholic Church, Canon 855 states, "Parents, sponsors and parish priests are to take care that a name is not given which is foreign to Christian sentiment", which would simply prohibit a baptismal name being something in the vein of "Satan", "Lucifer", or "Death". However, that was not always the case; in the 1917 Code of Canon Law, Canon 761 required pastors to ensure the baptismal name was a Christian name such as "Christian", "Grace", or "Faith". Therefore, what is now called a given name was once referred to as a Christian name and originated with the pagans of Europe who discarded their pagan names for Biblical ones when they converted to Christianity and participated in baptism. An additional saint's name must be given when the former is impossible.

In some Christian countries, the saint's day of the person's name is celebrated as a birthday is in other countries (cf. Name day). A child may also be named after the saint whose feast is the child's birthday. In places where Christians are in the minority and may face persecution, parents may give both a Christian saint's name and a secular name to a child, allowing them to use the saint's name for religious purposes and the secular name for all other purposes. This is especially common in cultures, such as in South Korea, where traditional given names do not line up with Catholic saints' names; many Catholics in English-speaking countries of Korean descent use a Korean forename as well as a saints' name.

== See also ==
- List of biblical names
- Calendar of saints
- Dedication of churches
