= San Giovenale Triptych =

1422 Italian Renaissance painting by Masaccio

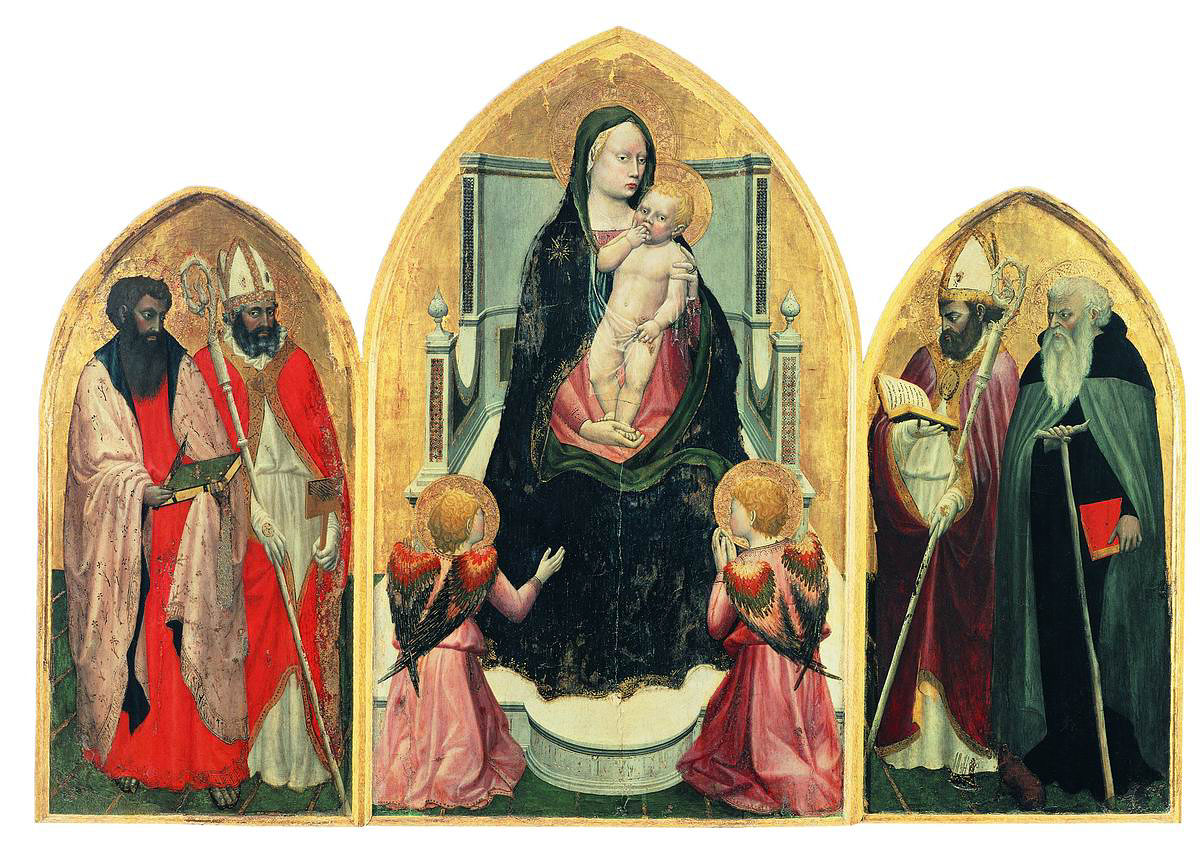
- Artist: Masaccio
- Year: 1422
- Type: Tempera on wooden panels
- Dimensions: 108 cm × 65 cm (43 in × 26 in)
- Location: Masaccio Museum of Sacred Art, S. Pietro a Cascia di Reggello (FI)

San Giovenale Triptych is a 1422 painting by Italian Renaissance artist Masaccio, housed in the Masaccio Museum of Sacred Art at Cascia di Reggello, in the Metropolitan City of Florence. The triptych is the first work attributed to Masaccio and the earliest known painting essay using the geometric Renaissance perspective.

== Description ==
The Triptych is a tempera on wooden panels . The central panel is 108 cm × 65 cm (43 in × 26 in) and the two side panels are 88 cm × 44 cm (35 in × 17 in).

At the bottom of the panels, the inscriptions are in modern humanist letters for the first time in Europe, not inscribed in Gothic characters:

(ANNO DO)MINI MCCCCXXII A DI VENTITRE D'AP(RILE) - [April 23, 1422] - under the central panel

(PLE)NA DOMINUS. TECUM. BENEDICTA - on the throne step

and traces of the saints' names on the side panels.

The central panel shows the Madonna enthroned with two angels and the child Jesus. The halo of the Madonna bears the Shahada written backwards. The left panel depicts Saint Bartholomew and Saint Blaise, and the right panel depicts Saint Anthony Abbot and Saint Juvenal (Giovenale). The left and right panels show a marked influence of 14th-century models, while the center panel's complex perspective has been something new for its time. Also, the use of three-dimensional solidity makes the painting revolutionary for its time.

== History ==
Masaccio painted the Triptych when he was 21 years old, probably commissioned by the family of Castellani or by that of Carnesecchi for the small church of San Giovenale, 2 km (1.2 mi) from the Romanic Church at Cascia di Reggello. The presence on the painting of the eponymous saint confirms its original location. Furthermore, the church is about 20 km from Castel San Giovanni in Altura (San Giovanni Valdarno), Masaccio's birthplace.

The Triptych remained in San Giovenale Church for centuries until its rediscovering in 1961. The work was in a state of poor preservation, and the first who took care of it was the art historian Luciano Berti. After 27 years, meanwhile kept in the superintendency's storage areas, it was placed in the Romanesque church of San Pietro a Cascia, and then in 2002, in the Museum of Sacred Art.

== See also ==
- List of major paintings by Masaccio
