= Holy Trinity (Masaccio) =

Fresco painting by Masaccio

Coordinates: 43°46′28″N 11°14′57″E

The Holy Trinity
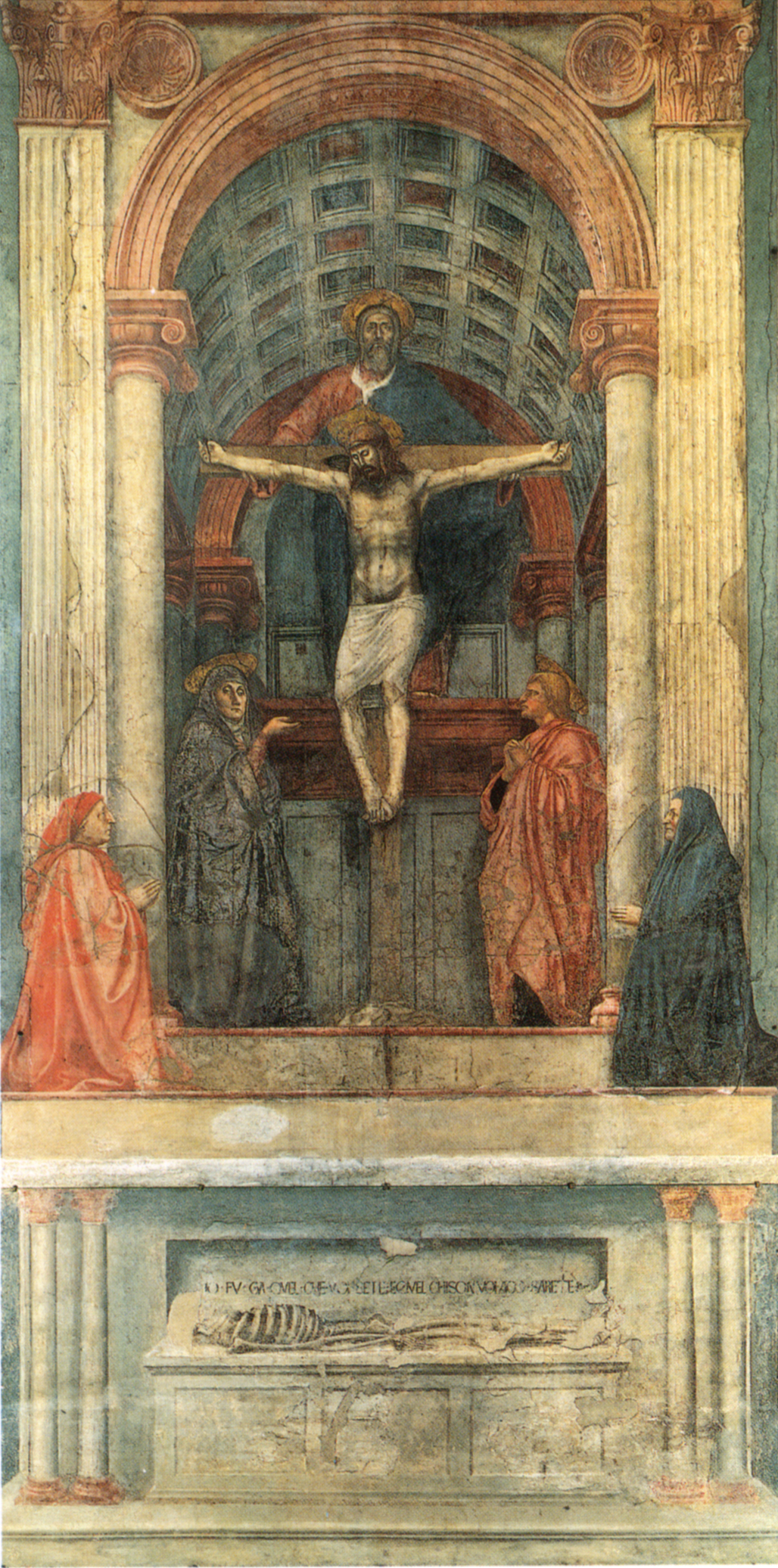
- Artist: Masaccio
- Year: c.1426-1428
- Medium: fresco
- Dimensions: 667 cm × 317 cm (263 in × 125 in)
- Location: Santa Maria Novella, Florence
- Website: www.smn.it/en/artworks/masaccios-holy-trinity/

The Holy Trinity, with the Virgin and Saint John and donors (Italian: Santa Trinità) is a fresco by the Italian Renaissance artist Masaccio in the Dominican church of Santa Maria Novella, in Florence. The fresco was among Masaccio's last major commissions and is often cited as one of the first monumental Renaissance paintings to utilize linear perspective.

== History ==
Masaccio created The Holy Trinity between 1425–1426. He died in late 1428 at the age of 26, or having just turned 27, leaving behind a relatively small body of work.

=== Location ===
The fresco is located along the middle of the basilica's left aisle. Although the configuration of this space has changed since the artwork was created, there are clear indications that the fresco was aligned very precisely in relationship with the sight-lines and perspective arrangement of the room at the time; particularly a former entrance-way facing the painting; in order to enhance the trompe-l'œil effect. There was also an altar, mounted as a shelf-ledge between the upper and lower sections of the fresco, further emphasizing the "reality" of the artifice.

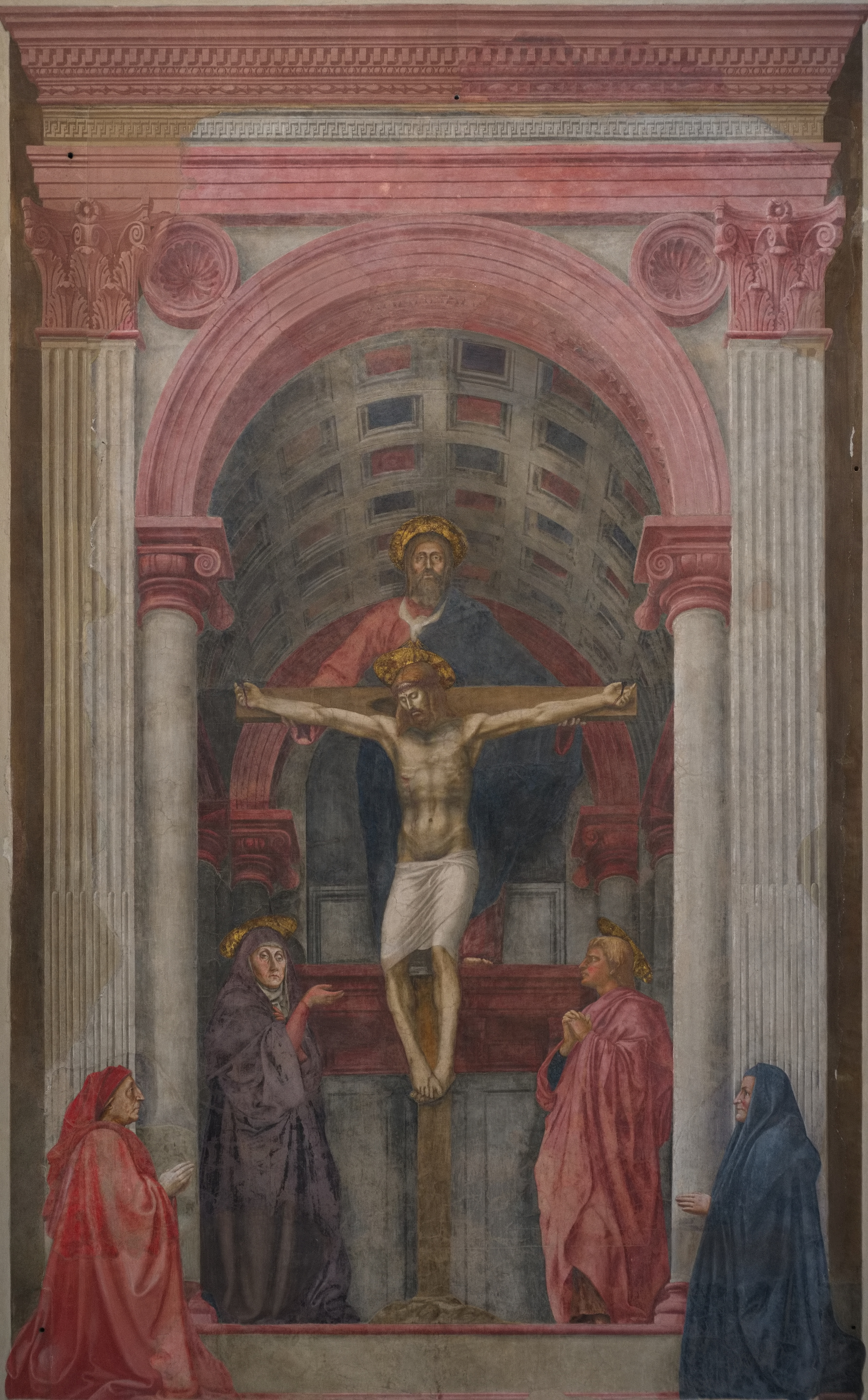
Holy Trinity, upper part

=== Commissioners and donors ===
Not much is known about the details of the commission; no contemporaneous documents naming the altar-piece's patron(s) have been found. The two donor portraits included in the fresco, one figure kneeling on either side of the archway, have not been positively identified. The persons depicted are almost certainly contemporary Florentines; either the persons who funded the work, or relatives or close associates. According to the established conventions of such depictions, it is generally, but not universally, assumed that they were probably still alive at the time of the artwork's commissioning.

The leading theories as to their identity favor two local families; either the Lenzi or, for at least one of the figures, a member of the Berti, who were a working-class family from the Santa Maria Novella quarter of Florence. Records of the Berti family, discovered in 2012, indicate that they owned a tomb at the foot of the fresco. Other sources mention a Lenzi tomb near the altar, with the inscription "Domenico di Lenzo, et Suorum 1426", as well as other Lenzi decorations in the chapel at that time, and theorize the donor portraits were posthumous images of Domenico (and his spouse?). In the Florentine dating system of that time, the new year began on March 25; and factoring in the conversion from Julian to Gregorian calendars Domenico's death, as recorded, would have been on 19 January 1427.

It has been hypothesized that Fra' Alessio Strozzi and/or Filippo Brunelleschi may have been involved, or at least consulted, in the creation of the Trinity. Brunelleschi's experiments in linear perspective likely were the inspiration for the perspectival construction of the painting. Fra' Alessio's involvement has been posited more on the matter of the appropriate depiction of the Holy Trinity, according to the preferences and sensibilities of the Dominican order. However, there is, to date, no concrete evidence for the direct involvement of either of these two men.

=== Giorgio Vasari and Cosimo I ===
Around 1568, Cosimo I, then Duke of Florence, commissioned Giorgio Vasari to undertake extensive renovation work at Santa Maria Novella, including reconfiguring and redecorating the area where Masaccio's fresco was located.

Vasari had already written favorably about Masaccio in his Vite. When it came time to implement the planned renovations of the chapel containing Trinity, circa 1570, Vasari chose to leave the fresco intact and construct a new altar and screen in front of Masaccio's painting, leaving a small gap, and effectively concealing and protecting the earlier work. While it seems plausible that it was Vasari's deliberate intention to preserve Masaccio's painting, it is unclear to what extent Duke Cosimo and/or other "concerned parties" were involved in this decision. To decorate the new altar, Vasari painted a Madonna of the Rosary; the image is extant, but has been moved to a different location within the church.

=== Rediscovery and subsequent history ===
Masaccio's Holy Trinity was rediscovered when Vasari's altar was dismantled during renovations in 1860. The Crucifixion, the upper part of the fresco, was subsequently transferred to canvas, and relocated to a different part of the church. It is unclear from available sources whether the lower section of the fresco, the cadaver tomb, remained unknown or was deliberately omitted (and possibly plastered over) during the 1860s construction work.

Restoration was done to the Crucifixion section of the painting at that time, to replace missing areas of the design; mostly architectural details around the perimeter of the work. While the painting was in damaged condition when rediscovered, it is also likely that further damage was caused by the transfer from plaster to canvas.

In the 20th century, the cadaver tomb portion of the work was rediscovered in situ, and the two halves were re-united in their original location in 1952. Leonetto Tintori undertook restoration work on the combined whole during 1950–1954.

Charles de Tolnay believed that the lower part of the fresco did not match the upper part in terms of style. Other experts assumed later changes in part of the painting or the loss of some parts, which creates the impression of fragmentation.

== Description ==
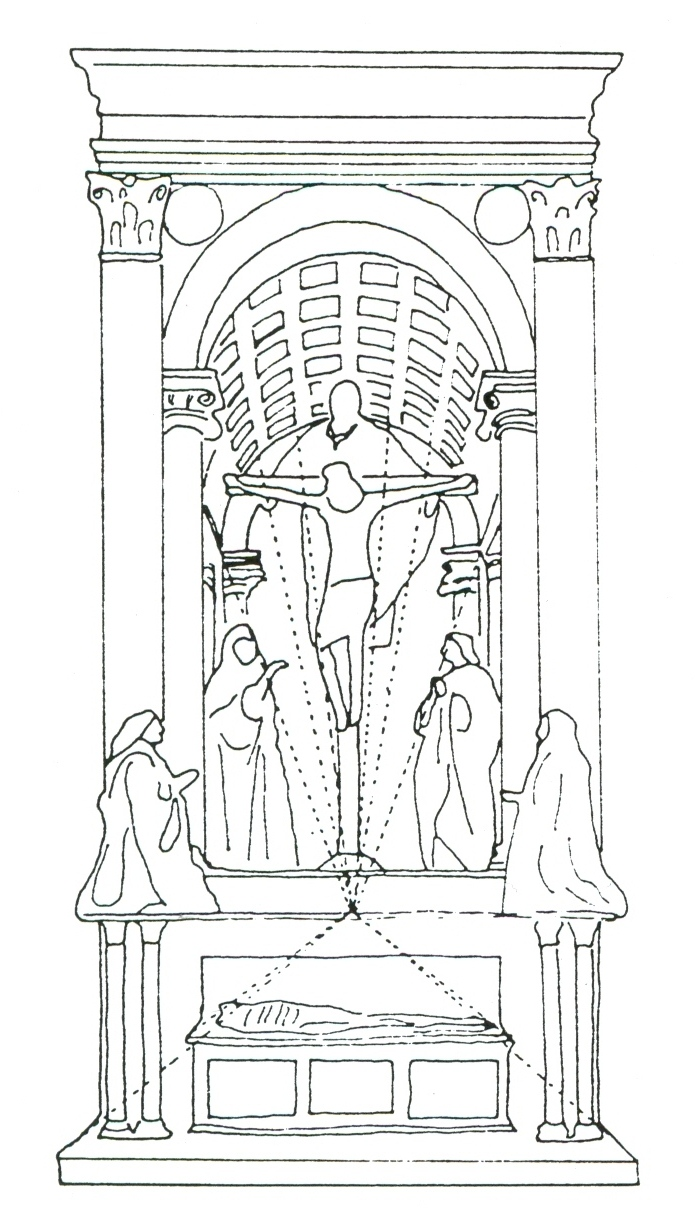
(note that this line-drawing does not include adequate spacing for the altar-ledge between upper and lower sections)

=== Dimensions ===
The painting is approximately 317 cm (125 in) wide, and 667 cm (263 in) high. This gives an overall vertical-to-horizontal proportion of about 2:1. The ratio between the upper and lower sections of the work is very roughly 3:1.

=== Altar ===
Originally, the design included an actual ledge, used as an altar, physically projecting outward from the now-blank band between the upper and lower sections of the fresco; further enhancing the sense of depth and reality in the work. Constructed as a pillared-shelf ~5 ft. above the floor, and estimated to be about 60 cm. wide, the altar-table's appearance would have been intended to match and/or complement the painted architecture. Its facing-edge and upper surface integrating with the fresco's steps and archway; and its supporting pillars, both real and illusory, combining with the shadows caused by the over-hang to create a crypt-like effect for the tomb beneath. The upper section of the fresco still retains traces of candle-smoke and heat-effects from use of this altar.

=== Figures ===
The painted figures are roughly life-sized. For an adult of average height facing the painting, the line of sight would have been slightly above 'ground-level' in the work; with Death in the form of the crypt and skeleton directly front of them, and the promise of Salvation above.

The architectural details painted on the wall (cornice, archivolts of arches, capitals) are brightly painted. The figures of the donors are located at the level of the viewer’s horizon and they are depicted from the perspective from below, and then, rising, the figures increase in size, according to their symbolic meaning, at the same time, as it were, moving deeper into the space of an imaginary chapel, the coffered vault of which is given in a strong perspective from below. The sarcophagus with the skeleton, although it occupies the lower part of the composition, on the contrary, is visible from above, as if located in a crypt under the floor of the church.

=== Damaging and restoring ===
Over the course of time and events (see above), the fresco has been damaged and subsequently restored. Much of the outer edge of the upper section, mainly architectural detail, is replacement work. Some regions of "new" paint can be clearly identified by differences in colour, visual texture and detail; and in certain places, by apparent "cracks" along the boundary between the original fresco surface, and areas of the design where the original surface is entirely absent and was repainted.

=== Lower section ===
The lower section, which depicts a skeleton in a tomb as a memento mori, has also lost significant paint. By this time^{Ref?}, "standard practice" in restoration had become more conservative, with a stronger emphasis on preserving and revealing the authentic work of the original artist; whereas earlier restorations tended to have more focus on producing an aesthetically pleasing "recreation" of the artwork.

=== Notable characteristics ===
The Trinity is noteworthy for its inspiration taken from ancient Roman triumphal arches and the strict adherence to recently developed perspective techniques, with a vanishing point at the viewer's eye level, so that, as Vasari describes it "a barrel vault drawn in perspective, and divided into squares with rosettes that diminish and are foreshortened so well that there seems to be a hole in the wall." The effect of the correct perspectival projection may be called trompe-l'œil, which means "deceives the eye," in French.

The fresco had a transforming effect on generations of Florentine painters and visiting artists. The sole figure without a fully realized three-dimensional occupation of space is God supporting the Cross, considered an immeasurable being. The kneeling patrons represent another important novelty, occupying the viewer's own space, "in front of" the picture plane, which is represented by the Ionic columns and the Corinthian pilasters from which the feigned vault appears to spring; they are depicted in the traditional prayerful pose of donor portraits, but on the same scale as the central figures, rather than the more usual 'diminution', and with noteworthy attention to realism and volume.

Masaccio placed the horizon line across the floor between the two donors. Orthogonal lines fan geometrically upward and outward into what becomes the angles and dimensions of the slightly diagonal lines of the coffers of the barrel vault. His use of linear perspective gives the illusion of realistic three-dimensional space.

As far as can be determined from available records, at the time when this painting was created no large-scale Roman-style coffered barrel vault, Triumphal arch or otherwise, had been constructed in Western Christendom since late antiquity.

== Interpretation ==
External videos
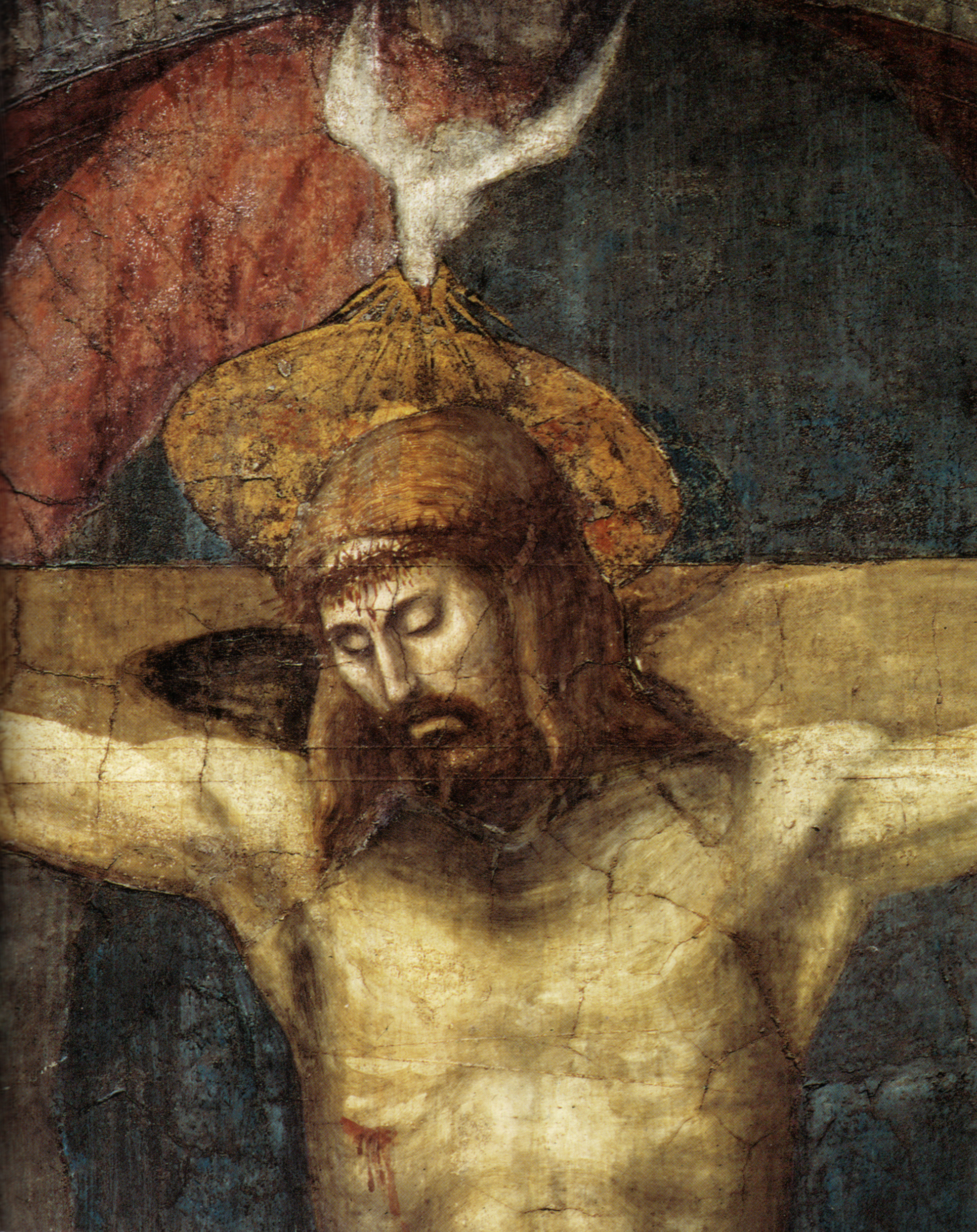
- Masaccio's Holy Trinity, Smarthistory
- Empire of the Eye: The Magic of Illusion: The Trinity-Masaccio, Part 2, National Gallery of Art, Washington

Masaccio's fresco is a sacra conversazione, a popular type of Renaissance religious imagery that portrayed contemporary people in scenes with holy or sacred figures. Most scholars have seen it as a traditional kind of image, intended for personal devotions and commemorations of the dead, although explanations of how the painting reflects these functions differ in their details. The iconography of the Trinity, flanked by Mary and John or including donors, is not uncommon in Italian art of the late 14th and early 15th centuries, and the association of the Trinity with a tomb also has precedents. No precedent for the exact iconography of Masaccio's fresco, combining all these elements, has been discovered, however.

The figures of the two patrons have most often been identified as members of the Lenzi family or, more recently, a member of the Berti family of the Santa Maria Novella quarter of Florence. They serve as models of religious devotion for viewers but, because they are located closer to the sacred figures than the viewers are, they also lay claim to special status.

The cadaver tomb consists of a sarcophagus on which lies a skeleton. "Carved" in the wall above the skeleton is an inscription: "IO FU[I] G[I]A QUEL CHE VOI S[I]ETE E QUEL CH['] I[O] SONO VO[I] A[N]CO[R] SARETE" (I once was what you are and what I am you also will be). This memento mori underlines that the painting was intended to serve as a lesson to the viewers. At the simplest level the imagery must have suggested to the 15th-century faithful that, since they all would die, only their faith in the Trinity and Christ's sacrifice would allow them to overcome their transitory existences.

According to American art historian Mary McCarthy:

The fresco, with its terrible logic, is like a proof in philosophy or mathematics, God the Father, with His unrelenting eyes, being the axiom from which everything else irrevocably flows.

== See also ==
- List of major paintings by Masaccio

== Notes ==
Includes material taken from the Italian wikipedia version of this article
