= Virgin and Child with Saint Anne (Masaccio) =

Painting by Masaccio

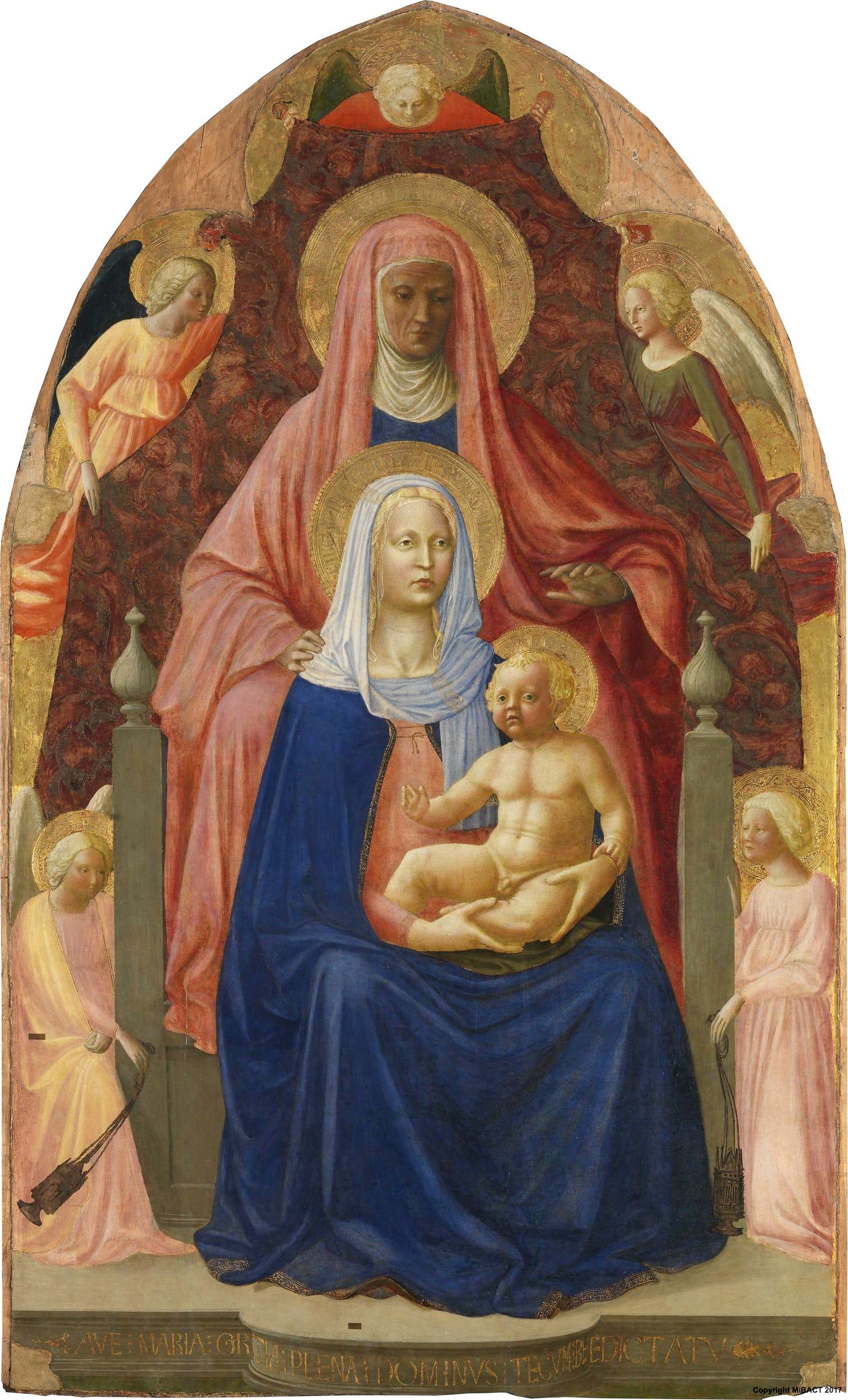
- Artist: Masaccio and Masolino da Panicale
- Year: c. 1424–1425
- Medium: Tempera on panel
- Dimensions: 175 cm × 103 cm (69 in × 41 in)
- Location: Uffizi, Florence

The Virgin and Child with Saint Anne, also known as Sant'Anna Metterza, is a painting of c. 1424–1425 by the Italian Renaissance painter Masaccio, probably in collaboration with Masolino da Panicale. The painting is in the Galleria degli Uffizi in Florence, Italy, and measures 175 centimetres high and 103 centimetres wide.

The Virgin and Child, with its powerful volume and solid possession of space by means of an assured perspectival structure, is one of the earliest works credited to Masaccio. Except for one, the angels, very delicate in their tender forms and pale, gentle colouring, are from the more Gothic brush of Masolino; the angel in the upper right hand curve reveals the hand of Masaccio. The figure of Saint Anne is much worn and hence to be judged with difficulty, but her hand, which seems to explore the depth of the picture-space, may well be an invention of Masaccio. Masaccio's work shows the influence of Donatello in its soft, rounded forms and realistic texture.

The work was originally commissioned for the church of Sant'Ambrogio in Florence. According to Giorgio Vasari, "It was placed in the chapel door which leads to the nuns' parlour".

The figure of Christ is that of a young child, a realistic presence, rather than a gothic cherub. This is also one of the first paintings to display the effect of true natural light on the figure; it is this invention which imparts the modelling of form so characteristic of Masaccio, and which would have a profound influence on the painting of the Italian Renaissance.

== See also ==
- List of major paintings by Masaccio
