= Profile Portrait of a Young Man =

Painting by an unknown 15th century Florentine painter

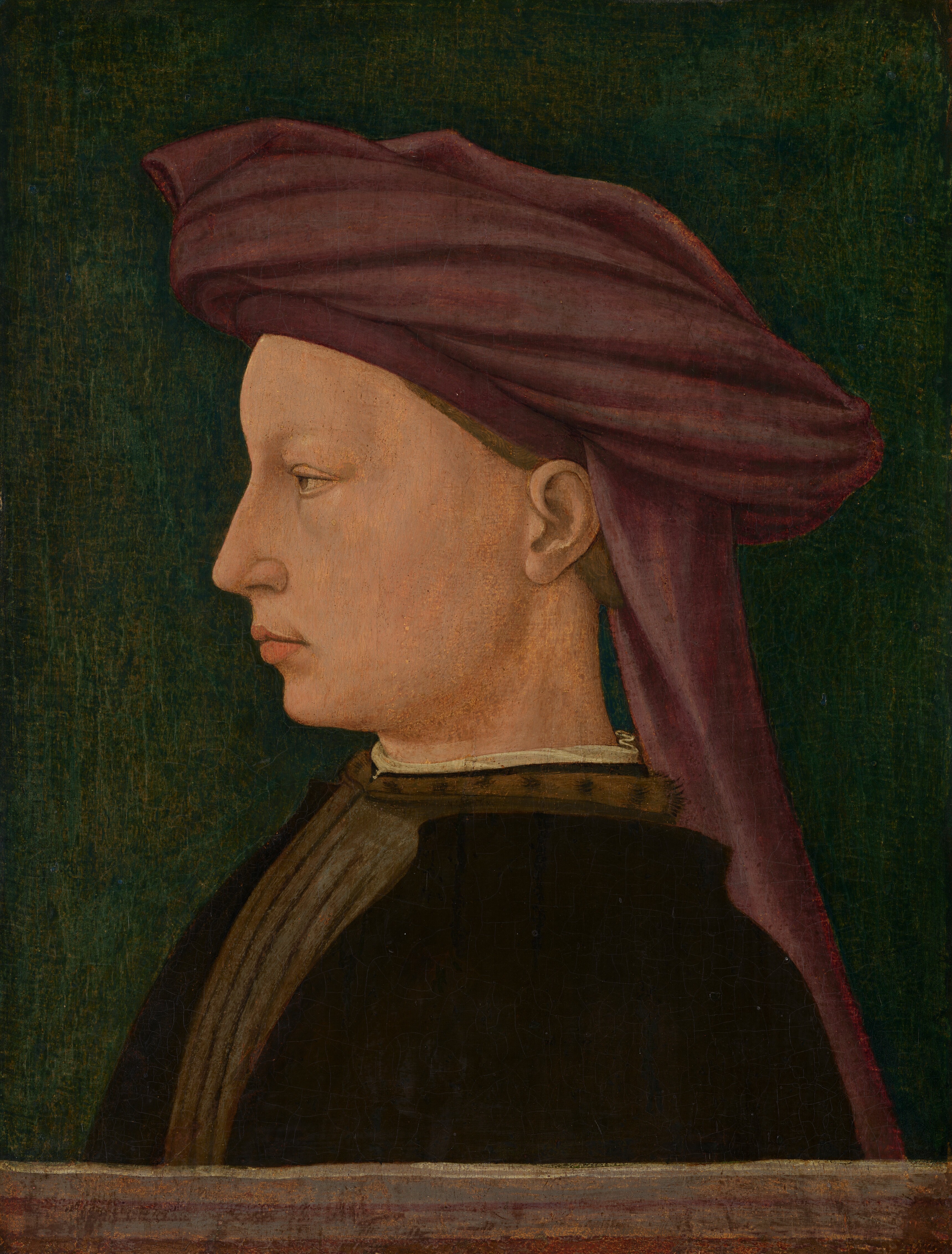
- Artist: unknown 15th century Florentine artist
- Year: 1430–1450
- Type: Tempera on panel
- Dimensions: 42.4 cm × 32.5 cm (16.7 in × 12.8 in)
- Location: National Gallery of Art, Washington, D.C.

Portrait of a Young Man is a painting by an unknown 15th-century Florentine artist, sometimes attributed to Masaccio. The identity of the chaperon-wearing subject of this painting is unknown. The portrait is currently displayed in the National Gallery of Art in Washington, D.C.

== See also ==
- List of major paintings by Masaccio
