= Masaccio =

Italian Renaissance painter (1401–1428)

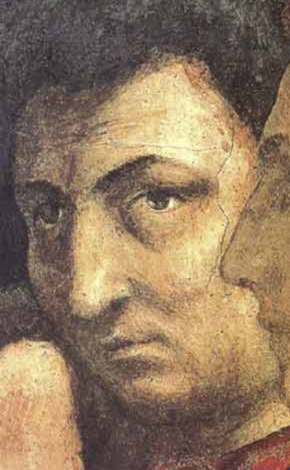
- Detail of St. Peter Raising the Son of Theophilus and St. Peter Enthroned as First Bishop of Antioch, Brancacci Chapel, S. Maria del Carmine, Florence
- Born: Tommaso di Ser Giovanni di Simone Cassai; December 21, 1401; San Giovanni Valdarno, Republic of Florence
- Died: latter half of 1428 (aged 26); Rome, Papal States
- Known for: Painting, fresco
- Notable work: Brancacci Chapel (Expulsion from the Garden of Eden, Tribute Money) c. 1425–28; Pisa Altarpiece 1426; Holy Trinity c. 1427
- Movement: Early Renaissance
- Patrons: Felice de Michele Brancacci ser Giuliano di Colino degli Scarsi da San Giusto

Tommaso di Ser Giovanni di Simone Cassai (December 21, 1401 – summer 1428), known as Masaccio (UK: /mæˈsætʃioʊ/, US: /məˈsɑːtʃioʊ, məˈzɑːtʃ(i)oʊ/; Italian: [maˈzattʃo]), was a Florentine artist who is regarded as the first great Italian painter of the Quattrocento period of the Italian Renaissance. According to Vasari, Masaccio was the best painter of his generation because of his skill at imitating nature, recreating lifelike figures and movements as well as a convincing sense of three-dimensionality. He employed nudes and foreshortenings in his figures. This had seldom been done before him.

The name Masaccio is a humorous version of Maso (short for Tommaso), meaning "clumsy" or "messy" Tom. The name may have been created to distinguish him from his principal collaborator, also called Maso, who came to be known as Masolino ("little/delicate Tom").

Despite his brief career, he had a profound influence on other artists and is considered to have started the Early Italian Renaissance in painting with his works in the mid- and late-1420s. He was one of the first to use linear perspective in his painting, employing techniques such as vanishing point in art for the first time. He moved away from the International Gothic style and elaborate ornamentation of artists like Gentile da Fabriano to a more naturalistic mode that employed perspective and chiaroscuro for greater realism.

Masaccio died at the age of twenty-six and little is known about the exact circumstances of his death. Upon hearing of Masaccio's death, Filippo Brunelleschi said: "We have suffered a great loss."

== Early life ==
Masaccio was born to Giovanni di Simone "Mone" Cassai and Jacopa di Martinozzo in Castel San Giovanni di Altura, now San Giovanni Valdarno (today part of the province of Arezzo, Tuscany). His father was a notary and his mother the daughter of an innkeeper of Barberino di Mugello, a town a few miles north of Florence. His family name, Cassai, comes from the trade of his paternal grandfather Simone and granduncle Lorenzo, who were carpenters/cabinet makers (casse, hence cassai). Masaccio's father died in 1406, when he was only five; later that same year a brother was born, named Giovanni (1406–1486) after his father. He also was to become a painter, with the nickname of Lo Scheggia meaning "the splinter". In 1412 Monna Jacopa married an elderly apothecary, Tedesco di maestro Feo, who already had several daughters, one of whom grew up to marry the only other documented painter from Castel San Giovanni, Mariotto di Cristofano (1393–1457).

There is no evidence for Masaccio's artistic education; however, Renaissance painters traditionally began an apprenticeship with an established master around the age of 12. Masaccio would likely have had to move to Florence to receive his training, but he was not documented in the city until he joined the painters guild (the Arte de' Medici e Speziali) as an independent master on January 7, 1422, signing as "Masus S. Johannis Simonis pictor populi S. Nicholae de Florentia."

== First works ==
The first works attributed to Masaccio are the San Giovenale Triptych (1422), now in the Masaccio Museum of Sacred Art in Cascia di Reggello near Florence, and the Virgin and Child with Saint Anne (Sant'Anna Metterza) (c. 1424) at the Uffizi.

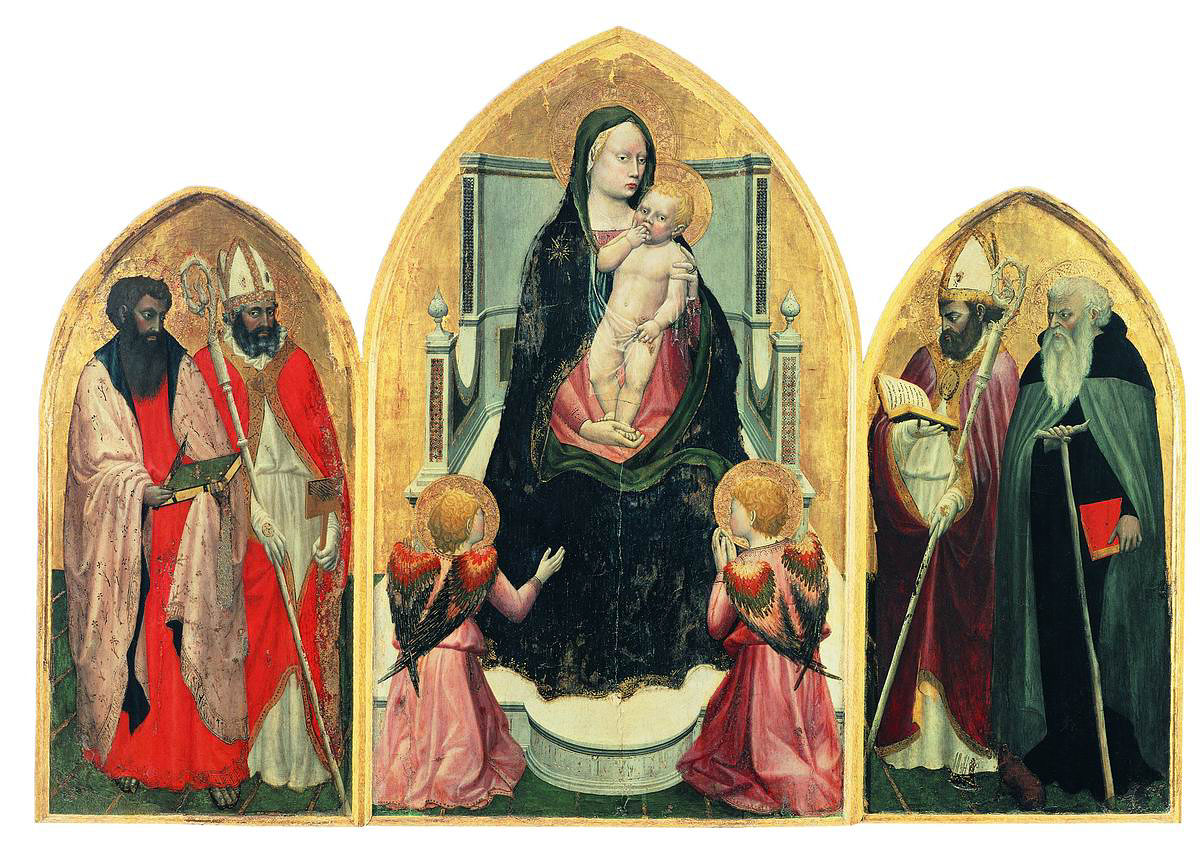
San Giovenale Triptych (1422)

The San Giovenale altarpiece was discovered in 1961 in the church of San Giovenale at Cascia di Reggello, very close to Masaccio's hometown. It depicts the Virgin and Child with angels in the central panel, Sts. Bartholomew and Blaise on the left panel, and Sts. Juvenal (i.e. San Giovenale) and Anthony Abbot in the right panel. The painting has lost much of its original framing, and its surface is badly abraded. Nevertheless, Masaccio's concern to suggest three-dimensionality through volumetric figures and foreshortened forms is apparent, and stands as a revival of Giotto's approach, rather than a continuation of contemporary trends.

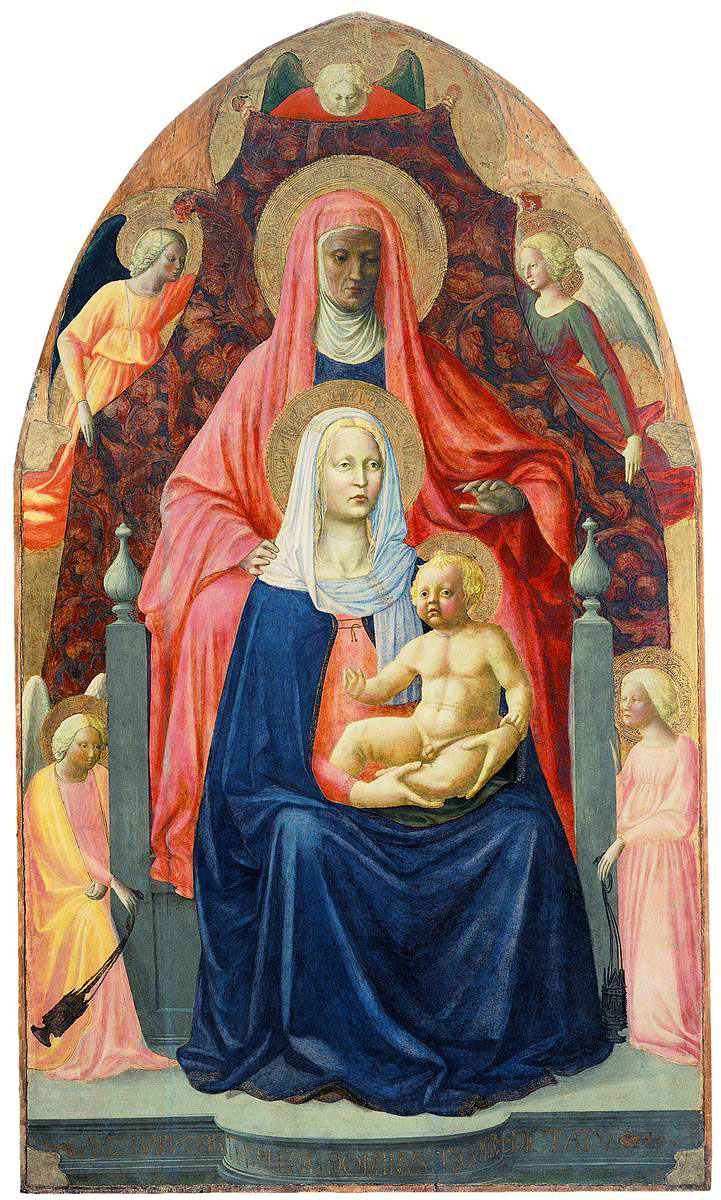
Masolino & Masaccio, Virgin and Child with Saint Anne (c. 1424), Uffizi

The second work was perhaps Masaccio's first collaboration with the older and already-renowned artist, Masolino da Panicale (1383/4–c. 1436). The circumstances of the two artists' collaboration are unclear; since Masolino was considerably older, it seems likely that he brought Masaccio under his wing, but the division of hands in the Virgin and Child with Saint Anne is so marked that it is hard to see the older artist as the controlling figure in this commission. Masolino is believed to have painted the figure of St. Anne and the angels that hold the cloth of honor behind her, while Masaccio painted the more important Virgin and Child on their throne. Masolino's figures are delicate, graceful and somewhat flat, while Masaccio's are solid and hefty.

== Maturity ==
In Florence, Masaccio could study the works of Giotto and become friends with Brunelleschi and Donatello. According to Vasari, at their prompting in 1423 Masaccio travelled to Rome with Masolino: from that point he was freed of all Gothic and Byzantine influence, as seen in his altarpiece for the Carmelite Church in Pisa. The traces of influences from ancient Roman and Greek art that are present in some of Masaccio's works presumably originated from this trip: they should also have been present in a lost Sagra, (today known through some drawings, including one by Michelangelo), a fresco commissioned for the consecration ceremony of the church of Santa Maria del Carmine in Florence (April 19, 1422). It was destroyed when the church's cloister was rebuilt at the end of the 16th century.

== Brancacci Chapel ==
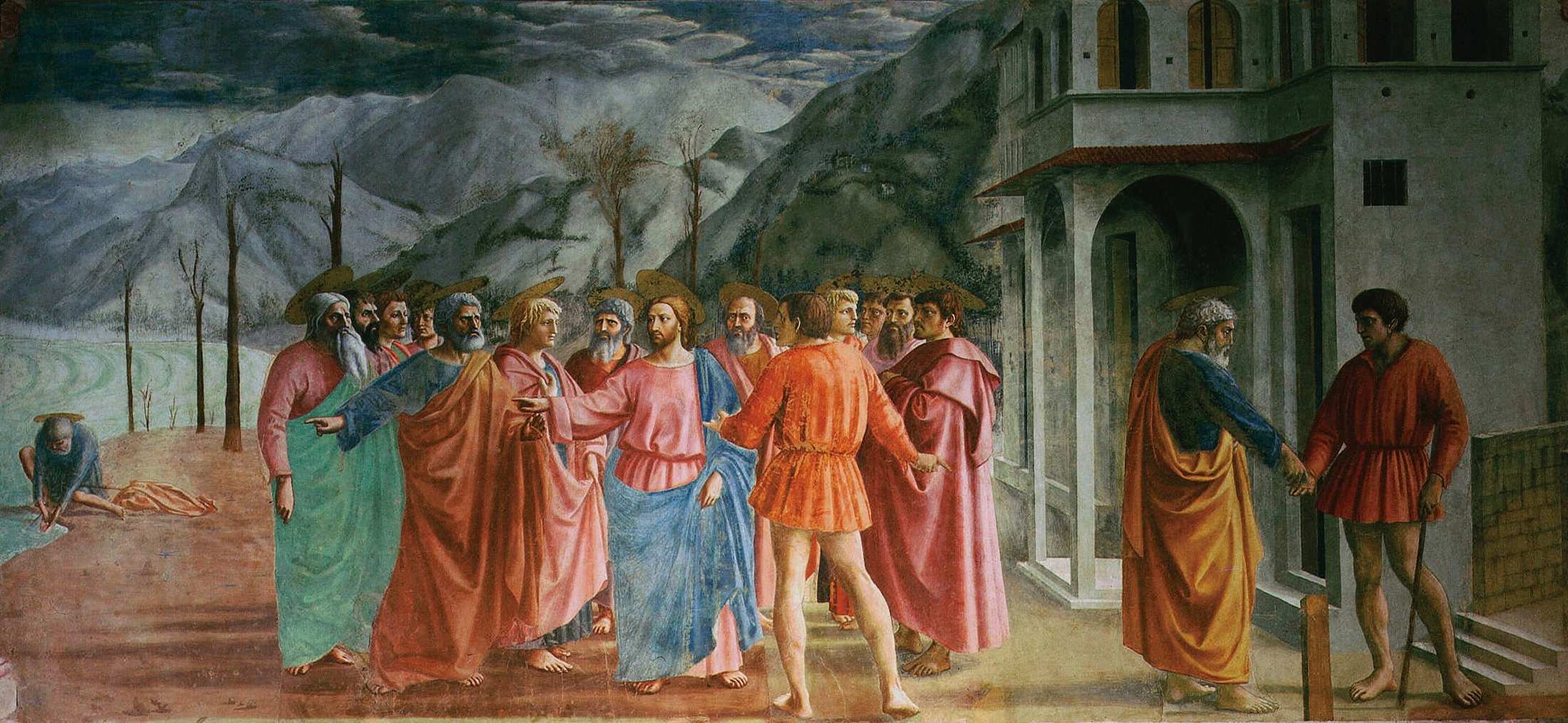
The Tribute Money, fresco in the Brancacci Chapel in Santa Maria del Carmine, Florence

In 1424, the "duo preciso e noto" ("well and known duo") of Masaccio and Masolino was commissioned by the powerful and wealthy Felice Brancacci to execute a cycle of frescoes for the Brancacci Chapel in the church of Santa Maria del Carmine in Florence. With the two artists probably working simultaneously, the painting began around 1425, but for unknown reasons the chapel was left unfinished, and was completed by Filippino Lippi in the 1480s. The iconography of the fresco decoration is somewhat unusual; while the majority of the frescoes represent the life of St. Peter, two scenes, on either side of the threshold of the chapel space, depict the temptation and expulsion of Adam and Eve. As a whole, the frescoes recount the life of St Peter as if it were the story of salvation. The style of Masaccio's scenes shows the influence of Giotto especially. Figures are large, heavy, and solid; emotions are expressed through faces and gestures; and there is a strong impression of naturalism throughout the paintings. Unlike Giotto, however, Masaccio uses linear and atmospheric perspective, directional light, and chiaroscuro, which is the representation of form through light and color without outlines. As a result, his frescoes are even more convincingly lifelike than those of his trecento predecessor.

=== Works of the chapel ===
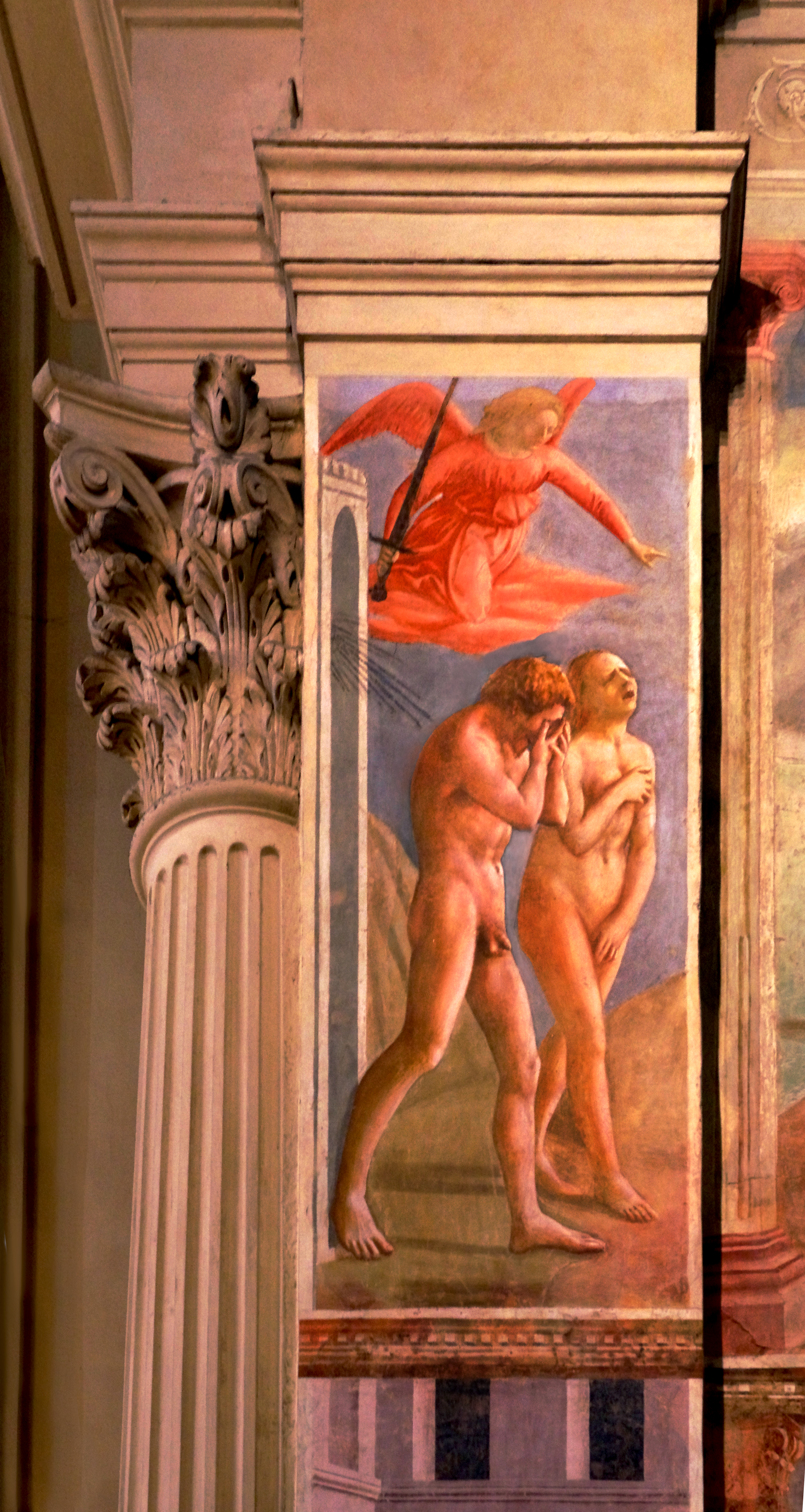
Masaccio's fresco of The Expulsion (1426–1427)

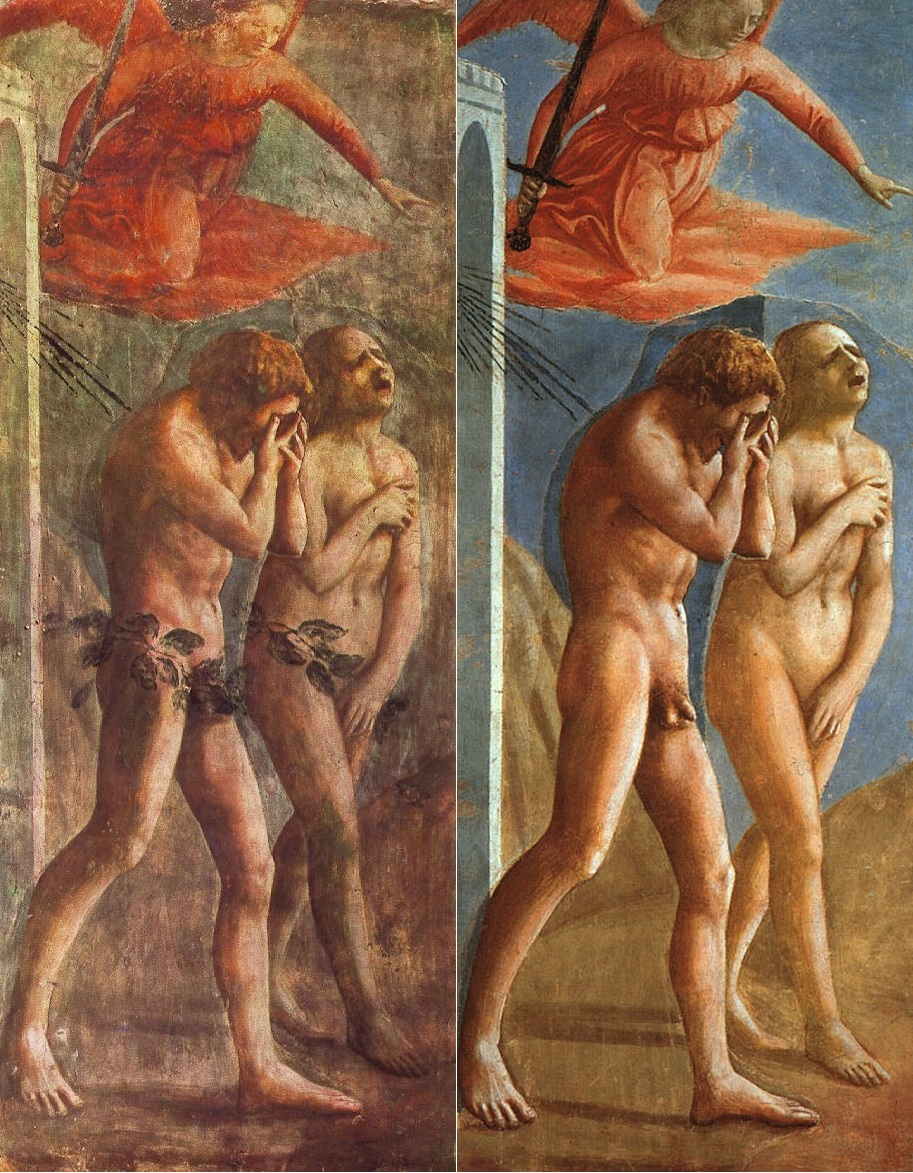
When it was cleaned in the 1980s, the added fig leaves were removed.

The Expulsion from the Garden of Eden, depicts a distressed Adam and Eve, chased from the garden by a threatening angel. Adam covers his entire face to express his shame, while Eve covers her breasts and groin. The fresco had a huge influence on Michelangelo and his work. Another major work is The Tribute Money in which Jesus and the Apostles are depicted as neo-classical archetypes. Scholars have often noted that the shadows of the figures all fall away from the chapel window, as if the figures are lit by it; this is an added stroke of verisimilitude and further tribute to Masaccio's innovative genius. In the Resurrection of the Son of Theophilus, he painted a pavement in perspective, framed by large buildings to obtain a three-dimensional space in which the figures are placed proportionate to their surroundings. In this he was a pioneer in applying the newly discovered rules of perspective.

In September 1425 Masolino left the work and went to Hungary. It is not known if this was because of money quarrels with Felice or an artistic divergence with Masaccio. It has also been supposed that Masolino planned this trip from the very beginning, and needed a close collaborator who could continue the work after his departure. But Masaccio left the frescoes unfinished in 1426 in order to respond to other commissions, probably coming from the same patron. However, it has also been suggested that the declining finances of Felice Brancacci were insufficient to pay for any further work, so the painter sought work elsewhere.

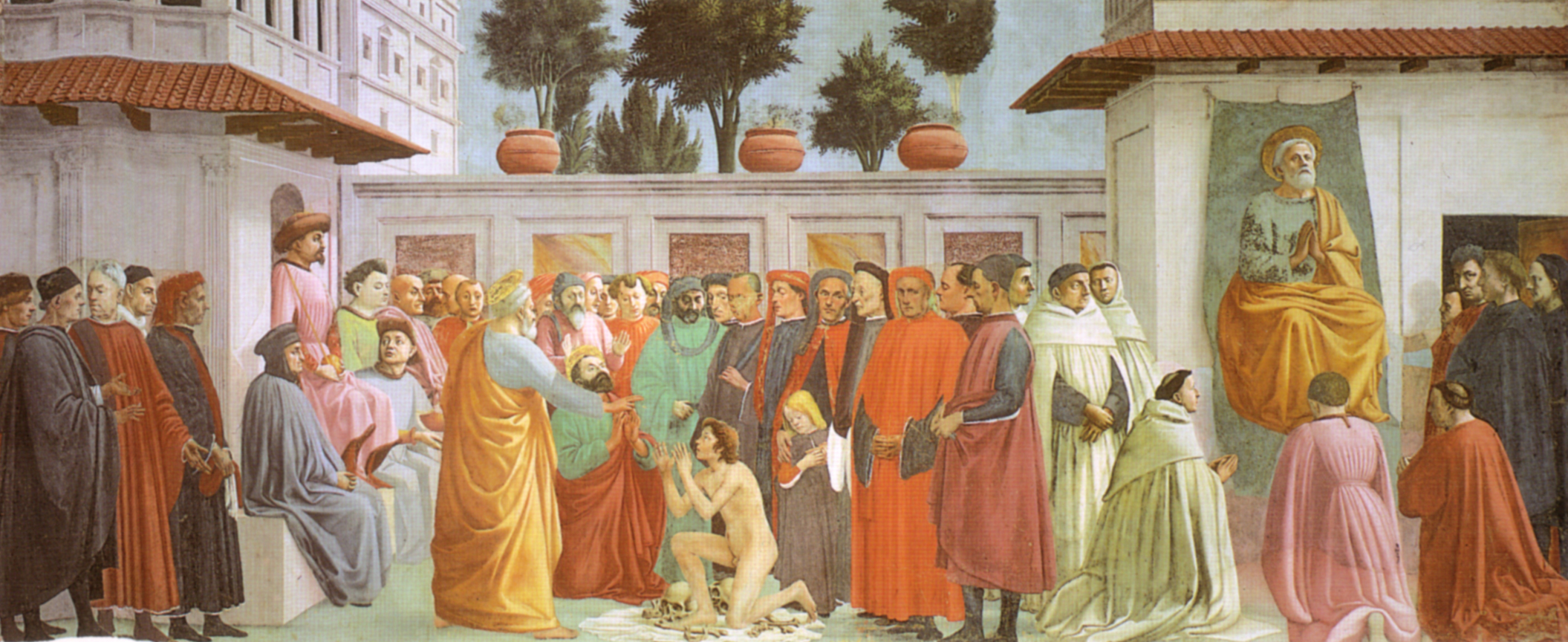
Raising of the Son of Theophilus of Antioch, containing self-portrait of Masaccio (third from right)

Masaccio returned in 1427 to work again in the Carmine, beginning the Resurrection of the Son of Theophilus, but apparently left it, too, unfinished, although it has been suggested that the painting was severely damaged later in the century because it had contained portraits of the Brancacci family, at that time excoriated as enemies of the Medici. This painting was either restored or completed more than fifty years later by Filippino Lippi.

Some of the scenes completed by Masaccio and Masolino were lost in a fire in 1771; we know about them only through Vasari's biography. The surviving parts were extensively blackened by smoke. In the twentieth century, the removal of marble slabs covering two areas of the paintings revealed the original appearance of the work.

== Pisa Altarpiece ==
On February 19, 1426, Masaccio was commissioned by Giuliano di Colino degli Scarsi da San Giusto, for the sum of 80 florins, to paint a major altarpiece, the Pisa Altarpiece, for his chapel in the church of Santa Maria del Carmine in Pisa. The work was dismantled and dispersed in the 18th century, and only eleven of about twenty original panels have been rediscovered in various collections around the world. The central panel of the altarpiece (The Madonna and Child) is now in the National Gallery, London. Although it is very damaged, the work features a sculptural and human Madonna as well as a convincing perspectival depiction of her throne. Masaccio probably worked on it entirely in Pisa, shuttling back and forth to Florence, where he was still working on the Brancacci Chapel. In these years, Donatello was also working in Pisa at a monument for Cardinal Rinaldo Brancacci, to be sent to Naples. It is suggested that Masaccio's first ventures in plasticity and perspective were based on Donatello's sculpture, before he could study Brunelleschi's more scientific approach to perspective.

== Holy Trinity ==
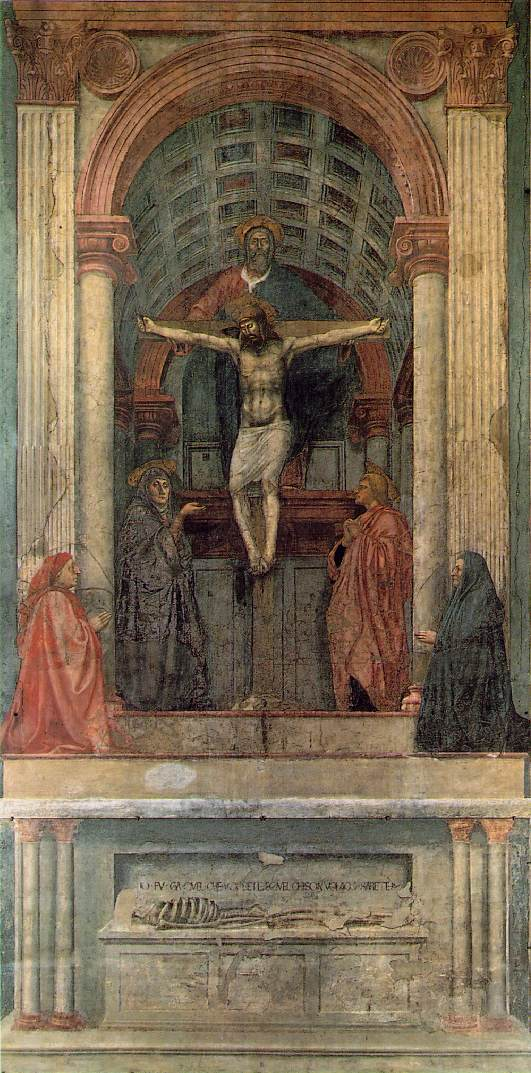
Holy Trinity, in full: Trinity with the Virgin, Saint John the Evangelist, and Donors (c. 1427) – Fresco, Santa Maria Novella, Florence

Around 1427 Masaccio won a prestigious commission to produce a Holy Trinity for the Dominican church of Santa Maria Novella in Florence. No contemporary documents record the patron of the fresco, but recently references to ownership of a tomb at the foot of the fresco have been found in the records of the Berti family of the Santa Maria Novella Quarter of Florence; this working-class family expressed a long-standing devotion to the Trinity, and may well have commissioned Masaccio's painting. Probably it is the male patron who is represented to the left of the Virgin in the painting, while his wife is right of St. John the Evangelist. The fresco, considered by many to be Masaccio's masterwork, is the earliest surviving painting to use systematic linear perspective, possibly devised by Masaccio with the assistance of Brunelleschi.

According to the reconstruction Masaccio started by producing a rough drawing of the composition and perspective lines on the wall. The drawing was covered with fresh plaster for making the fresco. To ensure the precise transfer of the perspective lines from the sketch to the plaster, Masaccio inserted a nail at the vanishing point under the base of the cross and attached strings to it, which he pressed in (or carved into) the plaster. The marks of the preparatory works are still visible.

The sacred figures and the donors are represented above an image of a skeleton lying on a sarcophagus. An inscription seemingly carved into the wall above the skeleton reads: "Io fui gia quel che voi siete e quel ch'io sono voi anco sarete" (I once was what now you are and what I am, you shall yet be). This skeleton is both a reference to Adam, whose sin brought humans to death, and a reminder to viewers that their time on earth is transitory. It is only through faith in the Trinity, the fresco suggests, that one overcomes this death. The Holy Spirit is seen in the form of a dove, above Jesus. The combination of trinity, death and decay "can be interpreted as a transposition of the Golgotha chapel" in the Church of the Holy Sepulchre in Jerusalem.

== Other paintings ==
Masaccio produced two other works, a Nativity and an Annunciation, now lost, before leaving for Rome, where his companion Masolino was frescoing a chapel with scenes from the life of St. Catherine in the Basilica di San Clemente. It has never been confirmed that Masaccio collaborated on that work, even though it is possible that he contributed to Masolino's polyptych for the altar of Santa Maria Maggiore with his panel portraying St. Jerome and St. John the Baptist, now in the National Gallery, London. Masaccio died at the end of 1428. According to a legend, he was poisoned by a jealous rival painter.

Only four frescoes undoubtedly from Masaccio's hand still exist today, although many other works have been at least partially attributed to him. Others are believed to have been destroyed.

== Legacy ==
Masaccio profoundly influenced the art of painting and is considered to have begun the Early Italian Renaissance in painting. He transformed the direction of Italian painting, moving it away from the idealizations of Gothic art, and, for the first time, presenting it as part of a more profound, natural, and humanist world. Moreover, Masaccio influenced a great many artists both while he was alive and posthumously. His influence is particularly notable in the works of Florentine minor masters, such as Andrea di Giusto, Giovanni dal Ponte, and others who attempted to replicate his glowing, lifelike forms, whilst in 1817 Auguste Couder produced The Death of Masaccio.

Vasari wrote in his Vite, emphasizing especially the importance of the Brancacci chapel:

All the most celebrated sculptors and painters from his time until now have studied his works in the Brancacci chapel, as Lionardo da Vinci, Perugino, the divine Michael Angelo, Raffaello da Urbino, Andrea del Sarto, and many more, and if I have not mentioned many Florentines and strangers who have gone to that chapel to study there, it is because where the heads of the art go, there the members are sure to follow. Yet although his works have always been held in such reputation, it is the firm belief of many that he would have brought forth much greater fruit if death - had not carried him off, at the age of twentysix, so suddenly...

== Main works ==
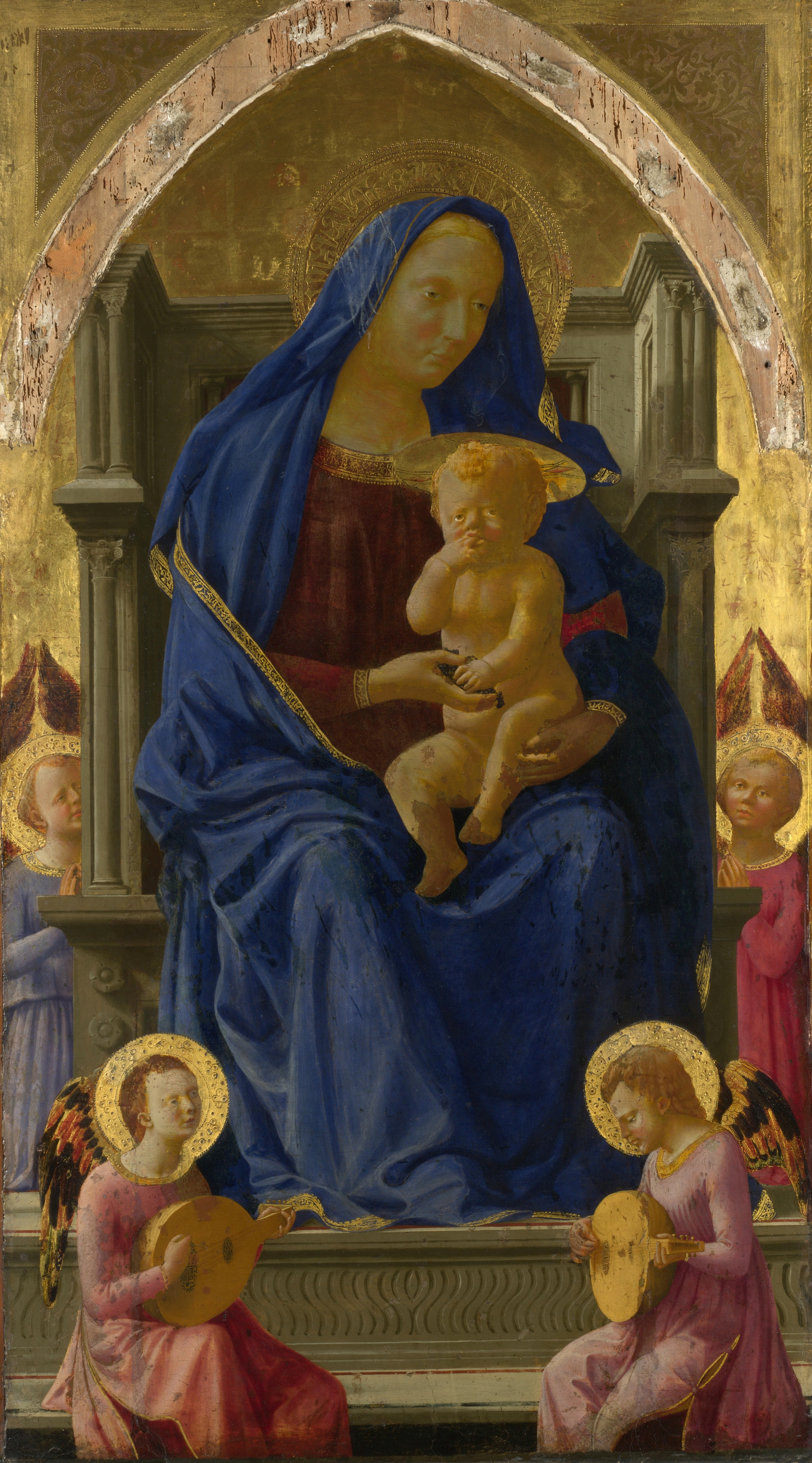
Virgin Mary with pseudo-Arabic halo, by Masaccio (1426).

- San Giovenale Triptych (1422) tempera on panel, 108 x 153 cm, Cascia di Reggello
- Madonna with Child (1424) – tempera on panel, 24 x 18 cm, Palazzo Vecchio, Florence
- Virgin and Child with Saint Anne (1424–1425) – tempera on panel, 175 x 103 cm, Uffizi, Florence
- The Tribute Money (1424–1428) – fresco, 247 x 597 cm, Brancacci Chapel, Florence
- Holy Trinity (1425–1428) – fresco, 667 x 317 cm, Santa Maria Novella, Florence
- Portrait of a Young Man (1425) – wood, National Gallery of Art, Washington, D.C.
- Madonna with Child and Angel (1426) – oil on table, National Gallery, London
- Crucifixion (c. 1426) – tempera on panel, 83 x 63 cm, Museo di Capodimonte, Naples
- St. Paul (1426) – tempera on panel, 51 x 30 cm, Museo Nazionale, Pisa
- St. Jerome and St. John the Baptist (c. 1426–1428) panel, 114 x 55 cm, National Gallery, London
- Nativity (Berlin Tondo) (1427–1428) – tempera on wood, diameter 56 cm, Staatliche Museen, Berlin
- St Andrew – oil on table, 51 x 31 cm, J. Paul Getty Museum, Los Angeles

== See also ==
- History of painting
- List of major paintings by Masaccio
- Western painting
