= List of major paintings by Masaccio =

External videos
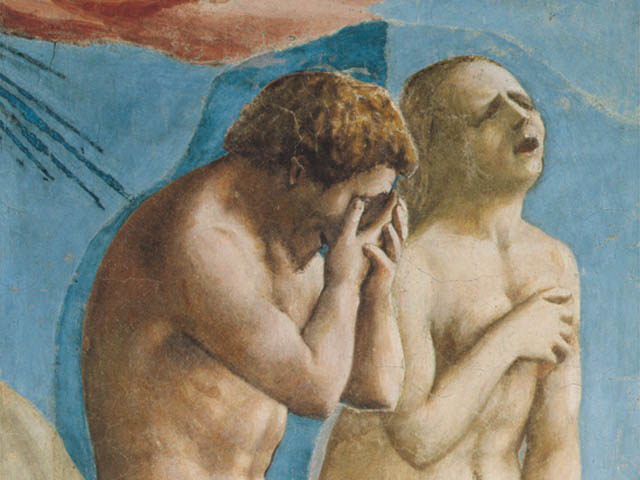
- Masaccio's Expulsion of Adam and Eve from Eden, Smarthistory

Masaccio was responsible for developing naturalistic depiction of 3D space containing figures. In his paintings the newly discovered laws of perspective were applied, the drawing of foreshortened parts was correct, and the anatomy of the human body was well understood. According to Giorgio Vasari, Masaccio owed his artistic education to Masolino da Panicale, but Masaccio, although he died 20 years before his master, carried the advance in naturalism further. Much of his work has been destroyed, and what remains is often in poor condition, but undergoing some restoration. The largest remaining collection of work is the fresco decoration of the Brancacci Chapel in the Church of Santa Maria del Carmine in Florence. Here Masolino da Panicale had left unfinished a series of frescoes which Masaccio was asked to continue: his six paintings there created a sensation and became the training school of Florentine painters of the succeeding generations, of Michelangelo with the rest. Masaccio did not complete the decoration of the chapel. In 1428 he left for Rome, and was reported dead soon afterwards.

What follows is an incomplete list of Masaccio's main paintings in chronological sequence. The arrangement is ordered by year and title, with brief comments and showing the artistic development of the artist.

== Gallery of paintings by Masaccio ==
Image	Year & Title	Comment
San Giovenale Triptych	1422 — San Giovenale Triptych	(Panel, 110 cm × 65 cm – central) — The San Giovenale altarpiece was only discovered in 1961 in the church of San Giovenale at Cascia di Reggello, which is very close to Masaccio's hometown. Now it's on display at the nearby Masaccio Museum of Sacred Art. It represents the Virgin and Child with angels in the central panel, Saints Bartholomew and Blaise on the left panel, and Saints Juvenal (i.e. San Giovenale) and Anthony Abbot in the right panel. The painting has lost much of its original framing, and its surface is damaged. Nevertheless, Masaccio's concern to suggest three-dimensionality through volumetric figures and foreshortened forms (a revival of Giotto's approach, rather than a continuation of contemporary trends) is already apparent.
Young man	1423–1425 — Portrait of a young man	(Wood, 42 cm × 32 cm) — An unknown wealthy young man with fashionable clothes and headgear, wearing a chaperon: the portrait shows an accurate sense of facial detail and general physical appearance. The lines are strong and well marked, the expression serious and pensive. The attribution to Masaccio, however, is disputed.
Madonna and Child with St Anna	1424 — Sant'Anna Metterza	(Tempera on panel, 175 cm × 103 cm) — Masaccio's first collaboration with the older and already-renowned artist, Masolino da Panicale (1383/4-c. 1436). The circumstances of the two artists' collaboration are unclear; since Masolino was considerably older, it seems likely that he brought Masaccio under his wing, but the division of hands in the Virgin and Child with Saint Anne is so marked – Masolino is believed to have painted the figure of St Anne and the angels that hold the cloth of honour behind her, while Masaccio painted the more important Virgin and Child on their throne – that it is hard to see the older artist as the controlling figure in this commission. Masolino's figures are delicate, graceful and somewhat flat, while Masaccio's are solid and hefty.
Madonna with Child and Angels	1426 — Madonna with Child and Four Angels	(Wood, 136 cm × 73 cm) — Representation of the Virgin Mary with a pseudo-Arabic halo, and baby Jesus, surrounded by four angels: the painting is badly damaged, the altarpiece having been cut up and sold in pieces long ago. The panel has a gold ground, with the Virgin seated on a throne with a lowered point of view, in order to take into account the viewer's real perspective; she bends down, as if to form a protective cocoon around the Child eating a grape, a symbol of his future Passion; the imposing figures are shaped by chiaroscuro. In many ways the style of the painting is traditional; the expensive gold background and ultramarine draperies of the Virgin, her enlarged scale, and her hierarchical presentation (ceremoniously enthroned) all fit within the late-medieval formulas for the representation of Mary and Jesus in glory. In other ways, however, the painting is a step away from International Gothic in the sense that Masaccio has created a more realistic approach to the subject: The faces are more realistic and not idealised.; The baby Jesus is less of a small man and more childlike.; An attempt at creating depth has been attempted by Massacio's placement of the two background angels and through the use of linear perspective in the throne.; Modeling is clearly visible as the light source is coming from the left of the painting.; The Madonna is a bulky figure, deriving from classical models, and her drapery has larger and more naturalistic folds that shape her body.
Crucifixion	1426 — Crucifixion	(Pisa Altarpiece – 83 cm × 63 cm) — A chapel in Santa Maria del Carmine in Pisa commissioned this altarpiece from Masaccio on 19 February 1426 for the sum of 80 florins. Payment for the work was recorded on 26 December of that year. The altarpiece was dismantled and dispersed in the 18th century, but an attempted reconstruction was made possible due to a detailed description of the work by Vasari. Eleven pieces have been found as of 2010, and they are insufficient to reliably reconstruct the whole work. The Crucifixion is one of the surviving panels connected with the Pisa Altarpiece. The Crucifixion was placed above the central panel of the altarpiece, which represented the Virgin enthroned with the baby Jesus on her lap, flanked by two pairs of angels. Although the panel unnaturalistically represents the narrative against a gold ground (a medieval formula for representing sacred scenes), Masaccio creates an effect of reality by depicting the event from below, as the viewer standing before the altar truly saw it. In this way, he attempts to tie the viewer to the scene, to make the sacred accessible to the ordinary Christian.
————————————	1426 — Adoration of the Magi	(Pisa Altarpiece – Predella panel, poplar 21 cm × 61 cm, tempera) — The painting formed part of the predella in the centre section, below the Madonna and Child today at the National Gallery. The scene, as is customary, is presented in a profile perspective and is quite static, like a frieze. At left the viewer sees the hut, the ox and the donkey from the back, next to a mount for the donkey. Then follows the Holy Family, with halos in foreshortened perspective. Mary is seated on a golden stool with protomes and lion paws (the faldstool with the imperial lion heads), and holds in her arms the Child blessing the first of the Magi already kneeling and without crown (placed on the ground); his gift is already in St Joseph's hands. Behind him is a second Magus with pink tunic (much like the character in the fresco of St Peter Healing the Sick with His Shadow in the Brancacci Chapel – see below, fig. 18); this Wise Man is also kneeling and his crown is held by a servant behind him. The third Magus is standing, his servant removing the crown while another nearby bears the gift. Behind the Magi are two emblematic figures, not taken from the traditional iconography, wearing fashionable headdress and long gray cloaks which leave uncovered their legs in red tights; probably they are representations of Masaccio's clients: the notary Ser Giuliano of Collino, taller and behind the first personage, likely his nephew, shorter and in the foreground, standing on a small mound. Finally, at right are the horses and servants. The artist's style is soft and mellow in the background, and strong and incisive elsewhere, as for instance in the capes of the two clients. The light and the rich colours unify the whole representation, without imbalances.
————————————	1426 — Crucifixion of St Peter and Martyrdom of St John the Baptist	(Pisa Altarpiece – Predella panel, poplar 21 cm × 61 cm) — The first scene (left) shows a close up of the cross with Saint Peter in the inverted position with legs apart. The saint is impassive (with his halo foreshortened in perspective) while undergoing the nailing of hands; behind are two characters and a number of guards lined up, slightly smaller than the figures in the foreground. All lines (legs, looks) align the viewer's attention on the figure of Peter. In the Baptist's scene (right), the prophet is resigned, ready to accept his martyrdom by kneeling and offering his neck to the blade while praying in silent grief. In front of him, a basket is ready to receive his severed head. The scene is completed by two young guards who look on behind their long shields (originally friezed with ornaments, but now almost completely erased). Masaccio in both scenes tried to represent the executioners' violence by not showing their faces and thus their human side. The work is also notable for the architectural setting, the scene framed by two side foothills recalling Rome, the city where the martyrdom took place, in particular the Pyramid of Cestius and the Meta Romuli, a pyramidal mausoleum still in existence in the 15th century in the vicinity of the Vatican: the two buildings were traditionally linked to Peter's martyrdom. The work is a complete example of space painted illusionistically, where all elements are arranged rationally by following a unifying principle, bound by a rigorous mathematical construction of the perspective. Space is quickened by the light, which gives substance and volume to every element, from the body of the saints to the stones of the pavement. U. Procacci: 'Documenti e ricerche sopra Masaccio e la sua famiglia', Rivista d’arte, xiv (1932), pp. 489– 503; xvii (1935), pp. 91–111
————————————	1426 — Stories of St Julian and St Nicholas	(Pisa Altarpiece – poplar, 21 cm × 61 cm) — The work was part of the predella, on the right side, below the lost panels of St Julian and St Nicholas. The two scenes are inextricably combined, and the artist used a single point of perspective as if the two dwellings, open on a side to show the interior, were opposite on the same street. These two scenes are painted in a similar palette of colours like the scenes would require for domestic environments dominated by sleep, and are indeed worthy of a great master's hand. To the left is Julian the Hospitaller carrying out the killing of his parents while asleep, tricked by the devil into believing them to be his wife with her lover. In the adjacent alley Julian, recognizable by the red robe, regrets the act with his wife, covering his face in despair, a gesture reminiscent of Adam in Expulsion from Paradise (see below, fig. 14). The scene at right shows St Nicholas, also dressed in red, looking into the house of a poor man with three daughters, who are asleep. The saint gives them the gift of three golden balls (one of which he's holding in his hand), which will allow them to marry. The rigidity of the symmetrical layout of the two rooms is resolved by slightly turning the second room, in order to avoid repetition.
Saint Paul	1426 — Saint Paul	(Pisa Altarpiece – Tempera on wood, 51 cm × 30 cm) — Saint Paul is the only portion of Masaccio's altarpiece that remains in Pisa, possibly positioned above the lost panel of Saint Peter. He is shown from the waist up, just like another Masaccio panel of similar make, the Saint Andrew below, now at the Getty Museum of Los Angeles. The saint is noticeably hirsute, with long hair and a beard (like a philosopher of old), and stands with firm gaze and looks far away; he is dressed in a red cloak modeled by large fields of colour ably illumined. Unlike the Saint Andrew, the artist's treatment of flesh and drapes has a more delicately nuanced approach, whereas the other work has more contrast and looks sculptural. Paul's fingers are solid and square and, according to the traditional iconography, he holds with his right hand a sword and with the left the Acts. Art historian Paul Joannides (1993) has connected this work with the statue of Jeremiah by Donatello.
Saint Andrew	1426 — Saint Andrew	(Pisa Altarpiece – Tempera and gold leaf on panel, 524mm × 321mm) — Saint Andrew is depicted from the waist up, like the St Paul's panel above (fig. 9). The saint is portrayed holding the cross and the Acts, wrapped in a large green mantle modeled by large fields of color lighted up wisely. The bearded face is reminiscent of ancient philosophers, and the gaze is steady and looking in the distance. Some details, like the perspective of the cross and the saint's solid posture, suggest the artist's intention to optimise these shapes for a view from below, as did Donatello, friend of Masaccio and staying in Pisa during this very period of 1426; Masaccio created this same effect in his Crucifixion (fig. 5 above), with Christ's head tucked into his collar bone. Unlike his St Paul, Masaccio's treatment of flesh and drapes has a more vigorous and sculptural approach, with varying colours, thick and sharp folds making the robe vaporous and heavy. Andrew's fingers are solid and squarish, like those of the Beardless Carmelite in a smaller panel of the altarpiece.
————————————	c. 1426 — Madonna Casini	(Tempera and gold leaf on panel,245mm × 182mm) – In Italian often called The Tickling Madonna, the "Casini" title comes from Cardinal Casini's emblem painted on its back, which indicates a possible commission to Masaccio by Antonio Casini, a Cardinal from Siena. The iconography is unusual, certainly linked to the private client's suggestions and therefore less exposed to criticism and objections. The Virgin holds in her arms the Child in swaddling clothes and with her right hand blesses him by raising two fingers, but the gesture transforms into a more familiar one, perhaps tickling, which makes the baby laugh and grasp his mother's wrist. The background is a layer of gold, on which the halos are finely engraved. Mary's face is serious, as required by the period's pictorial tradition, as it implicitly showed awareness of her son's tragic fate. A particular feature is the red coral pendant at the child's neck, turned to the side in the play: it represents an apotropaic amulet of ancient origin and still popular as a good-luck gift to babies. Despite the flat gold background, of medieval heritage, the Madonna and Child ensemble is turned three-quarters and decentralised, so as to suggest the idea of movement. The Madonna's posture was unique for this time, as no previous work exists where the shoulders assume such a rotation, giving the composition a very natural effect. The light is natural, in the traditional style, but brightens some parts while leaving others in the shadow. Typical of Masaccio's style is also the Virgin's left hand, rough-hewn but extremely expressive, which securely holds the weight of the child. The two halos are still represented flat, not in perspective, but the fact that they fit into one another suggests the idea of different spatial planes. The Virgin's mantle has a particular thickness, achieved by emphasizing the golden rim (with pseudo-Kufic ornament) which, on bending, adheres to the volume of her body.
Stories of St Julian	c. 1426 — Stories of St Julian	(Tempera on panel) – A much damaged panel, sole survival of a predella now at the Horne Museum in Florence: it tells the story of Saint Julian who, following Satan's prophecy, unknowingly kills his mother and father. In the first scene (left) Julian, while hunting, is in conversation with the devil in human form who prophesies him murdering his parents. Julian runs away from home and, after a long pilgrimage, marries a princess. In the central scene Masaccio depicts the moment in which the parents, in the course of searching for Julian, arrive by chance at his castle and spend the night in the master bedroom. Returning from a trip, Julian mistakes his parents for his wife in bed with a lover, and kills them. In the right pane Julian in horror discovers his mistake by meeting his wife; his face is contorted in pain, with a style reminding of Late Gothic, also present in some Donatello sculptures. The shapes, as per fig. 8, are in scaled perspective and modelled by chiaroscuro.
Agony in the Garden and Communion of St Jerome	c. 1426 — Agony in the Garden and Communion of St Jerome	(Tempera on wood, 62 cm × 44 cm with frame) — Currently at the Lindenau-Museum in Altenburg (Germany), the work is disputed, as it seems to be by an artist who attempted to imitate but did not fully understand Masaccio's style.
Expulsion of Adam and Eve	1425–1428 — Expulsion of Adam and Eve	(Fresco, 208 cm × 88 cm) Brancacci Chapel — The Expulsion from the Garden of Eden, depicts a distressed Adam and Eve, chased from the garden by a threatening angel. Adam covers his entire face to express his shame, while Eve's shame requires her to cover parts of her body. The fresco had a huge influence on Michelangelo: Masaccio provided a large inspiration to the more famous Renaissance painter, due to the fact that Michelangelo's teacher, Domenico Ghirlandaio, looked almost exclusively to him for inspiration for his religious scenes. Ghirlandaio also imitated various designs done by Masaccio. This influence is most visible in Michelangelo's "The Fall of Man and the Expulsion from the Garden of Eden" on the ceiling of the Sistine Chapel. There are many possible sources of inspiration Masaccio may have drawn from. For Adam, possible references include numerous sculptures of Marsyas (from Greek Mythology) and certain crucifix done by Donatello. For Eve, art analysts usually point to different versions of Venus Pudica, such as Prudence by Giovanni Pisano. The strong plasticity of the bodies, especially that of Adam, gives a consistence never seen before, with shadows projected by the violent light that strikes from the upper right. Their figures show a thorough knowledge of anatomy (as detailed by Adam's contracted belly); the bodies are so deliberately massive, ugly, realistic, with some errors (such as Adam's ankle) that only increase the expressive immediacy of the whole. Adam is curved, his head bent forward anxiously, walking in the barren desert of the world. The gestures of the two are essential and contained, yet full of expression, where references to the old and the real are intertwined with a deep psychological analysis of man. Masaccio's painting is sober and realistic, with a powerful use of chiaroscuro which models and describes with simplicity the essential elements of the figures. Three centuries after the fresco was painted, Cosimo III de' Medici, in line with contemporary ideas of decorum, ordered that fig leaves be added to conceal the genitals of the figures. These were eventually removed in the 1980s when the painting was fully restored and cleaned.
———————————— ————————————	1425–1428 — The Tribute Money	(Fresco: 255 cm × 598 cm) Brancacci Chapel — External videos: Masaccio's The Tribute Money in the Brancacci Chapel, Smarthistory; The painting is part of a cycle on the life of Saint Peter, and describes a scene from the Gospel of Matthew, in which Jesus directs Peter to find a coin in the mouth of a fish in order to pay the temple tax — The Tribute Money is drawn from the Gospel Matthew 17:24–27. The painting owes its importance in particular to its revolutionary use of perspective and chiaroscuro. It suffered great damage in the centuries after its creation, until the chapel went through a thorough restoration in the 1980s. The painting diverges somewhat from the biblical story, in that the tax collector confronts the whole group of Christ and the disciples, and the entire scene takes place outdoors. The story is told in three parts that do not occur sequentially, but the narrative logic is still maintained, through compositional devises. The central scene is that of the tax collector demanding the tribute. The head of Christ is the vanishing point of the painting, drawing the eyes of the spectator there. Both Christ and Peter then point to the left hand part of the painting, where the next scene takes place in the middle background: Peter taking the money out of the mouth of the fish. The final scene – where Peter pays the tax collector – is at the right, set apart by the framework of an architectural structure. Only two of the disciples can be identified with any degree of certainty: Peter with his iconographic grey hair and beard, and blue and yellow attire, and John; the young beardless man standing next to Christ. John's head is reminiscent of Roman sculptures, and it is reflected in the very similar face of another disciple on the right. The person next to this disciple is assumed to be Judas, whose dark and sinister face mirrors that of the tax collector. It has been speculated – first by Vasari – that the face on the far right is a self-portrait of Masaccio himself, as Thomas. This work maintains a heavy importance in the art history world, as it is widely believed to be the first painting, since the fall of Rome (ca. 476 A.D.), to use scientific linear one point perspective: All the orthogonals point to one vanishing point, in this case, Christ. Also, it is one of the first paintings that does away with the use of a head-cluster, a technique employed by earlier Proto-Renaissance artists, such as Giotto or Duccio. If a viewer were to walk into the painting, she or he could walk around Jesus Christ in the semicircle created, and back out of the painting again with ease. Masaccio is often compared to contemporaries like Donatello and Brunelleschi as a pioneer of the Renaissance, particularly for his use of single-point perspective. One technique that was unique to Masaccio, however, was the use of atmospheric, or aerial perspective. Both the mountains in the background, and the figure of Peter on the left are dimmer and paler than the objects in the foreground, creating an illusion of depth. This technique was known in ancient Rome, but was considered lost until reinvented by Masaccio. Masaccio's use of light was also revolutionary. While earlier artists like Giotto had applied a flat, neutral light from an unidentifiable source, Masaccio's light emanated from a specific location outside the picture, casting the figures in light and shadow. This created a chiaroscuro effect, sculpting the bodies into three-dimensional shapes. Masaccio is often justly praised for the variety of his facial depictions. In the case of this painting the accolade is somewhat diminished, however, by the fact that the work was unfinished at the time of his death, and the heads of Jesus and St Peter were painted by his senior collaborator Masolino da Panicale, (who painted the corresponding perspective work on the other side of the chapel, "Healing of the Cripple and Raising of Tabitha".
Baptism of the Neophytes	1425–1428 — The Baptism of the Neophytes	(Fresco: 255 cm × 162 cm) Brancacci Chapel — The scene is located in the middle register, on the wall behind the altar on the right. The Gospel text narrates that, after the Pentecost, Peter began to preach exhorting the people to be baptised in the name of Jesus Christ: in this scene he begins to baptise with a bowl. The story, set in a valley between steep hills, shows some young people who are preparing to receive the baptism: one is kneeling in the river and receives his baptism with joined hands; another one already stripped is waiting with crossed arms, trembling from the cold (great realism, the only figure praised by Vasari in the chapel); a third is taking his clothes off. Still another, barefoot and his head clearly wet, is dressing himself and buttoning his blue tunic. Extraordinary is the sense of the water and the wet effect in the kneeling man's hair. Peter's gesture is energetic and eloquent (note the rotation of the bowl). A crowd stands nearby, among which there are some characters who may be portraits of contemporaries. All figures glide naturally in depth, through the perfect relationship of light and shadow, which anticipate the aerial view. The two men behind Peter are two Florentine witnesses, wearing the typical headgear called "mazzocchio" (chaperon). Their highly individualised faces suggest two portraits of notables. In this scene Peter is depicted alone, whereas in the Gospel he was in the company of the other apostles: this choice strongly emphasizes Peter's leadership and his personification with the whole Church.
————————————	1425–1428 — Raising of the Son of Teophilus and St Peter Enthroned	(Fresco: 230 cm × 598 cm) Brancacci Chapel — Masaccio returned in 1427 to work again in Santa Maria del Carmine, Pisa, beginning the Raising of the Son of Teophilus, but apparently left it unfinished, though it has also been suggested that the painting was severely damaged later in the century because it contained portraits of the Brancacci family, at that time excoriated as enemies of the Medici. This painting was either restored or completed more than fifty years later by Filippino Lippi. Some of the scenes completed by Masaccio and Masolino were lost in a fire in 1771; we know about them only through Vasari's biography. The surviving parts were extensively blackened by smoke, and the recent removal of marble slabs covering two areas of the paintings has revealed the original appearance of the work.
St Peter Healing the Sick	1425–1428 — St Peter Healing the Sick with His Shadow	(Fresco: 230 cm × 162 cm) Brancacci Chapel — The scene is located in the lower register of the wall behind the altar, on the left. The Gospel text recalls how some citizens of Jerusalem brought their sick into the streets, putting them on pallets and stretchers in a position to be touched by Peter's shadow, and all were cured. The composition is very eloquent: St Peter, followed by St John, walking on the street and on passing his shadow heals a group of sick people: two are already up to thank him (one has stick, the other a bandaged ankle), one is rising and fourth, with bent deformed legs, still crouched on the ground, looks at the saint. The figure with the red cap has been recognized as a portrait of Masolino, while St John could represent a portrait of Masaccio's brother, known as "The Splinter", followed by an old bearded man (perhaps Bicci di Lorenzo). The realistic urban landscape is very rare for the period, even more so the movement toward the viewer suggested by the scene, obtained through the use of perspective. The lines of this scene and its symmetry converged at the center of the wall where, under the primitive window, Masaccio's Crucifixion was located (fig. 5). The figures are identified specifically with a few but sufficient individual traits, which avoid the generic characterization of Masolino. The sense of human dignity typical of the Renaissance also permeates ugliness, poverty and physical illness, subliming their representation and thus avoiding any complacency towards the grotesque.
The Distribution of Alms	1425–1428 — The Distribution of Alms and Death of Ananias	(Fresco: 230 cm × 162 cm) Brancacci Chapel – The scene is located in the lower register on the wall behind the altar, on the right. In Acts events are described immediately before those of the fresco on the left (fig. 18): the first Christian believers helped each other, and those who had lands or houses sold them, putting the money in a common fund available to all through the apostles, who collected and distributed it as needed. In the fresco, Saint Peter and St John are in fact distributing money to the poor, including a woman with a child in her arms, the very emblem of Charity. The dead man on the ground, Ananias, was punished because he had retained for himself a portion of the proceeds from the sale of his land (Acts 5:1–11). Where the scene of the healing (fig. 18) reminded one of the Roman Church founded by Peter and caring for the sick, this fresco personifies the Church as a distributor of goods and punisher of the wicked. The scene is characterised by a stylistic maturity, which makes the figures' expression most vigorous, besides composing the background in a more articulate manner, with architectural volumes less stereotyped. The group's arrangement, however, is more static than that of fig. 18, with the flight into perspective blocked by the circle of those present and from the white building in the background.
Trinity	1427–1428 — Holy Trinity	(Fresco, 667 cm × 317 cm) Santa Maria Novella, Florence — External videos: Masaccio's Holy Trinity, Smarthistory; The Magic of Illusion: The Trinity-Masaccio, Part 2, National Gallery of Art; Diverse interpretations of the fresco have been proposed. Most scholars have seen it as a traditional image intended for personal devotions and commemorations of the dead, although explanations of how the painting reflects these functions differ in their details. The iconography of the Trinity, flanked by Mary and John or including donors, is not uncommon in Italian art of the late 14th and early 15th centuries, and the association of the Trinity with a tomb also has precedents. No precedent for the exact iconography of Masaccio's fresco, combining all these elements, has been discovered, however. The figures of the two patrons have most often been identified as members of the Lenzi family or, more recently, a member of the Berti family of the Santa Maria Novella quarter of Florence. They serve as models of religious devotion for viewers but, because they are located closer to the sacred figures than the viewers are, they also lay claim to special status. The cadaver tomb consists of a sarcophagus on which lies a skeleton. "Carved" in the wall above the skeleton is an inscription: "IO FU[I] G[I]A QUEL CHE VOI S[I]ETE E QUEL CH['] I[O] SONO VO[I] A[N]C[OR] SARETE" (I once was what you are and what I am you also will be). This memento mori underlines that the painting was intended to serve as a lesson to the viewers. At the simplest level the imagery must have suggested to the 15th-century faithful that, since they all would die, only their faith in the Trinity and Christ's sacrifice would allow them to overcome their transitory existences. According to American art historian Mary McCarthy: The fresco, with its terrible logic, is like a proof in philosophy or mathematics, God the Father, with His unrelenting eyes, being the axiom from which everything else irrevocably flows.
————————————	c. 1427 — Desco da parto (birthing-tray)	(Tondo – Tempera on wood, diameter 56 cm) – "Visit to the nursery". This painting, also known as the Berlin Tondo, is a desco da parto, or birthing-tray painted around 1427–1428, though the work is regarded as from his workshop or by a "follower" by many recent scholars. While the birth of Jesus, and that of his mother, were very common scenes in religious art, and often used contemporary settings and costumes, actual depictions of a contemporary childbirth were very rare. This specific work attest to a rich client, perhaps a Gonfaloniere of Justice, judging by the presence in the scene of official trumpeters of the Signoria of Florence. The recto shows a nativity scene, set in Masaccio's Florence: on the left the trumpeters, with the easily recognizable Florentine banners, arrive and play their trumpets (note the swollen cheeks of the trumpeter in the foreground) to announce the presentation of official gifts, such as this very tray held by the man on the far left. Some women and two nuns are entering the house. The latter appear to be bothered by the music, especially the nun at the center who glares at the trumpeters. They all walk through a Renaissance portico delimited by a courtyard and a room where, on the right, the mother lies surrounded by the midwives. Cradled by a woman in the foreground is the baby, fully wrapped according to the custom of the time. Around his neck is a red coral chain, ancient apotropaic symbol. The design closely recalls the works by Donatello in: the organisation of regular space receding in depth at set intervals, the characters moving in and out of the frame, the anecdotal liveliness of figurines, the numerous details from everyday life.; It might even be that Masaccio painted on a drawing by his sculptor friend. Watching the scene the viewer has a feeling of having peeked into an episode of family life, as suggested by the seemingly casual architecture, slightly asymmetric, or the sidelong glances between the various characters, such as the severe nun at the center. Here too, as in fig. 18 above, the artist used a perspective construction in order to give his figures a sense of motion towards the viewer. The verso of the birthing-tray depicts a chubby male child (putto) who warns a pet, maybe a small dog. The scene, which was to allude to the client or his family, has not yet been identified. It is assumed that it is inspired by an antique putto and, being of lower quality, could have been painted by an assistant of Masaccio, perhaps Andrea di Giusto.
St Jerome and St John the Baptist	1428 — Saints Jerome and John the Baptist	(Tempera on poplar, 114 cm × 55 cm) — Originally destined for the Basilica di Santa Maria Maggiore, the painting is now at the National Gallery of London. It was Masaccio's contribution to Masolino's polyptych for the altar of that Basilica. St Jerome is represented in a cardinal's attire, holding a book (his Vulgate open on Genesis) and the model of a church (he is in fact a "Father of the Church"), while at his feet is a very small lion, from whose paw he would have removed a thorn (according to some hagiographies). St John the Baptist is also shown with some typical attributes, such as the fur vest, the stick with the cross and a scroll with the words "Ecce Agnus Dei" (Behold the Lamb of God). To a careful observer, the stick is revealed as a slender Corinthian column, the emblem of the Colonna family, from which came Pope Martin V of Masaccio's times. Both figures have a very expressive physiognomy, far from the traditional "soft" expressions of International Gothic: Jerome appears stern and grim, while John looks scruffy and also slightly sad. It is the wealth of observations taken from the ordinary that reveals Masaccio's hand, such as John's bony foot so firmly planted on the ground and shortened to perfection. These details he shared with his friend Donatello, and it was Vasari who pointed out how Masaccio put an end to the "barbarian" habit of the Gothic to put its figures as on tiptoes. There are some errors, such as Jerome's arm being too short, or at least badly foreshortened. Remarkable are the studies in realistic light, which affects the figures from the top-left corner: it hits the Baptist on the shoulder, amplifying, due to the chromatic contrast, the distance between him and Jerome, who stands before John; half of Jerome's face is in the shadow, as a result of the large hat; part of John's left leg is exposed and beautifully lit up; and light draws the shadows on the carpet of wild flowers. The roundness of John's sculptoreal limbs achieves a realistic peak previously unknown in painting.

== Bibliography ==
- Miklos Boskovits, Giotto born again, 1966
- Luciano Berti, L'opera completa di Masaccio, Milan: Rizzoli, 1968
- Roberto Longhi, Fatti di Masolino e Masaccio, Milan: Sansoni, 1975
- Divo Savelli, "La Sagra di Masaccio", Florence: Pagnini, 1998
- John T. Spike, Masaccio, Milan: Rizzoli libri illustrati, 2002. ISBN 88-7423-007-9
- Cecilia Frosinini, Masaccio, Florence: Giunti, 2003. ISBN 978-8809030534
