= Paolo Schiavo =

Italian painter (1397–1478)

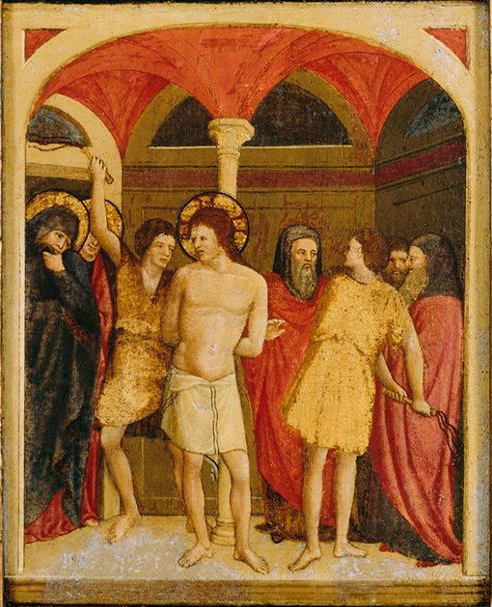
Paolo Schiavo, The Flagellation, oil on panel, 1430s

Paolo Schiavo, the pseudonym of Paolo di Stefano Badaloni (1397–1478) was a Florentine painter.

Born in Florence, Paolo Schiavo enrolled in the Guild of Doctors and Apothecaries (Arte dei Medici e Speziali) in 1428. According to Vasari, he was a follower of Masolino. In 1435 he went to Castiglione Olona with Masolino where he realized the first section of the Collegiata's apse right wall. Frescoes by Schiavo adorn the chapel on the left in the church of San Michele a Castellaccio di Sommaia, near Florence. Among his further dedications were frescoes of the Virgin and Child Enthroned with Saints for the church of San Miniato al Monte with an unusually pink pseudo-architectural framework (1436), The Crucifixion Adored by Nuns (1447–1448), an Adoration of the Magi, and an Annunciation with various saints. He made several other works, all of which bear his signature and their corresponding dates. He died in Pisa.

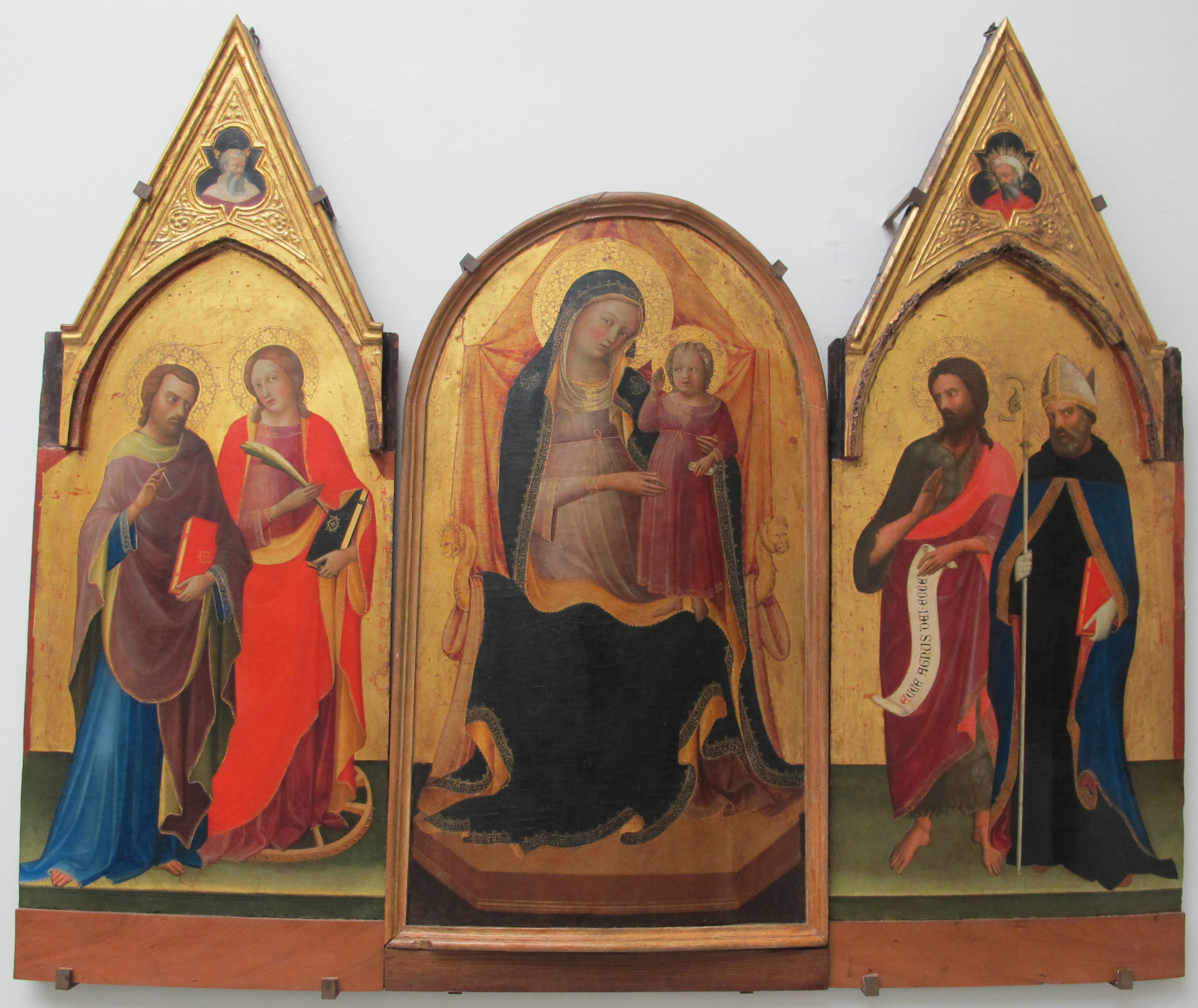
Madonna and Saints, triptych by Lorenzo Monaco and Paolo Schiavo, Collegiata di Sant'Andrea, Empoli
