= Brugnatelli =

Brugnatelli may refer to:

- Luigi Valentino Brugnatelli
- Collegio Castiglioni Brugnatelli
