= Branda da Castiglione =

Italian humanist, papal diplomat and cardinal (1350–1443)

His Eminence Branda da Castiglione
- Cardinal-Bishop of Sabina
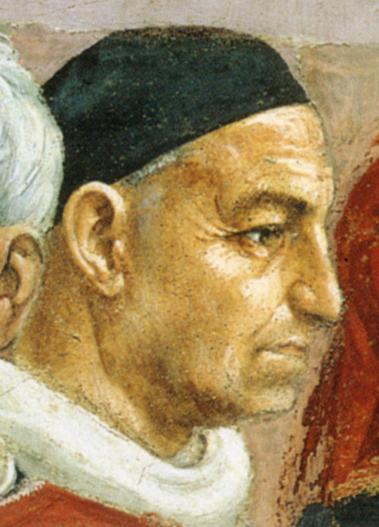
- Cardinal Branda, detail from Raising of the Son of Teophilus and Saint Peter Enthroned, by Masaccio, Cappella Brancacci, Florence
- Church: Catholic Church
- Appointed: 29 Jan 1440
- Term ended: 3 February 1443
- Predecessor: Giordano Orsini
- Successor: Bessarion
- Previous posts: Bishop of Piacenza (1404–1411); Cardinal-Bishop of Porto–Santa Rufina (1431–1440)

Orders
- Created cardinal: 6 June 1411 by Antipope John XXIII (Confirmed by Pope Martin V)
- Rank: Cardinal-Bishop

Personal details
- Born: 4 February 1350 Castiglione Olona, Lordship of Milan
- Died: 3 February 1443 (aged 92) Castiglione Olona, Duchy of Milan
- Coat of arms: Branda da Castiglione's coat of arms

Branda da Castiglione (4 February 1350 – 3 February 1443) was an early Italian humanist, a papal diplomat and a Roman Catholic cardinal.

== Early life ==
He was born on 4 February 1350 in Castiglione Olona to a Milanese noble family related to Goffredo Castiglioni, Pope Celestine IV. Branda was the eldest son of Maffiolo da Castiglione and his wife Lucrezia Porro, of the family of the counts of Polenta.

In 1374 he is documented as enrolled in the Collegio dei nobili Giureconsulti of Milan. He studied also at the recently founded University of Pavia, where he received a doctorate in civil and canon law in the academic year 1388/89 and then taught canon law at the University, supported by Galeazzo Visconti, Duke of Milan.

== Early career ==
In 1389 Gian Galeazzo Visconti sent him to Rome to the papal court of Boniface IX, entrusted with obtaining papal privileges for the University of Pavia, of authorization to teach theology and to enjoy the same conditions as the University of Bologna and that of Paris. Branda's abilities were quickly recognized in Rome. At the same time he was nominated to the position of auditore of the Collegio della Sacra Rota. He served as chaplain to Boniface IX, who sent him as legate to Germany. In 1393 he was made archpriest of San Martino di Legnano Veronese and a canon at the city of Tortona; in 1398 he possessed six benefices in the archdiocese of Milan and others beyond it. In 1419 he was made abbot in commendam of Tre Fontane Abbey.

In 1401 Bonifacio charged him with a mission to Cologne and Flanders as apostolic nuncio and in 1403 sent him to Hungary and Transylvania. In this sojourn he made a fast friendship with Sigismund of Luxemburg, King of Hungary, who was later Holy Roman Emperor.

In August 1404 he was made bishop of Piacenza; under the unsettled conditions of the Western Schism the see was not automatically secure: he was deposed and replaced by Pope Gregory XII in 1409. In 1409 he attended the Council of Pisa, intended to put an end to the schism that was dividing the Catholic Church. The Council elected Pietro Filargo, archbishop of Milan, who sat briefly as Pope Alexander V and reinstated Branda and maintained him in the see of Piacenza. Alexander's successor Baldassare Cossa, elected Pope John XXIII, sent Branda as pontifical legate to Hungary.

== Cardinal ==
On 6 June 1411 John XXIII named him a cardinal; he gave up his see of Piacenza and took for his titulus San Clemente, adding the cardinal's hat and tassels to his family arms. His position strengthened his relations with Sigismund, who made him Count of Veszprém (Hungary) in 1411 and at Branda's urging raised all the male members of the Castiglioni to the rank of count palatine in 1417, and with the new duke of Milan, Filippo Maria Visconti.

The deadlock of the schism forced the convocation of another council, at Constance. Branda assisted at several sessions, working towards a compromise. On 11 November 1417 the conclave proclaimed Ottone Colonna, who assumed the papal name Martin V, recognized by the entire Church. Branda da Castiglione and the other eleven cardinals accompanied Martin to Milan, where he consecrated the high altar of the Duomo. In Rome, Martin gave Branda the use of the Palazzo S. Apollinare in Piazza Navona.

In 1421 Branda was at Castiglione Olona, where he announced his plans to rebuild the walled village of his birth. In March 1425 he consecrated the new collegial parish church at Castiglione Olona. The project was described, using the vocabulary of Vitruvius, by the humanist bishop of Pavia, Francesco Pizolpasso. In the same year he was sent as envoy to Bohemia with the mission, of which he was the galvanizing force, of stamping out the heretical movement of the followers of Jan Hus, in the name of Christian uniformity, employing Imperial forces headed by Filippo Scolari, called "Pippo Spano". He appointed Nikolaus von Dinkelsbühl the official preacher against the Hussites.

He moved on to Hungary once more, pursuing diplomatic objectives, and taking Masolino with him. His mission as papal legate took him to Bohemia and Moravia, Poland and Germany, often moving with the Imperial court.

He represented the Visconti in treaty negotiations at Florence, and participated in the conclave of 1431 that elected a successor to Martin V, Pope Eugenius IV. He participated in the Council of Florence, sitting at Ferrara and Florence, 1438 to 1442. In Florence he came to know the work of Masolino, occupied with the Brancacci Chapel; Branda convinced Masolino to accompany him to Hungary for three years (1425–28) and commissioned him to carry out frescoes for his Capella Castiglione in his titular church of San Clemente, Rome and decorative landscapes for Palazzo Branda in Castiglione Olona.

He returned to Castiglione Olona, where he became ill in December 1442 and died in early February 1443 in his Palazzo Branda, aged ninety-three. Leonardo Griffi composed the elogy at his funeral and Branda's secretary, Giovanni da Olmütz, deposited his vita on parchment in the stone sarcophagus.

== As patron ==
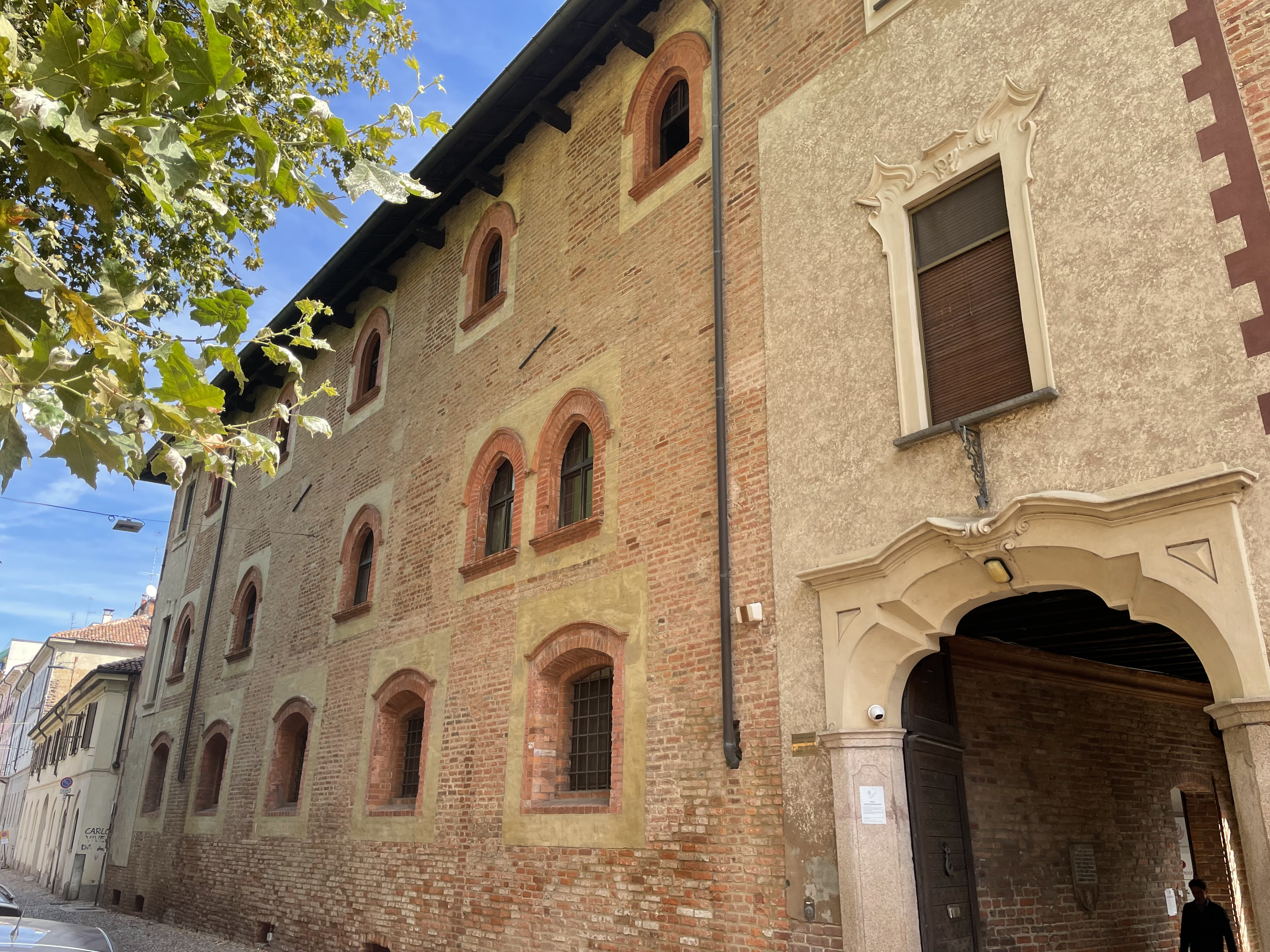
Pavia, Collegio Castiglioni Brugnatelli (1429).

He commissioned work from Masolino da Panicale, Lorenzo di Pietro, "il Vecchietta" and Paolo Schiavo, he rebuilt his family village of Castiglione Olona in the mould of a Renaissance ideal city of humanist culture, the first centre of Tuscan Renaissance culture in northern Lombardy. In the little town he rebuilt the palazzo of his ancestors and added another for his familia.

He built the Chiesa del Santissimo Corpo di Cristo and founded a school for the boys of the region, the Scuola di Canto e Grammatica di Castiglione Olona and a nunnery for the feminine members of the Humiliati and donated a library to the commune. In Pavia he founded a college in 1430 under the protection of Saint Augustine, now known as Collegio Castiglioni Brugnatelli.
