= Collegiata of Castiglione Olona =

Church in Castiglione Olona, Varese

Coordinates: 45.7574°N 8.8648°E

- Collegiata dei Santi Stefano e Lorenzo di Castiglione Olona
- The church's façade
- Collegiata of Castiglione Olona
- Location: Castiglione Olona, Varese
- Country: Italy
- Denomination: Roman Catholic

History
- Founded: 1422
- Founder: Branda da Castiglione
- Consecrated: 1425

Architecture
- Years built: 1422-1425

Administration
- Diocese: Archdiocese of Milan
- Parish: Castiglione Olona

The Collegiata of Castiglione Olona (Collegiata of Santi Stefano and Lorenzo) is a Roman Catholic church in Castiglione Olona, Varese, Italy. Commissioned by Cardinal Branda Castiglioni in the early 15th century, it is notable for its Lombard Gothic architecture and its Renaissance frescoes by Masolino da Panicale and other painters. The church forms part of the Collegiata Museum complex, together with the adjacent baptistery and museum.

== History ==
The church was commissioned by Cardinal Branda Castiglioni, a diplomat and patron of the arts who sought to transform his family's home town into a Renaissance centre. On 7 January 1422, Pope Martin V authorised the construction of the collegiate church. Building work took place between 1422 and 1425, and the church was consecrated on 25 March 1425. The church was constructed on the site of the medieval castle of Castiglione Olona. Its construction formed part of a broader scheme of urban and artistic renewal promoted by Cardinal Branda, which included the adjoining baptistery and other buildings in the town. The collegiate chapter remained in existence until 1798. The church was restored during the 19th and 20th centuries.

== Architecture ==
The church is built of brickwork, with elements of grey sandstone. Its architectural style is generally described as Lombard Gothic. The building is divided into three naves, with a gabled façade decorated with small arches. The main entrance is framed by twisted columns and topped by a carved lunette dated 1428. The relief depicts the Virgin Mary and Child, Cardinal Branda Castiglioni, and Saints Ambrose, Clement, Lawrence and Stephen. Below the lunette, the four Evangelists are represented in sculpted niches. A stone rose window occupies the space above the entrance. The church's bell tower stands beside the main building. The complex also includes the adjoining baptistery, which was constructed on the foundations of a tower belonging to the former castle.

The baptistery of the Collegiata

The baptistery, like much of the church, was decorated by Masolino da Panicale during the 1420s.

== Interior ==
The interior of the Collegiata

The church is notable for its early Renaissance paintings. Masolino da Panicale painted a cycle of frescoes depicting scenes from the life of the Virgin Mary on the vault of the apse. The scenes include the Nativity of the Virgin, the Annunciation, the Marriage of the Virgin, the Adoration of the Magi, the Coronation of the Virgin and the Assumption.

The apse of the Collegiata

Other frescoes in the apse depict episodes from the lives of the church's patron saints, Stephen and Lawrence. These paintings are associated with Paolo Schiavo and Lorenzo di Pietro, known as il Vecchietta, artists who worked alongside or in the same artistic environment as Masolino.

== Collegiata Museum ==
The church forms part of the Collegiata Museum (Museo della Collegiata), a museum complex that also includes the baptistery and collections of religious and artistic objects. The collections include paintings, choir books, goldsmiths' work, ivory objects and sculptures. The museum complex received regional museum recognition in 2009, with the site also described by the municipality as officially recognised in 2010.
