= Langhirano =

- Comune
- Comune di Langhirano
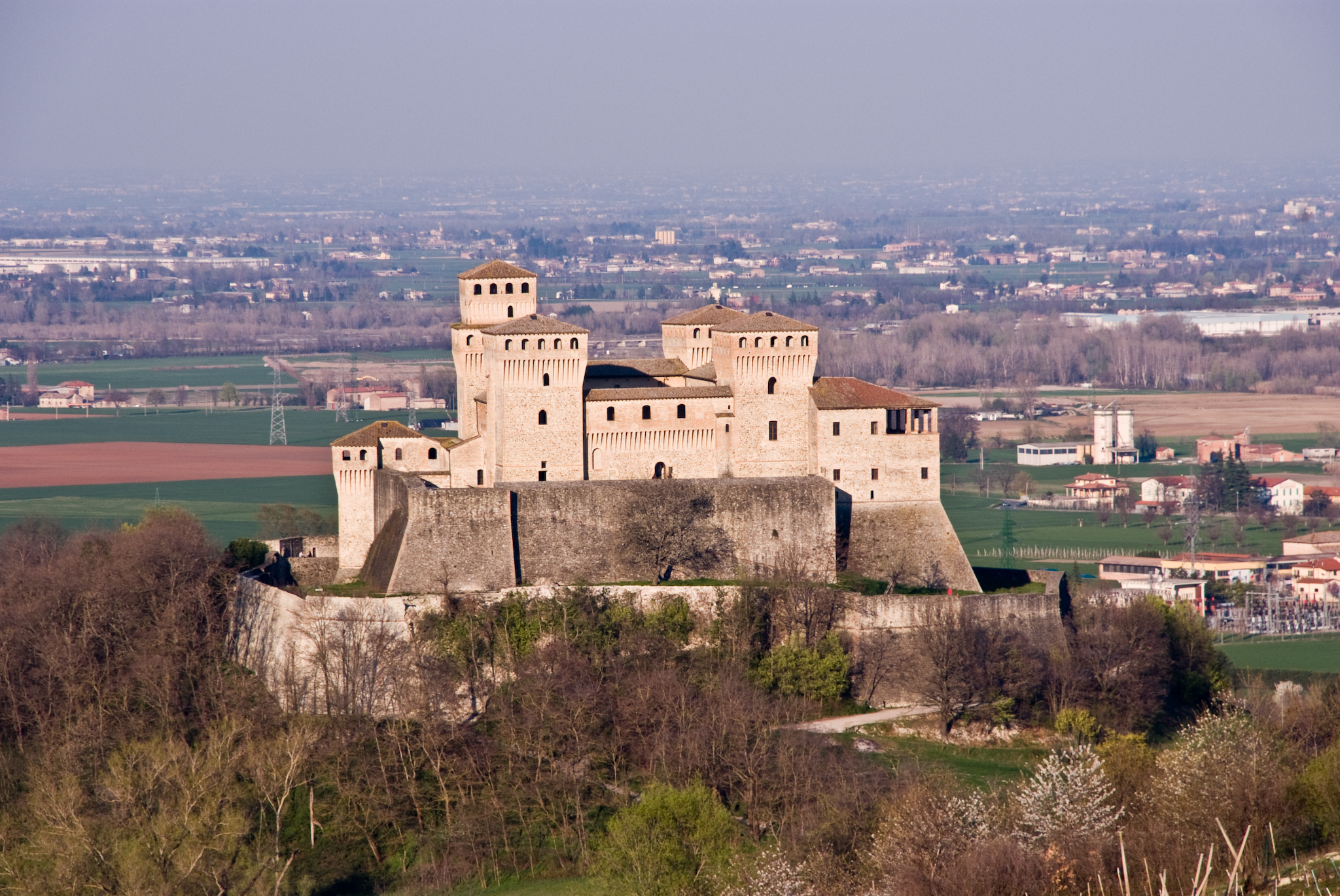
- Torrechiara Castle

- Coat of arms

- Location within Italy Location within Emilia-Romagna
- Coordinates: 44°37′N 10°16′E
- Country: Italy
- Region: Emilia-Romagna
- Province: Parma (PR)
- Frazioni: Antesica, Arola, Berzola, Calicella, Casatico, Case Manfredelli, Case Ughi, Cattabiano, Costa di Castrignano, Cozzano, Fontana, Goiano, Il Chioso, Manzano, Mattaleto, Pastorello, Pilastro, Pranello, Querceto, Quinzano, Riano, Sodina, Strognano, Tabbiano, Tordenaso, Torrechiara, Valle di Castrignano, Vidiana, Villaggio Pineta

Government
  - Mayor: Giordano Bricoli

Area
  - Total: 70.8 km^{2} (27.3 sq mi)
- Elevation: 265 m (869 ft)

Population (31 August 2017)
  - Total: 10,365
  - Density: 146/km^{2} (379/sq mi)
- Demonym: Langhiranesi
- Time zone: UTC+1 (CET)
  - Summer (DST): UTC+2 (CEST)
- Postal code: 43013
- Dialing code: 0521
- Patron saint: St. James the Less
- Saint day: March 25
- Website: Official website

Langhirano (Parmigiano: Langhiràn) is a comune (municipality) in the Province of Parma in the Italian region Emilia-Romagna, located about 90 kilometres (56 mi) west of Bologna and about 20 kilometres (12 mi) south of Parma.

Langhirano borders the following municipalities: Calestano, Corniglio, Felino, Lesignano de' Bagni, Neviano degli Arduini, Parma, Tizzano Val Parma.

Its most striking feature are the castle of Torrechiara and the Abbey of Santa Maria della Neve . The town is also known as a major production centre for the Prosciutto di Parma.

Langhirano was the childhood home of soprano Renata Tebaldi, who is buried there.

== International relations ==
Langhirano is twinned with:

- Cavaillon, France
- Espalion, France
- Tauste, Spain
- Nove, Italy
