= Bonifacio Bembo =

15th-century Italian painter

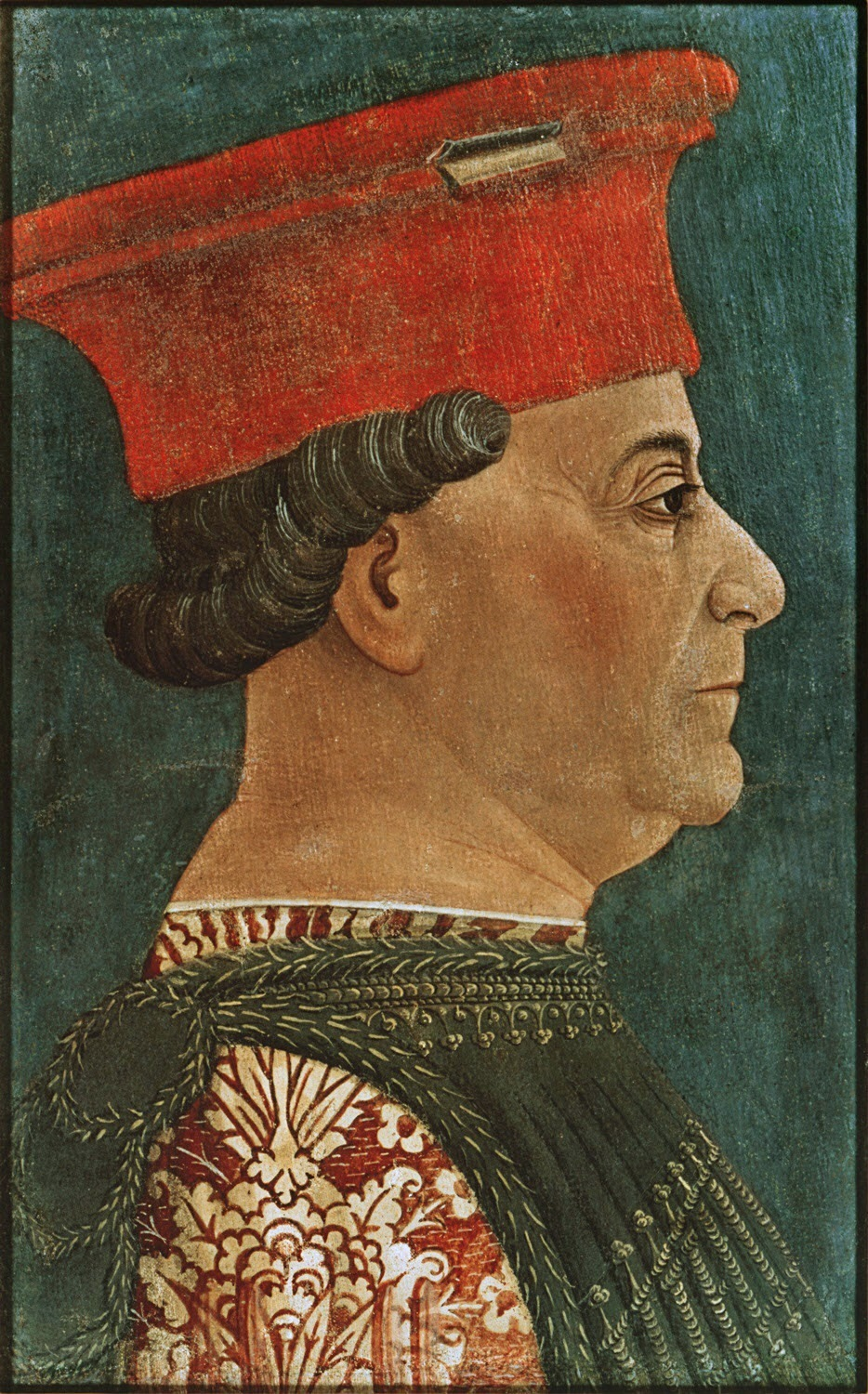
Portrait of Francesco Sforza. ca. 1460. Tempera on panel, 40 x 31 cm. Pinacoteca di Brera, Milan.

Bonifacio Bembo, also known as Bonfazio Bembo, or simply just Bembo, was a northern Italian Renaissance artist born in Brescia in 1420. He was the son of Giovanni Bembo, an active painter during his time. As a painter, Bonifacio mainly worked in Cremona. He was patronized by the Sforza family and was commissioned to paint portraits of Francesco Sforza and his wife Bianca Maria Visconti. Scholars have credited him as the artist who produced a tarot card deck for the Visconti-Sforza families, now held in the Cary Collection of Playing Cards at Yale University. In the past century, art historians have begun to question the authenticity of his works, believing his only two secure works to be the portraits of Francesco and Bianca Maria Sforza. He is believed to have died sometime before 1482.

== Biography ==
Bonifacio Bembo was born in Brescia, Italy, in 1420 to an Italian family of painters. He was the son of Giovanni Bembo, a painter active in Cremona from 1425 to 1449. His brothers Benedetto and Andrea were also painters active in the areas of Cremona and Parma. Bonifacio also had a nephew named Giovanni Francesco Bembo, who became a painter. In all, there are thought to be nine artists with the last name Bembo who were active in Cremona from 1425 until the early 1600s. Based on letters written by Bembo, he claimed to be a supporter of Francesco Sforza in 1447 following the death of Filippo Maria Visconti, the Duke of Milan. Sforza eventually became Duke of Milan in 1450, and because of the support Bembo had shown him a few years prior, he commissioned him to many works. On 23 April 1474, Galeazzo Sforza, the Duke of Milan, granted Bembo and his descendants Milanese citizenship. The patronage of the Sforza family continued until 1477 when Bembo seems to disappear from the historical record.

== Works ==
Bonifacio was active between 1447 and 1478. He painted portraits, frescoes, biblical scenes, and also designed tarot cards. He is known for the frescoes found in the ducal chapel of the Castello Sforzesco in Milan. He also painted portraits of Francesco Sforza and his wife, Bianca Maria Visconti. These portraits hang in the church of Sant'Agostino in Cremona.

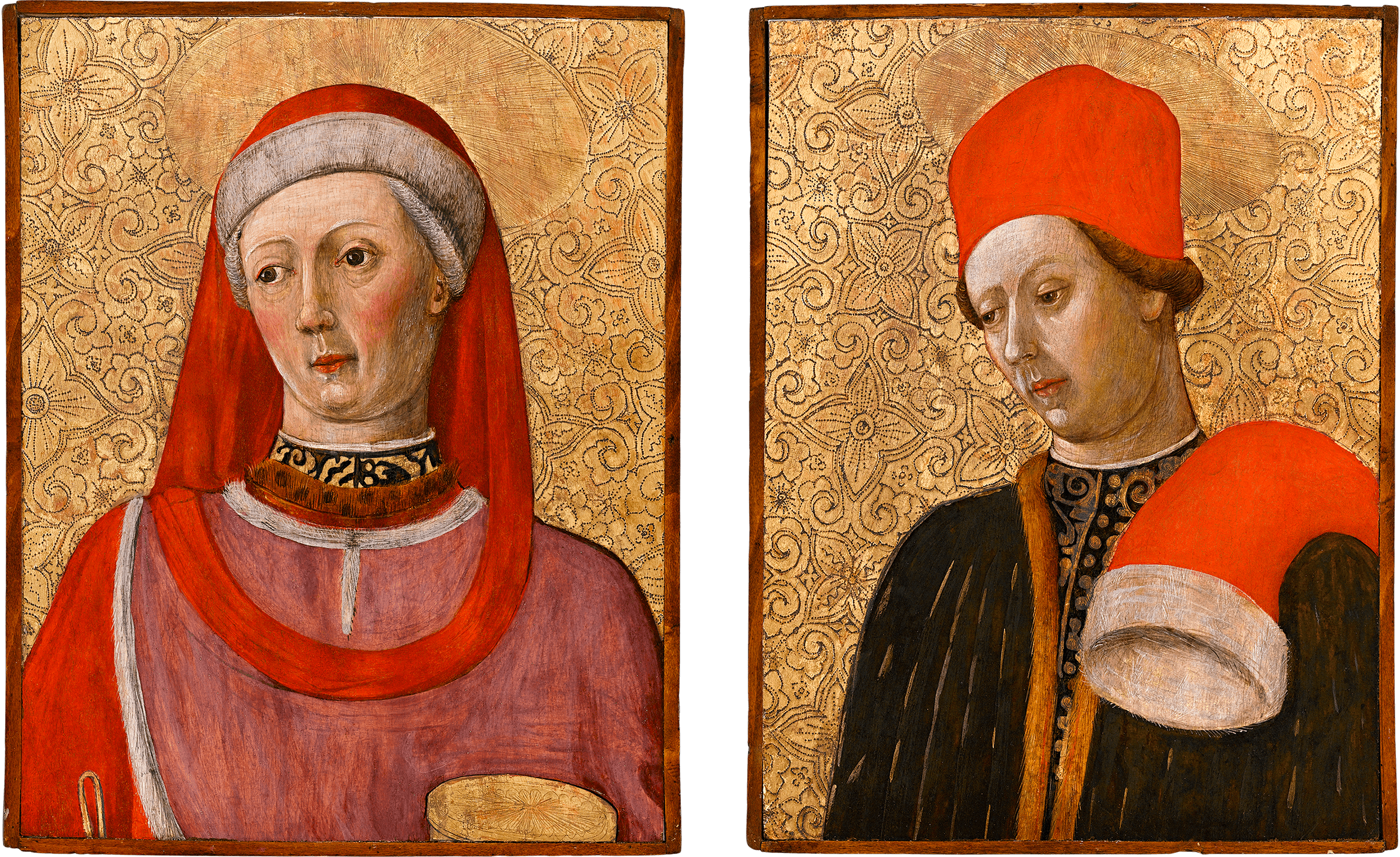
Saint Cosmas and Saint Damian attributed to Bonifacio Bembo from an altarpiece displayed in the Church of Sant’Agostino in Cremona. Circa 1454–1458

His earliest attributed work is the Cavalcabò chapel in the same Sant'Agostino. Giovanni Cavalcabo paid for the decoration of the chapel in 1447, and it took approximately five years to complete. Strangely, there is no connection between Bembo and the chapel; however, following the publication of Wittgen in 1936, the chapel has been attributed to him. While painting the decorations of the chapel, Bembo showed fine style, demonstrating the influence of Michelino da Besozzo and the Zavattari brothers. The frescoes in the chapel depict Evangelists and the coronation of Christ and the Virgin. Bright colours illuminate the frescoes while all of the figures are drawn using thin, curving lines.

He painted an altarpiece commemorating the wedding day, October 25, of Bianca and Francesco Sforza for their chapel in Sant'Agostino in 1462. Yet he had still not been paid for the altarpiece by 1469. Bembo also painted the altarpiece of Cremona Cathedral in 1467.

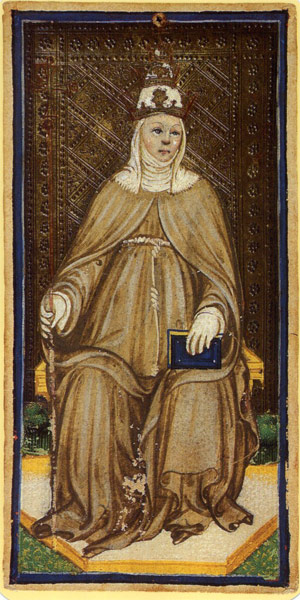
The Popess tarot card from the Visconti-Sforza deck drawn and painted by Bonifacio Bembo.

Upon the succession of Galeazzo Maria Sforza in 1466, Bembo's work for the Sforza family increased. In 1468, the Sforzas sent him to Pavia, where he worked for three years. While there, he painted secular decorations depicting the Duke and Duchess hunting and dining. In the summer of 1472, he began to work on a votive chapel of St Mary outside Vigevano with Leonard Ponzoni at the behest of Galeazzo Sforza.

In 1460, Bembo was commissioned by Francesco Sforza to paint a portrait of him and his wife. The portraits originally hung on pillars outside the chapel of SS Daria and Grisante, again in the church of Sant'Agostino of Cremona. They were then transferred onto canvas and moved inside the chapel itself, where they both hang today. The well-preserved and detailed head of Francesco Sforza demonstrates that Bembo was a competent portrait painter. The details of Francesco's mole on his cheek, his chin folds, and his pursed lips were all captured with shadowy lines and demonstrate the competence of Bembo as an artist.

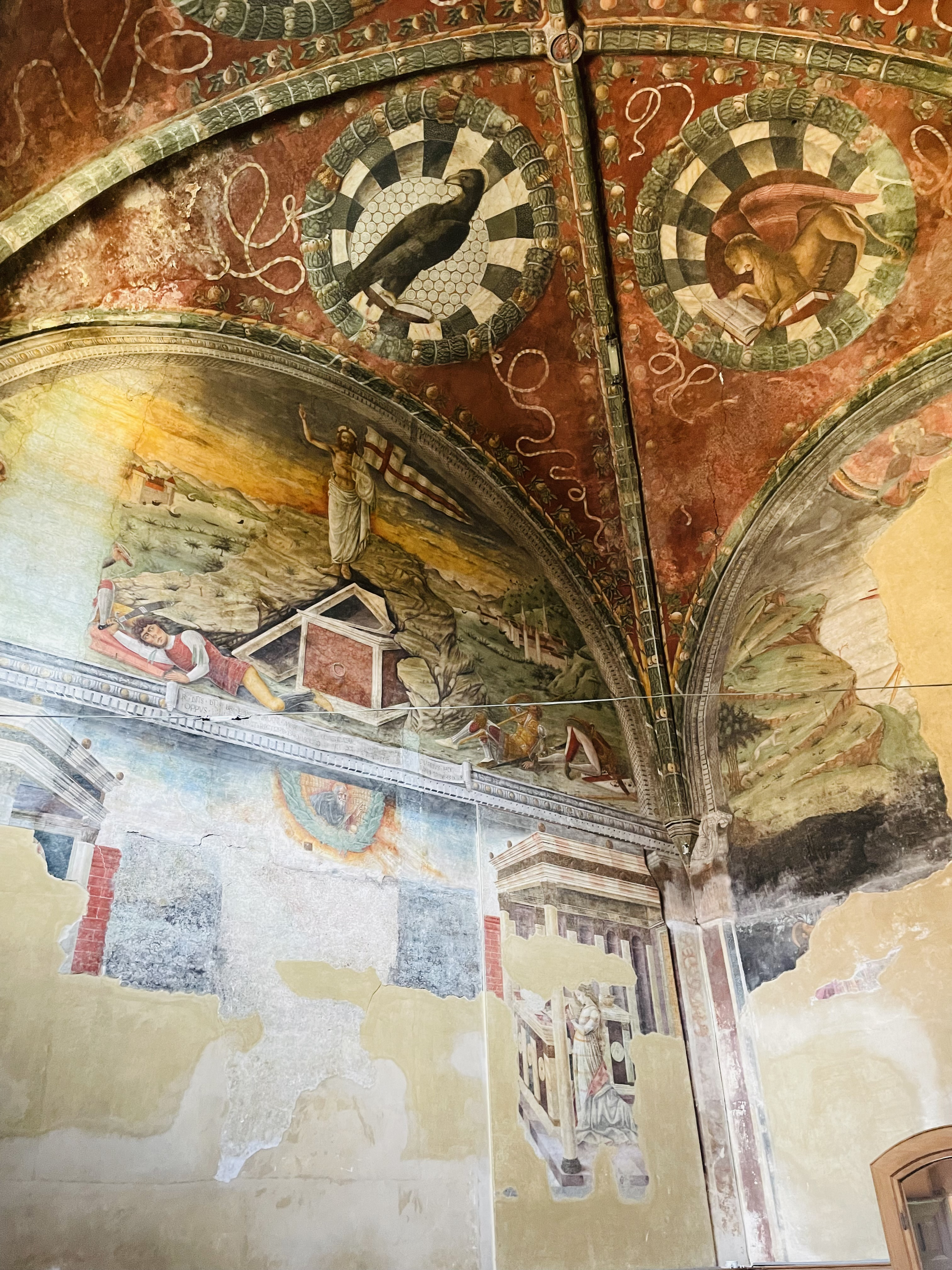
Pavia, Collegio Castiglioni Brugnatelli, frescoes in the chapel, 1475.

In 1473, he began directing the work to be done in the ducal chapel in the Castello Sforzesco. Only a few of the frescoes in the ducal chapel still survive today. It is difficult to determine the precise role Bembo played in the decoration of the chapel because he worked alongside several other artists, which would become a theme in his later life. In 1474, he worked on a chapel in the church of Santa Maria da Caravaggio alongside Giacomino Vincemala. He also worked closely with other associates on the polyptych in Pavia, where he worked with Vincenzo Foppa and Zanetto Bugatto. In 1476 he painted frescoes of The Procession of the Magi and the Annunciation in the Collegio Castiglioni Chapel, Pavia. His work for the Sforza court officially came to an end following the assassination of Galeazzo Sforza in 1477. He is also well known for his painting Jesus among the Doctors which hangs in the Pitti Palace in Florence.

== Authorship ==
Art historians believe his style improved over the years as he learned how to accurately represent space. Despite having a considerable number of works attributed to him, only the portraits of the Sforza family are surely his. There has been much debate over the authenticity of his works due to some of his earlier works being dissimilar from one another, as if they were done by different people. It is hard to assess the breadth of his work because of the predominance of the Bembo name in the region. In addition, given that Bonifacio only has two secured works, it is nearly impossible to determine his style with such a small sample size. Further investigation is needed before any conclusive claims can be made about the authenticity of his works. Many of his attributed works can be found in museums and galleries in Italy. His Coronation of the Virgin can be found in Cremona while his Drawings Illustrating the Story of Lancelot can be found in the library of Florence.

== Tarot cards ==
One of Bonifacio's best-known works is the deck of tarot cards he painted for Bianca Maria Visconti and Francesco Sforza in the mid-fifteenth century, probably after 1455. This deck is known as the Visconti-Sforza, or "Colleoni Tarot". Tarot cards began to appear a little before the mid-fifteenth century, making Bembo one of the first artists to paint a deck of them. Bianca Maria and her husband chose to have Bembo paint the cards because he was their favourite painter. In all, Bembo and his workshop must have painted seventy-eight cards of the full deck. However, the modelling of the putti on six trumps is different from Bembo's style, and they are believed to have been painted to replace lost cards. The old attribution to by Antonio Cicognara is now revised, for Franco dei Russi may well be the artist who painted them. Of these seventy-eight, four have been lost over the course of history: the Devil, the Tower, the Knight of Coins, and the Three of Swords. The Three of Swords was lost sometime after 1903 by Count Alessandro Colleoni, who had inherited seventy-five cards. The deck is composed of four main suits known as Swords (spade), Cups (coppe), Coins (denari), and Staves (bastoni). In addition, the deck had a fifth suit of twenty-one trumps and a wild card known as the Fool. Bembo and his assistants hand-painted each individual card with skill, managing to incorporate the Visconti motto into many cards of the four main suits. On the fifth suit, he managed to add Sforza devices. The deck is thought to have been painted around 1455, because Francesco Sforza's three-ring device can be found on the Emperor and Empress cards. Each card was painted and illuminated on heavy cardboard and measures 175 by 87 millimetres.

Given their beauty and elegance, the cards were very rarely played with, if at all, by the Sforza family, based on the relative wear and tear on the cards compared to other decks the family owned. Even today, the beauty of the cards has an impact on people. Italo Calvino wrote The Castle of Crossed Destinies based on the deck of cards Bembo created. Today, the cards can be found in two different places as the set has been broken up throughout the years. The Morgan Library & Museum, in New York, acquired 35 of the cards in 1911, and they have remained there ever since. At the Morgan Library, the cards are kept in transparent envelopes so they may be examined without handling them. They are also held in a fourteenth-century French casket-box decorated in relief with chivalric scenes. Thirteen cards are owned by the Colleoni family who inherited them from the Donati family, and are deposited in the Accademia Carrara in Bergamo. Finally, the Accademia Carrara owns the other 26 cards, which were bequeathed in 1900 to the institution by Francesco Baglioni, a friend of Count Colleoni, who had traded them with Colleoni.

== Sources ==
- Ticozzi, Stefano (1830). Dizionario degli architetti, scultori, pittori, intagliatori in rame ed in pietra, coniatori di medaglie, musaicisti, niellatori, intarsiatori d'ogni età e d'ogni nazione. Vol. 1. Milan: Gaetano Schiepatti. p. 140.
