= Benedetto Bembo =

Italian painter and miniaturist

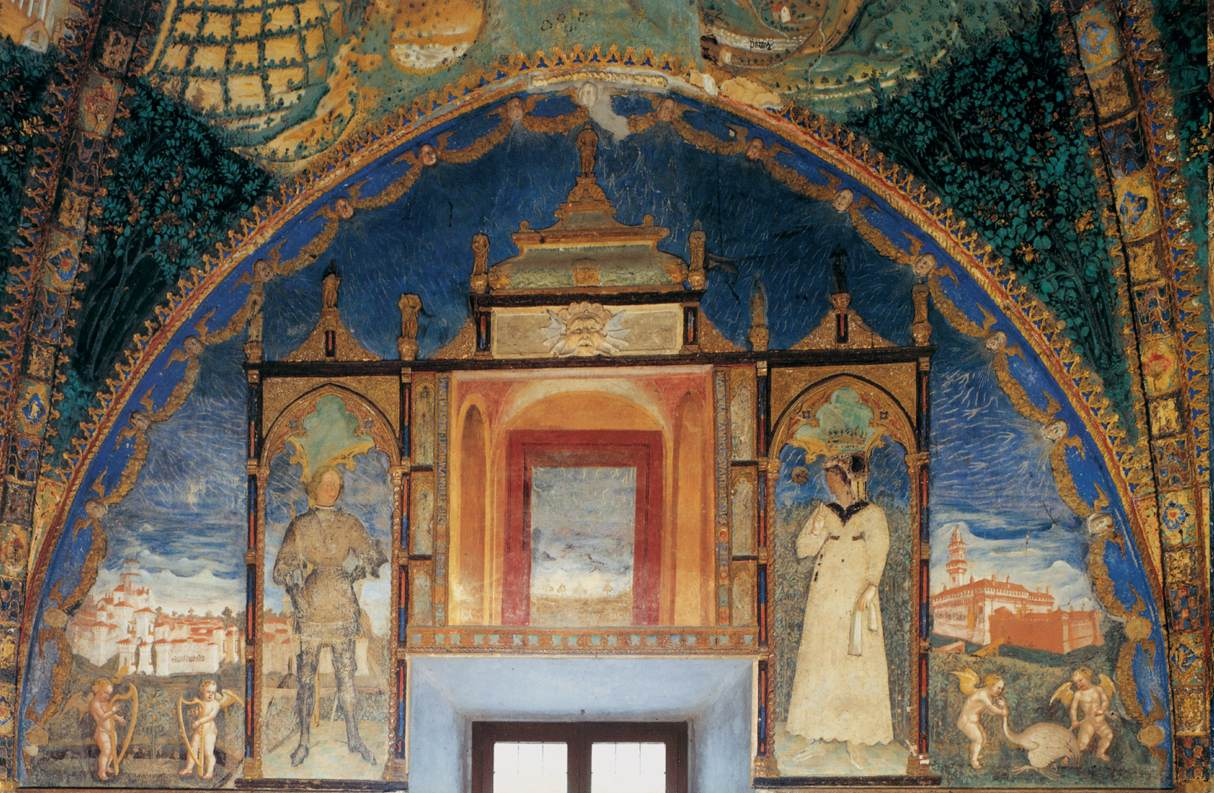
Frescoes of Pier Maria II de' Rossi and Bianca Pellegrini in the Castle of Torrechiara.

Benedetto Bembo (c. 1423 - 1489) was an Italian painter and miniaturist.

== Biography ==
Details of Bembo's life are scarce. He was likely born in Brescia, the son of one Giovanni from Cremona and the brother of painter Bonifacio Bembo.

His first known work is the Torrechiara Polyptich, of 1462, once housed in the San Nicodemo Chapel of the Castle of Torrechiara and later moved in the Art Gallery of the Castello Sforzesco in Milan. Bembo was also responsible of the decoration of the Camera d'Oro ("Golden Chamber") in the same castle: it is a fresco cycle, dating from around 1462, telling the amorous deeds of condottiero Pier Maria II de' Rossi (then owner of the building) and his lover Bianca Pellegrini. Another work is a panel of Madonna of Humility and Musician Angels (c. 1460) now in the Civic Museum Amedeo Lia of La Spezia.

== Sources ==
- Mazzini, Franco (1966). "Bembo, Benedetto". Dizionario Biografico degli Italiani. Vol. 8. Rome: Istituto dell'Enciclopedia Italiana.
