= Torrechiara Castle =

15th-century castle in Parma, Italy

Coordinates: 44°39′20″N 10°16′25″E

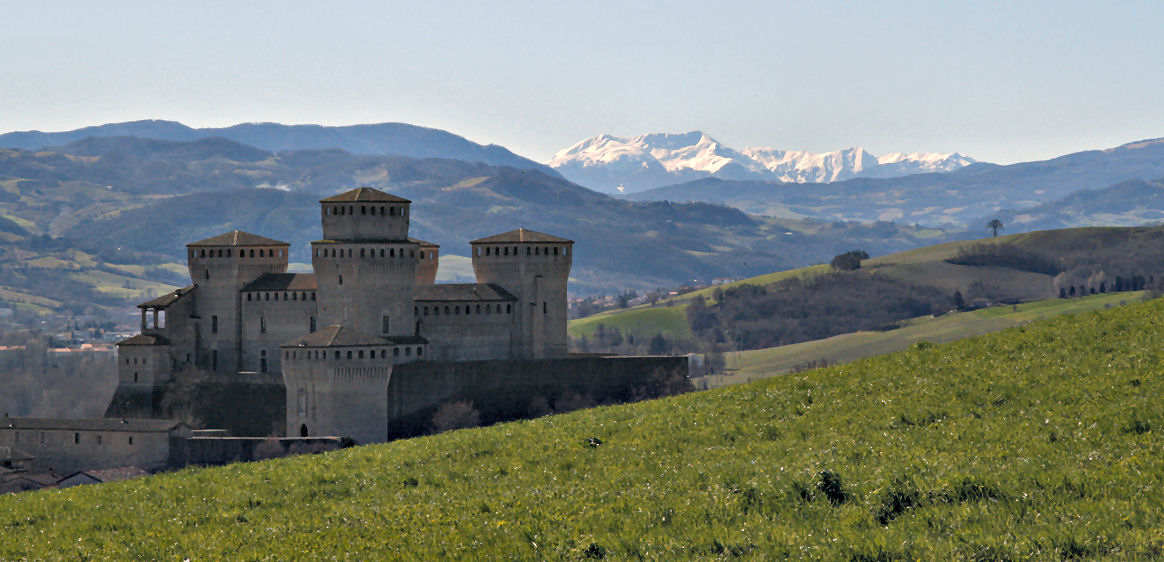
Castello di Torrechiara

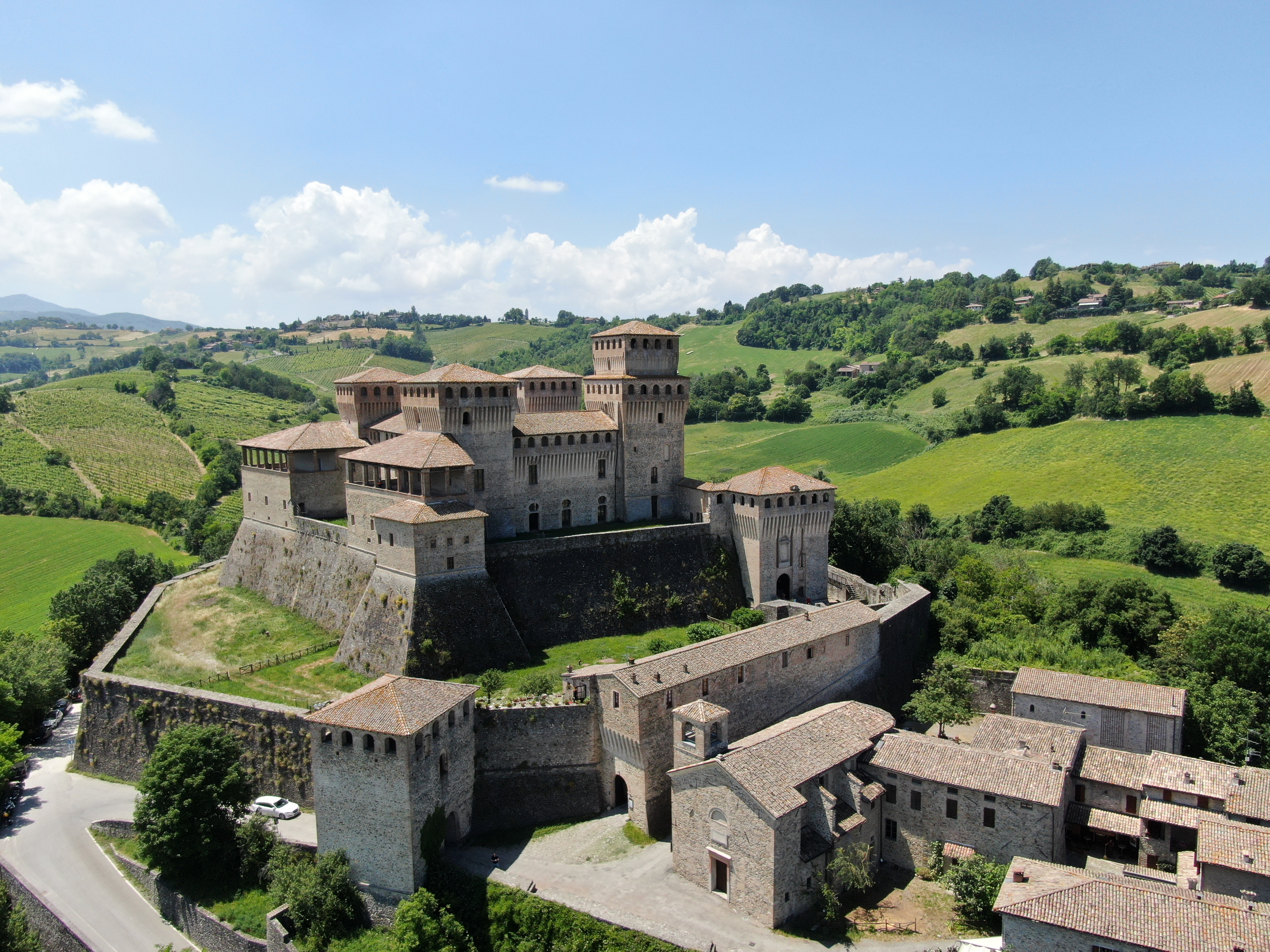
Castello di Torrechiara

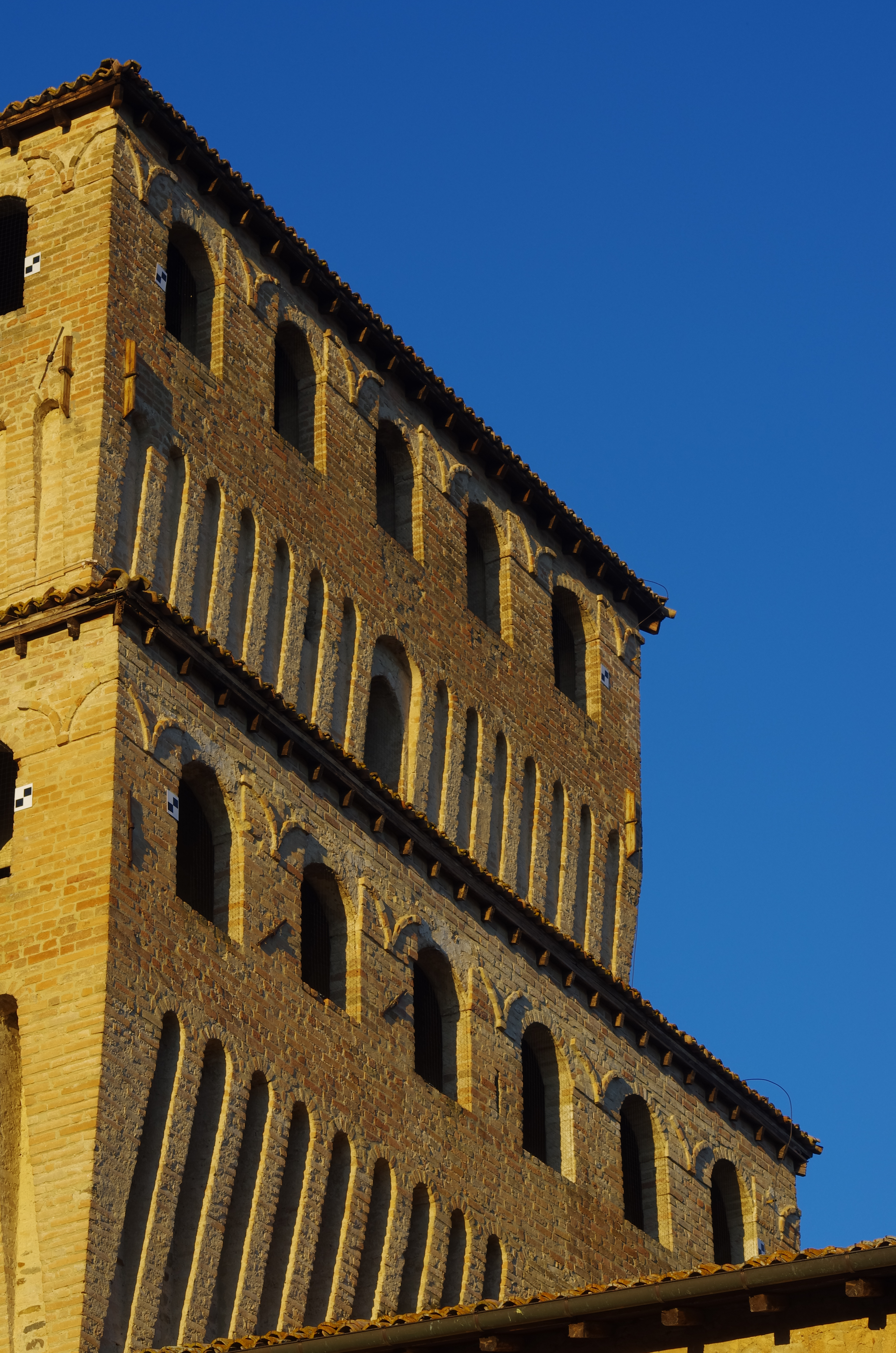
Facade detail

Torrechiara Castle (Italian: Castello di Torrechiara) is a 15th-century castle near Langhirano, in the province of Parma, northern Italy. It sits atop a terraced hill south of the city of Parma, in a strategic position overlooking the Parma River in the valley below. The castle was commissioned by Pier Maria II de' Rossi, the fourth count of San Secondo, and built between 1448 and 1460. The fortress shows the influence of the castles of the House of Sforza, particularly Visconti-Sforza Castle. The castle is managed by the Polo Museale dell'Emilia Romagna since 2015.

== History ==
The castle was built as a defensive fortification and as a noble residence for de Rossi's mistress, Bianca Pellegrini d'Arluno. Bianca died in Torrechiara around the year 1480. Pier Maria retired to Torrechiara in 1482, where he died later that year. They were both buried in the castle, in the Oratory of San Nicomede in the north-east tower.

The castle changed hands many times over the centuries until it was declared a national monument in 1911. The following year, it was purchased, unfurnished, by the Italian State, which opened it to the public.

A moderate earthquake of about 5.2 magnitude struck the region on December 23, 2008, causing significant damage to the castle, in particular to the external walls of the tower of San Nicomede, and to the battlement. Some of the rooms were closed to the public for structural renovations, completed in 2009. The oratory of San Nicomede was renovated on the ground level, where the collapsed roof slab had been rebuilt in the early 19th-century. On the main floor of the castle, the original Sala della Sera was rebuilt and restored, then placed at the end of the row of the Aurora, Meriggio and Vespro rooms. The castle reopened in July 2014.

== Architecture ==
The castle, of medieval origins but largely rebuilt in 1448–1460, has four rectangular towers, connected by a double line of merloned walls. The inner court is called Cortile d'onore ("Courtyard of Honour"). The towers are the following:

- Torre di San Nicomede, with the chapel of the same name. It guarded the plain towards Langhirano
- Torre del Giglio (Lily Tower), so called because it bore Bianca Pellegrini's coat of arms.
- Torre della Camera d'Oro (Tower of the Golden Chamber), with the bedchamber of Rossi and Pellegrini.
- Torre del Leone (Lion Tower), facing north, which is the keep of the castle. It takes its name from Rossi's coat of arms.

== Interior ==
The interior features numerous rooms decorated with fantastic, grotesque or naturalistic elements. On the first floor, together with the Salone dei Giocolieri ("Jugglers Hall"), is the Camera d'Oro ("Golden Bedchamber"), one of the most famous examples of bedchamber artistic decoration in Italy. The fresco cycle in the lunettes portrays Bianca Pellegrini running through her and Rossi's lands, searching for her lover: the paintings are attributed to Benedetto Bembo. The chamber opens onto a panoramic loggiato.

== In media ==
Scenes of the 1985 film Ladyhawke were shot at the castle.

== Nearby attractions ==
Other sights include the church of St. Lawrence and the Abbey of Santa Maria della Neve.

== Festivals and events ==
The Courtyard of Honour of the castle is the setting for the Torrechiara Festival, dedicated to the great soprano Renata Tebaldi.

== See also ==
- Castles of the Duchy
