= Abbey of Santa Maria della Neve =

Benedictine Monastery in Italy

Coordinates: 44.6576°N 10.2900°E

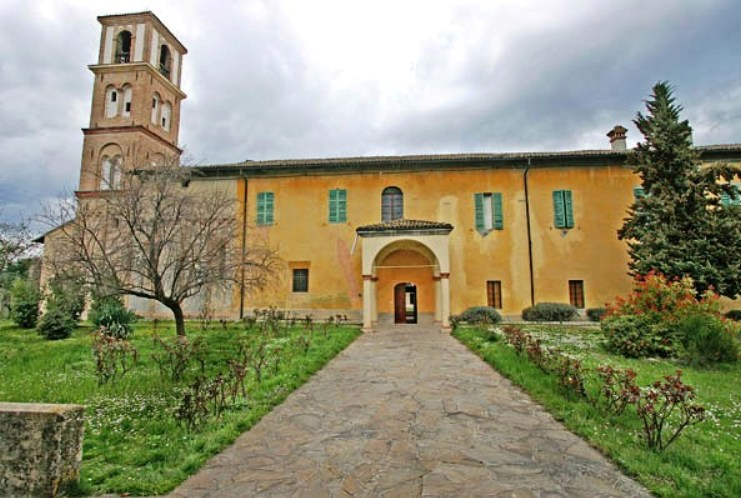

The Abbey of St Mary of the Snows (Badia di Santa Maria della Neve) is a Benedictine Monastery and church, located in a rural spot on Via Badia #28 in the frazione of Torrechiara and its castle, in the town limits of Langhirano, Province of Parma, Italy. The monastery is affiliated with the monastery of San Giovanni Evangelista, Parma.

== History ==
The construction of the initial abbey was commissioned circa 1471 by Count Pier Maria II De’ Rossi at the site of a medieval oratory or small church to house a Benedictine congregation derived from the Abbey of Santa Giustina. The Romanesque-style church with a single nave and attached bell-tower was dedicated to Sancta Maria ad Nives, a common Marian devotion. The facade faces east. The sacristy and church still retain frescoes.

The abbey was shuttered during the Napoleonic occupation, and requisitioned as a barracks. In 1899, it was returned to the Benedictines. The abbey staffed by nuns and oblates offers housing for retreats and a guesthouse for single visitors. Reservations can be made for lunch at the refectory. The abbey has a store that sells honey and products of the orchard.
