= Castiglione Olona =

- Comune
- Comune di Castiglione Olona
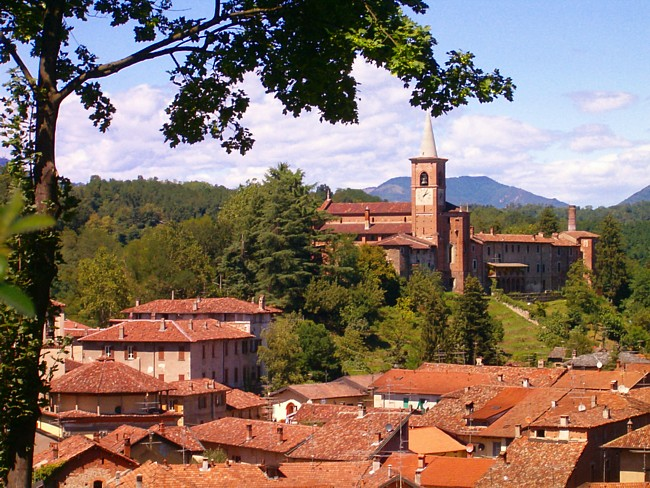

- Location within Italy Location within Lombardy
- Coordinates: 45°45′N 8°53′E
- Country: Italy
- Region: Lombardy
- Province: Varese (VA)
- Frazioni: Gornate Superiore, Caronno Corbellaro

Government
  - Mayor: Emanuele Poretti

Area
  - Total: 7 km^{2} (2.7 sq mi)
- Elevation: 307 m (1,007 ft)

Population (2015)
  - Total: 7,753
  - Density: 1,100/km^{2} (2,900/sq mi)
- Demonym: Castiglionesi
- Time zone: UTC+1 (CET)
  - Summer (DST): UTC+2 (CEST)
- Postal code: 21043
- Dialing code: 0331
- Website: Official website

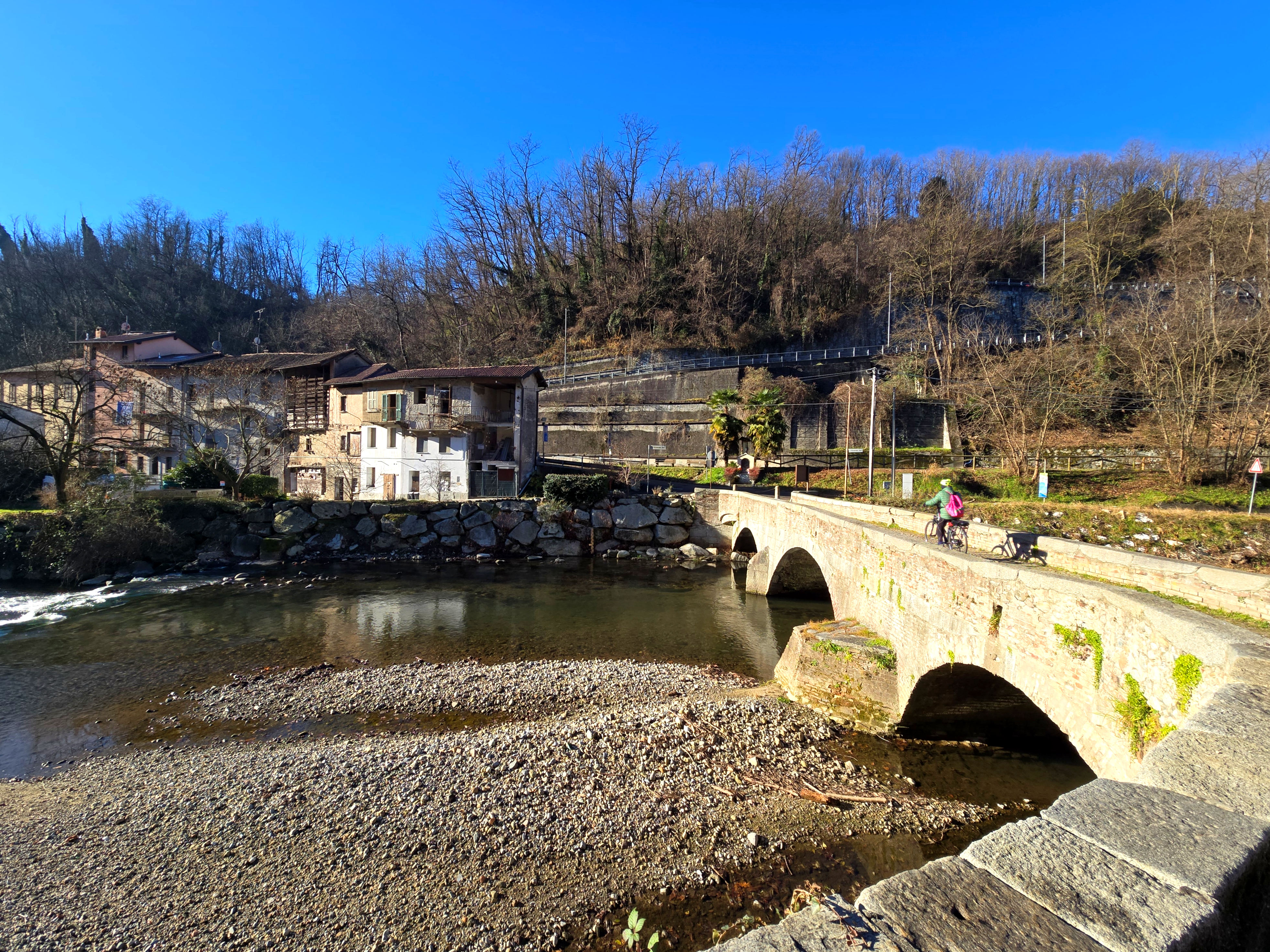
Castiglione Olona: medieval bridge over Olona river

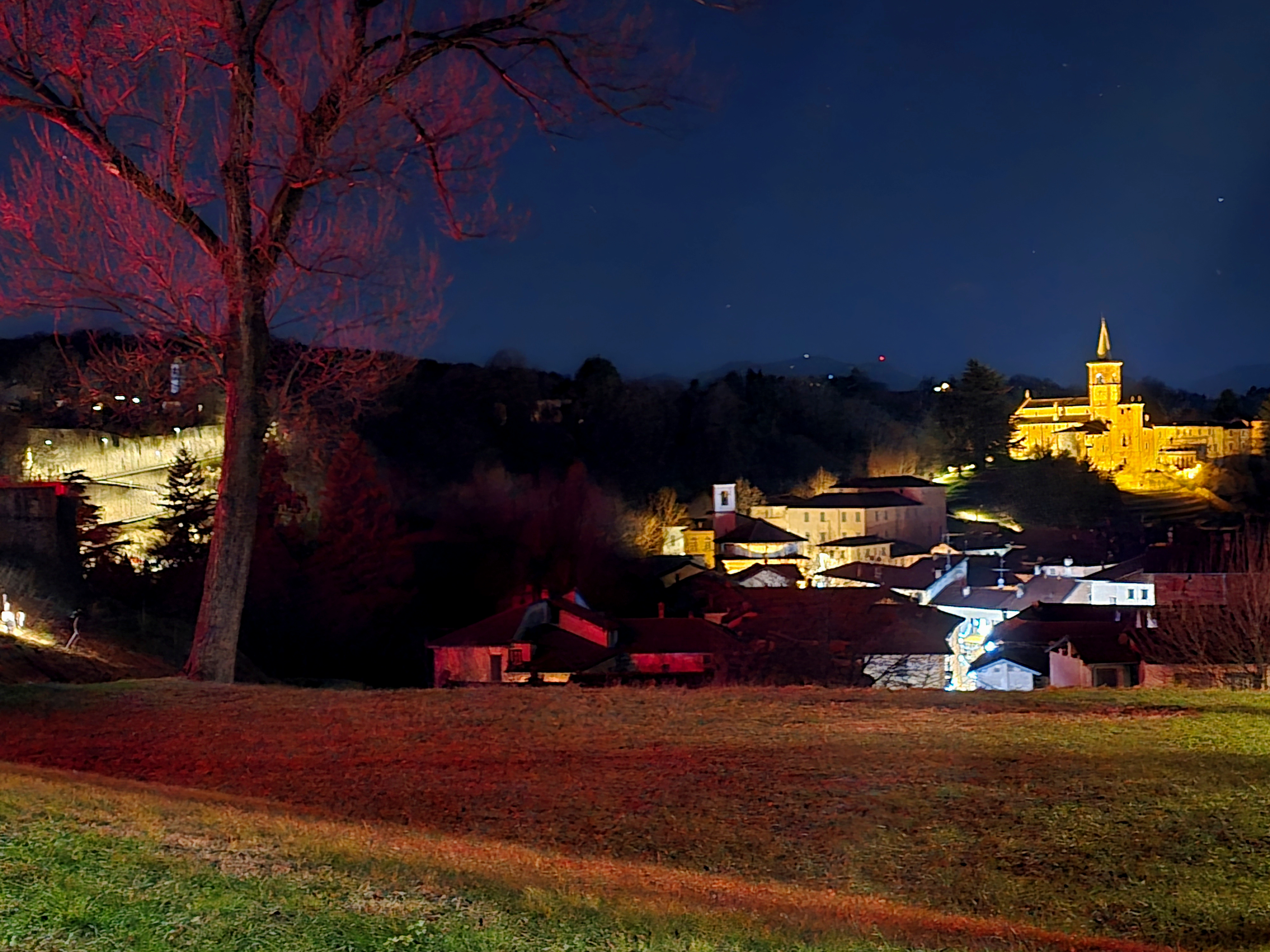
Castiglione Olona: Collegiata Church and Historic Center, seen from Monteruzzo Castle

Castiglione Olona is a town and comune in the province of Varese, in Lombardy. As of 31 December 2015, it has a population of 7,753 inhabitants.

The area of the town with the greatest tourist attractions is the historic center.

The entrance to the historic center is through two gates in the ancient medieval walls, both on the street Via Roma: the Western Gate, for the people arriving from the medieval bridge over the Olona River, and the Eastern Gate, for those arriving from the modern part of the town.

== History ==
The town of Castiglione Olona rose around the fifth century CE under the Roman Empire domain. Consequently, the Lombards entered and took possession of the village until the Castiglioni family became sole proprietor of the land around 1000 AC. The family engaged in many battles for the rule of the lands so they had walls built all around the village to protect themselves from enemies. Today only a small part of the walls near the fortress is visitable. In 1422, Cardinal Branda da Castiglione obtained the permission from Pope Martin V to build the church of Collegiata (Santi Stefano e Lorenzo); the church contains frescoes attributed to Masolino.

In the town, the 15th- and 16th-century palace of Cardinal Branda now serves as a museum, still contains a chapel and a number of frescoed walls, some attributed to Sienese painter Vecchietta.

The church of the Santissimo Corpo di Cristo, also known as the church of Villa, is located in G. Garibaldi square in the historic center. The building, constructed between 1437 and 1444 on the site of an ancient oratory of the 13th century dedicated to the Holy Sepulchre, declares a close descent from Brunelleschi's architectural models.

== Twin towns — sister cities ==
Castiglione Olona is twinned with:

- Étupes, France

== Sport ==
- The Varesina stadium complex and Stadio Comunale di Venegono is home to Varesina Sport CV SSD football team.
- The Moto Club Castiglione Olona organised motorcycle speedway and the track on Via Asiago. It hosted important events, including qualifying rounds of the Speedway World Team Cup in 1976 and 1980 and a qualifying round of the Speedway World Championship in 1978.

The site of the former track is the Varesina Sports Center, which today has two synthetic football pitches and a smaller covered indoor pitch.
