= Zanetto Bugatto =

Italian painter

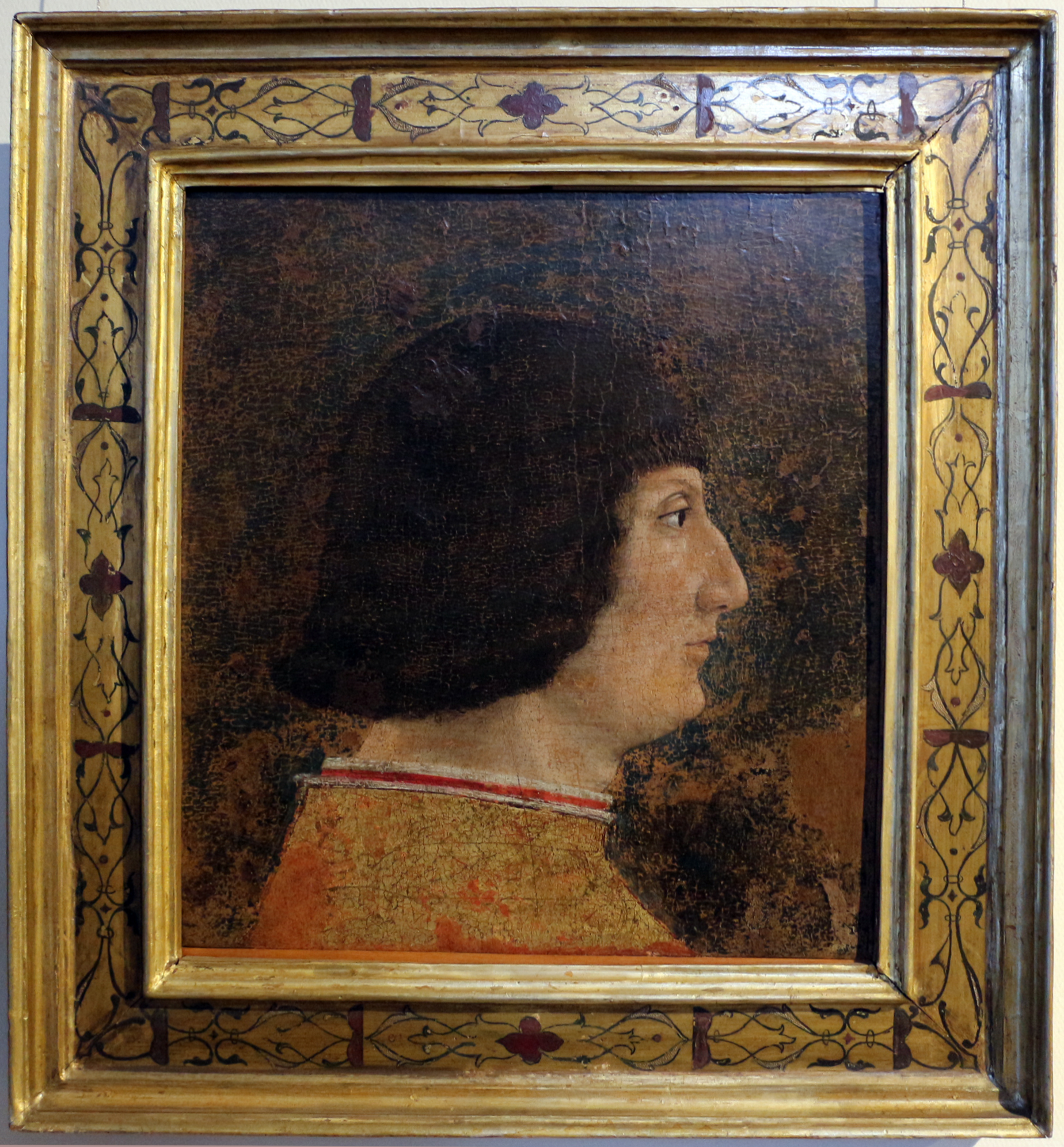
Portrait of Galeazzo Maria Sforza (attr.), 1474–76, Castello Sforzesco, Milan

Zanetto Bugatto (1433 in Milan – ~1476 in Pavia or Milan), also known as Zanetto Bugatti, was one of the most well-documented court portraitists of the 1400s. A key painter of the Lombardy region, Bugatto worked for 15 years for the first two Sforza Dukes of Milan, particularly Duke Galeazzo Maria Sforza and his Duchess Bona of Savoy. His work was influenced by northern artists such as Rogier van der Weyden, Andrea Mantegna, and Jean Fouquet, all of whom he met during his travels. Bugatto's work was described by Galeazzo's ambassador Leonardo Botta as being similar to Sicilian painter Antonello da Messina. It is not clear whether Bugatto painted works other than portraits which he typically made on panel and in fresco. He is notable for being one of the first Italian artists, along with Antonello da Messina, to focus on portraiture in the Netherlandish style to such an exclusive extent.

Bugatto is credited with establishing the official likenesses of Galeazzo Sforza and his wife Bona of Savoy through several portraits, medals, and coins. Though he has no surviving signed or directly accredited works, the unusual level of documentation from Bugatto's commissions with the Sforza has allowed art historians to attribute to Bugatto the ducal Portrait of Galeazzo Maria Sforza in the Castello Sforzesco (pictured at right). There is some debate over whether the 1467 ducat coins of Galeazzo Maria Sforza may also be Bugatto's work. Several other surviving works are argued to be either direct copies or heavily influenced by Bugatto's works. No surviving portraits or images of Zanetto Bugatto himself are known to exist.

== Biography ==
Born in Milan in 1433, little is known about Zanetto Bugatto's early life and childhood. The first documentation of Bugatto's work are recorded in Milan Cathedral's account books for a small commission for a procession in 1458. In 1460 Bugatto painted his first commission for the Milan court, a portrait of Ippolita Sforza, the eldest daughter of his patrons Francesco and Bianca Maria Sforza, who was considered marriageable and needed a portrait to be sent to her potential husband. After this work, Bugatto was sent to Brussels from 26 December 1460 to May 1463 to study under Flemish painter Rogier van der Weyden. Bugatto was also given a stipend to work for Philip the Good, Duke of Burgundy.

After his return to Milan Bugatto began to work more for his patron Galeazzo Maria Sforza, the son of Bianca Maria and new Duke with Bianca Maria as regent. Zanetto's commissions begin to reflect the wide array of contracts expected from a court portraitist of the time. Bugatto worked not only as a painter but as a designer of medals and coins, including designing the portraiture used on ducats with Duke Galeazzo and regent Bianca. In particular, Bugatto is arguably credited with designing or overseeing the official image of Galeazzo in 1467 for a new series of ducats which were to have only the Duke in preparation for his investiture.

In 1468, Bugatto was sent to Paris to paint a portrait of Bona of Savoy, sister of the Queen of France Charlotte of Savoy, and intended bride of Galeazzo Maria Sforza. The trip to Paris was also financially beneficial for Zanetto Bugatto, who brought with him a portrait of Francesco and Galeazzo Maria Sforza, which he sold to King Louis XI of France.

From 12 November 1470 to 3 March 1471, upon his return to Milan, Bugatto was involved as a designer in the creation of ten solid gold medals for the Duke and Duchess of Milan.

In 1471 Duke Galeazzo and Duchess Bona of Savoy spent a month-long visit in Mantua where they sent for Bugatto to meet them. They spent three days in Mantua, arriving on 19 July 1471 and leaving two days later. While there Bugatto saw and studied the artist Andrea Mantegna's work.

In 1472 Bugatto worked with Bonifacio Bemo and Leonardo Ponzoni to create his last known completed work, frescos in the Santa Maria delle Grazie located outside of Vigevano. The chapel is now destroyed. In 1473 Bugatto was commissioned to paint a portrait of Duke Galeazzo, Bona of Savoy, and their child for the choir of San Celso, Milan.

It is assumed Bugatto died in 1476, though the exact date, how, and where remain unknown. Records remain of him up to 1476 and it is known that in this year Galeazzo attempted to find a replacement court portraitist. At the suggestion of his ambassador in Venice, Leonardo Botta, Galeazzo wrote to hire Antonello da Messina who also worked in the Flemish-style as Bugatto did. However, the Duke was assassinated in 1476 shortly after and there is no record of da Messina ever accepting Galeazzo's patronage.

== Education ==
Bugatto studied for three years under Rogier van der Weyden in Brussels and his Flemish-influenced figures and landscape backgrounds reflect the blend of Netherlandish and Italian styles that interested his patrons. The Brussels Guild would not allow a master painter to take more than one apprentice at a time, so it is likely that Bugatto studied as a journeyman apprentice under van der Weyden, a position which was less restricted. Initially van der Weyden and Bugatto argued frequently, causing Bugatto to leave the studio for a time until then Dauphin of France- the later King Louis XI- intervened. As an assistant Bugatto likely worked on underdrawings for commissions, designing and painting patterns, and eventually taking more responsibility for entire commissions. Bugatto was likely heavily influenced by van der Weyden's style of painting, as can be seen in later attributed works such as the ex-Treccani fragment, in which he combines Italian styles such as the profile and dark shading with Rogier-like elongation of the figure, definition of facial features, and patterning of the background. Upon his return to Milan in 1463 the Sforza noticed van der Weyden's influence on Bugatto's painting and on 7 May 1463, Duchess Bianca Maria Visconti wrote a letter of thanks to Rogier, showing interest in Northern European art styles. It has been suggested that the Duke and Duchess of the younger Duchy of Milan may have been interested in copying some of the detail and smooth styles of court portraiture from the more developed Netherlandish tradition.

Bugatto is also known to have been influenced by other important artists of the time during his travels. While in France painting the commission of Bona of Savoy Bugatto may have seen and been influenced by Jean Foquet and other French artists’ works.

When the ducal couple Duke Galeazzo and Bona of Savoy visited the Gonzagas in 1471 they would have seen the Camera dipinta and portraits of the Gonzagas done by Andrea Mategna, which established him as a portraitist of repute whom they would be interested in having their own portraitist study. In a letter from 26 July 1471, Duke Galeazzo sent for Zanetto Bugatto to come from Milan to Gonzaga. A week later Ludovico Gonzaga called Mantegna to Gonzaga along with two portraits and ordered him to take Bugatto to Mantua to meet and learn. Some historians think Gonzaga may have been interested in having his own portraitist Mantegna meet Bugatto because of the gold portrait medals which Bugatto designed of the Sforzas as presents for Gonzaga. When he travelled to Gonzaga, Bugatto met Andrea Mantegna in Mantua. It is thought that Bugatto would have studied Mategna's frescos and portraits at the Camera degli Sposi in the Palazzo Ducale, Mantua. Historians hypothesize there would have been a mix of competition and respect between the two artists, but no records detailing how their interaction went exist.

== Works ==
Detailed records of expenditures, receipts, and letters from Duke Galeazzo Sforza and the many people of his court remain today. From these records, much is known about the art commissioned by Galeazzo Sforza and thus the art of Zanetto Bugatto even if most of Bugatto's art no longer remains today. In modern times only one verified work of Bugatto remains, Portrait of Galeazzo Maria Sforza which currently resides in the Castello Sforzesco. Some historians argue that a second work, the portrait of Galeazzo Sforza on the ducal coins of 1467, can be credited to Bugatto as well, however, there is still debate over the true source of this work.

=== 1467 Ducats of Galeazzo Sforza ===
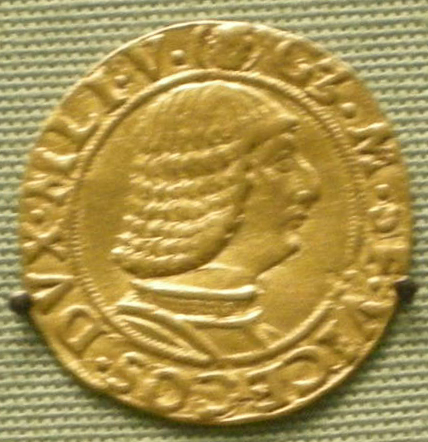
Ducat coin of Galeazzo Maria Sforza, portrait arguably attributed to Zanetto Bugatto.

During the late 1460s, Duke Galeazzo Maria Sforza was going through a series of financial difficulties. Despite this, Sforza wanted to leave a powerful legacy as Duke of Milan and set about commissioning a new set of ducal coins with his likeness. In a letter from the master of the Milanese mint dated to 4 March 1467 Zanetto Bugatto is mentioned as having been commissioned to be involved with this series of ducats. The letter asks the duke for the lettering to be used for the new coins as the master of the mint was concerned they would not be able to finish the minting in time for the Duke's investiture on 15 March. In this letter, the master of mint mentions the design of his likeness being finished after meeting with a committee of artists including Bugatto and the engraver. There is some debate however among art historians as to which of two surviving coins this letter is referring to, or if Bugatto was even the artist of either of these coins at all. Some historians point out that the portrait of the Duke on both coins lacks certain Flemish influences from Rogier that were key in Bugatto's works. They use this lack of influence to argue that another unnamed artist actually created the portraiture of the coins. Alternately then, these historians interpret Bugatto not as the designer of the portraiture of the coin, but as an official council court portraitist to ensure that the likeness was close enough to Galeazzo to establish the coin as a cypher of rule. Some examples of the coin thought most likely to be the one Bugatto was involved survive to this day. The coin was minted out of solid gold with a small image of a young Duke Galeazzo in the middle surrounded by a 22-letter inscription.

=== 1470 Sforza medals ===
Of the ten medals Bugatto designed for the Sforzas, five held the portrait of Galeazzo and five held a portrait of Bona of Savoy. Records indicate that these medals were extremely expensive, almost life-sized and made of solid gold; costing nearly 10,000 ducats to make each. Together with Francesco da Mantova and Maffio Civate, the mould-maker and goldsmith respectively, Zanetto created the medals based on the likeness of the Duke and Duchess at that point. Records from the notary Lorenzo Costa at the Genoa mint in 1495, after the death of Galeazzo and the exit of Bona, indicate that Zanetto signed the back of at least one of the gold medals of Bona, accrediting the design of the portrait to him. None of these medals survive today and what we know of them is from records of expenditures.

=== Frescoes and Altarpieces ===
Many of the account books from the court of Duke Galeazzo indicate that Bugatto was commissioned several times to collaborate on frescoes for several chapels in Milan and Pavia. Though none of Bugatto's frescoes remain and some of the ones he was commissioned to create never went past initial sketches, it is known frescoes were one of Bugatto's main forms of art. It is thought he may have specialized in creating donor figures, or smaller portraits of the patrons of a fresco who would be depicted in the larger work.

In 1465, along with Giacomo da Lodi, he made estimates for the quality of the frescoes by Giacomo Vismara and the Zavattari for the presbytery of the church of San Vincenzo in Prato, Milan.

In 1472 Bugatto was commissioned along with Bonifacio Bembo and Leonardo Ponzoni to create a series of frescoes for Santa Maria delle Grazie outside Vigevano where the ducal family were depicted among religious scenes.

One of Bugatto's final works was a family portrait to be placed in the choir of San Celso of Milan. This portrait consisted of Duke Galeazzo, Duchess Bona of Savoy, and one of their children.

In 1474 Bugatto competed with Bembo and Vincenzo Foppa for a contract to paint the frescoes and the altarpiece at the chapel in the Castello Sforza in Pavia. Records remain of the three artists' suggestions for the altarpiece frame though they did not have plans drawn up for the altarpiece itself as Galeazzo had not yet decided which saints he wanted painted on the altarpiece. Shortly before he died, Bugatto collaborated with these same two artists at Santa Giacomo fuori Pavia to work on a fresco cycle of the Life of Christ. This work was full of conflicts as Duke Galeazzo was under considerable financial strain at this time and sought ways to cut costs.

=== Works Influenced by and Associated with Bugatto ===
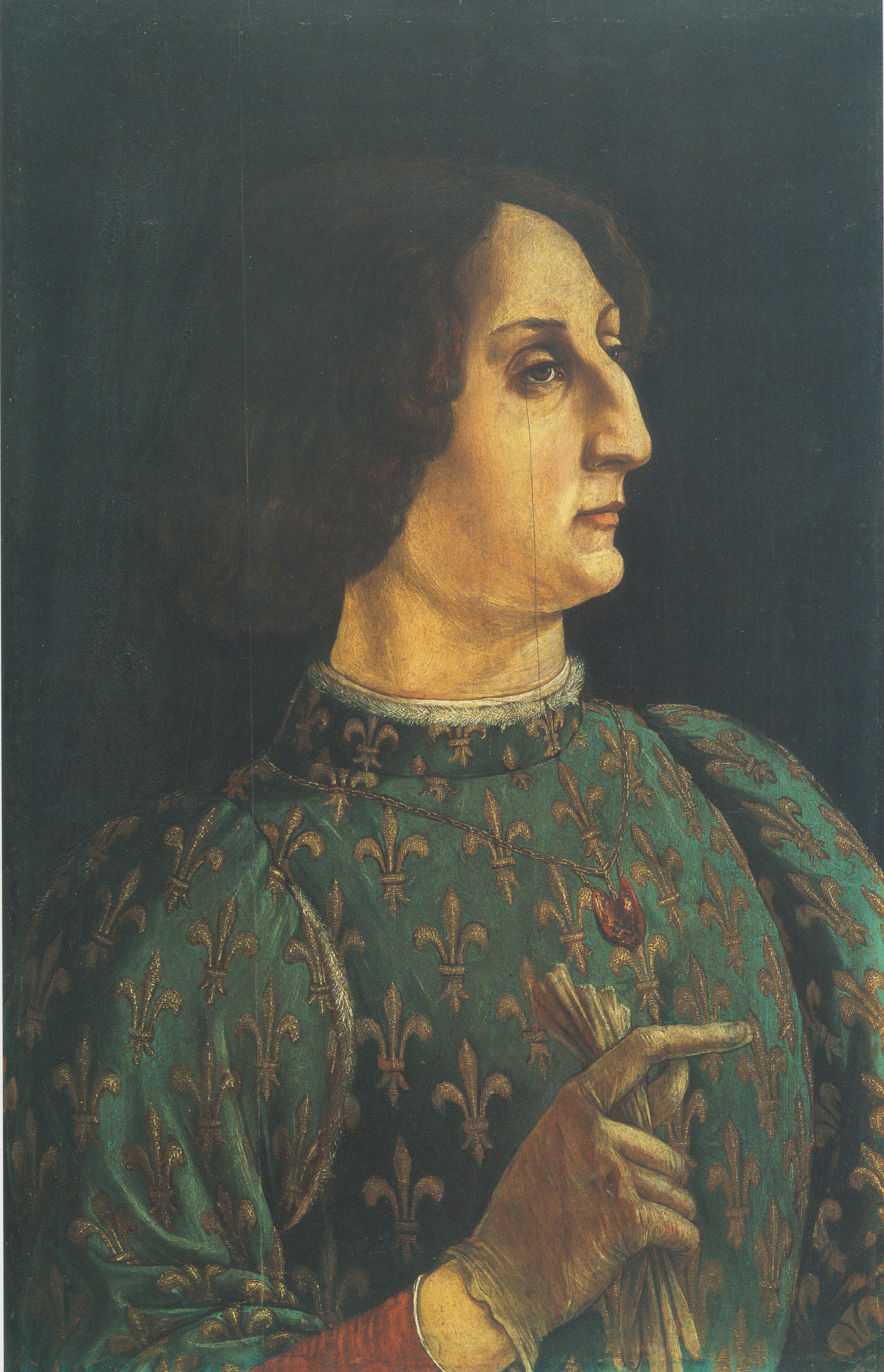
Portrait of Galeazzo Maria Sforza by Piero Pollaiuolo in the Uffizi Galleries

Some works survive which, though not made by Bugatto himself, are theorized by historians to be either heavily influenced by his work or be direct copies of his portraits.

The Uffizi Portrait of Galeazzo Maria Sforza by Piero Pollaiuolo is one such piece. When Galeazzo visited Lorenzo Medici in Florence from 15 to 18 March 1471, it was a very important and celebrated event. Though Lorenzo Medici would have wanted a portrait of the Duke to commemorate the visit, there likely would have not been time for him to sit for one. Because of this, some historians suggest that Pollaiuolo's portrait was made based on Bugatto's work which may have either been loaned to the Medici's or shown to Pollaiuolo on a visit to Milan. These historians point to the Rogierian influence of this portrait as evidence that it may be based on Bugatto's work.

Several historians have associated other works with Bugatto and his travels due to the characteristics of Rogier-like Flemish portraits mixed with the northern Italian influences of Bugatto. However, none of the following works have been definitively attributed to Bugatto and all are strongly contested among art historians. Some of these arguably associated works include Portrait of a Young Man (Châteauroux, Mus. B.-A.), Virgin with Symbols of the Passion (Paris, priv. col), a panel of St Jerome (Bergamo, Gal. Accad. Carrara). Some scholars have also attributed two works, Virgin and Child and Galeazzo Maria Sforza (Gazzada, Mus. Villa Cagnola).
