= Masolino da Panicale =

Italian painter (c. 1383 – c. 1447)

Masolino
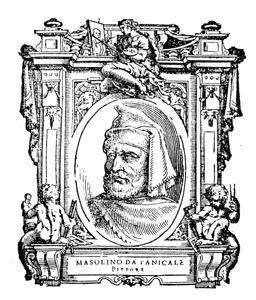
- Posthumous portrait of Masolino from a 1568 edition of The Lives
- Born: Tommaso di Cristoforo Fini c. 1383; Panicale, Lordship of Perugia
- Died: c. 1447 (aged 63–64); Florence, Republic of Florence
- Known for: Painting, fresco
- Notable work: frescoes in the Brancacci Chapel
- Movement: Italian Renaissance
- Patrons: Pipo of Ozora; Cardinal Branda Castiglione

Tommaso di Cristoforo Fini (c. 1383 – c. 1447), known by his nickname Masolino da Panicale (lit. 'Tommy from Panicale'), was an Italian painter. His best known works are probably his collaborations with Masaccio: Madonna with Child and St. Anne (1424) and the frescoes in the Brancacci Chapel (1424–1428).

== Biography ==
Masolino was possibly born in Panicale, present-day Umbria. He may have been an assistant to Ghiberti in Florence between 1403 and 1407. In 1423, he joined the Florentine guild Arte dei Medici e Speziali (Doctors and Apothecaries), which included painters as an independent branch. He may have been the first artist to create oil paintings in the 1420s, rather than Jan van Eyck in the 1430s, as was previously supposed. He spent many years traveling, including a trip to Hungary from September 1425 to July 1427 under the patronage of Pipo of Ozora, a mercenary captain. He was selected by Pope Martin V (Oddone Colonna) on the return of the papacy to Rome in 1420 to paint the altarpiece for his family chapel in the Basilica of Santa Maria Maggiore, and later by Cardinal Branda da Castiglione to paint the Saint Catherine Chapel in the Basilica of San Clemente, Rome. In the interim, he collaborated with his younger colleague, Masaccio, to paint the frescoes in the Brancacci Chapel in the Basilica of Santa Maria del Carmine, Florence, which were much admired by fellow artists throughout the fifteenth century. He painted a cycle of 300 famous historical figures in the Orsini Palace in Rome about 1433–34 and also worked in Todi. He spent his later years, after 1435, working for Cardinal Branda Castiglione in Castiglione Olona, painting the baptistery and apse of the Collegiata.

== Early use of the central vanishing point ==
Masolino was probably the first painter to make use of a central vanishing point in his 1423 painting St. Peter Healing a Cripple and the Raising of Tabitha.

== St Catherine Refusing to Worship Idols ==
"The lunette of the left-hand wall, depicting St Catherine Refusing to Worship Idols. In an elaborate temple setting, Catherine is pointing toward heaven, while the emperor, here bareheaded, gazes up at the idolatrous statue atop the altar. His retainers are crowded behind them, one of them, only partially visible, is sounding a trumpet."

== Summary of work ==
Section includes external links to works of art.

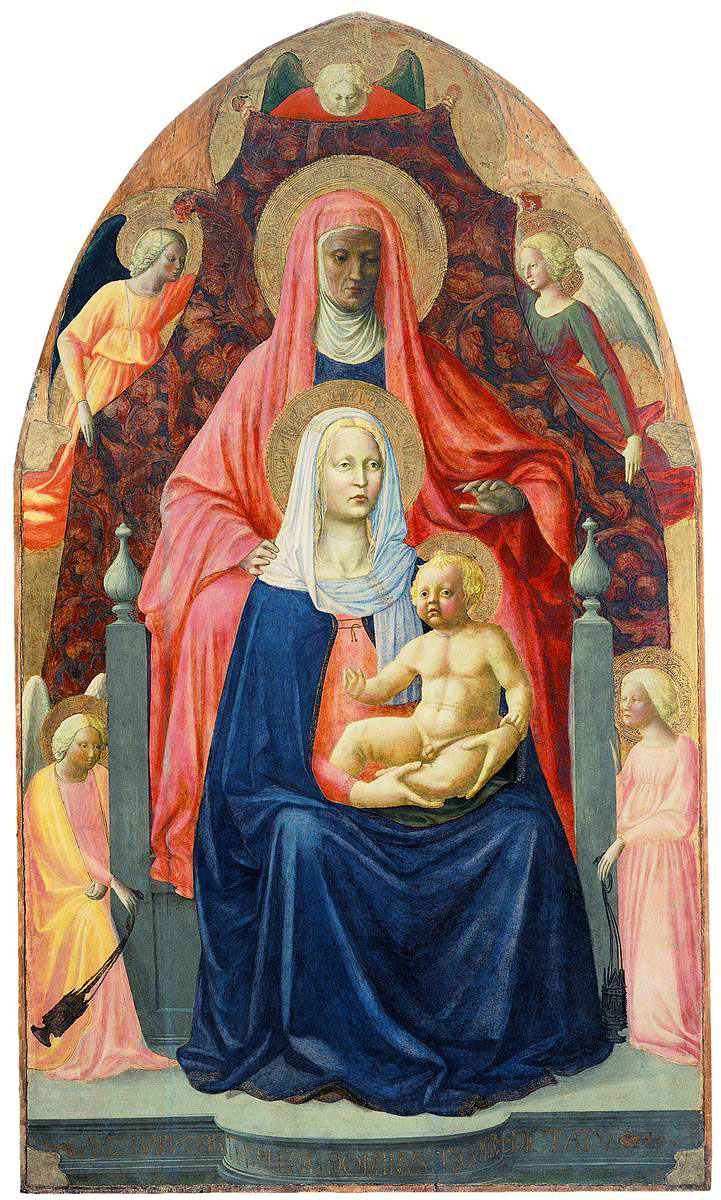
Madonna and Child, Saint Anne and the Angels

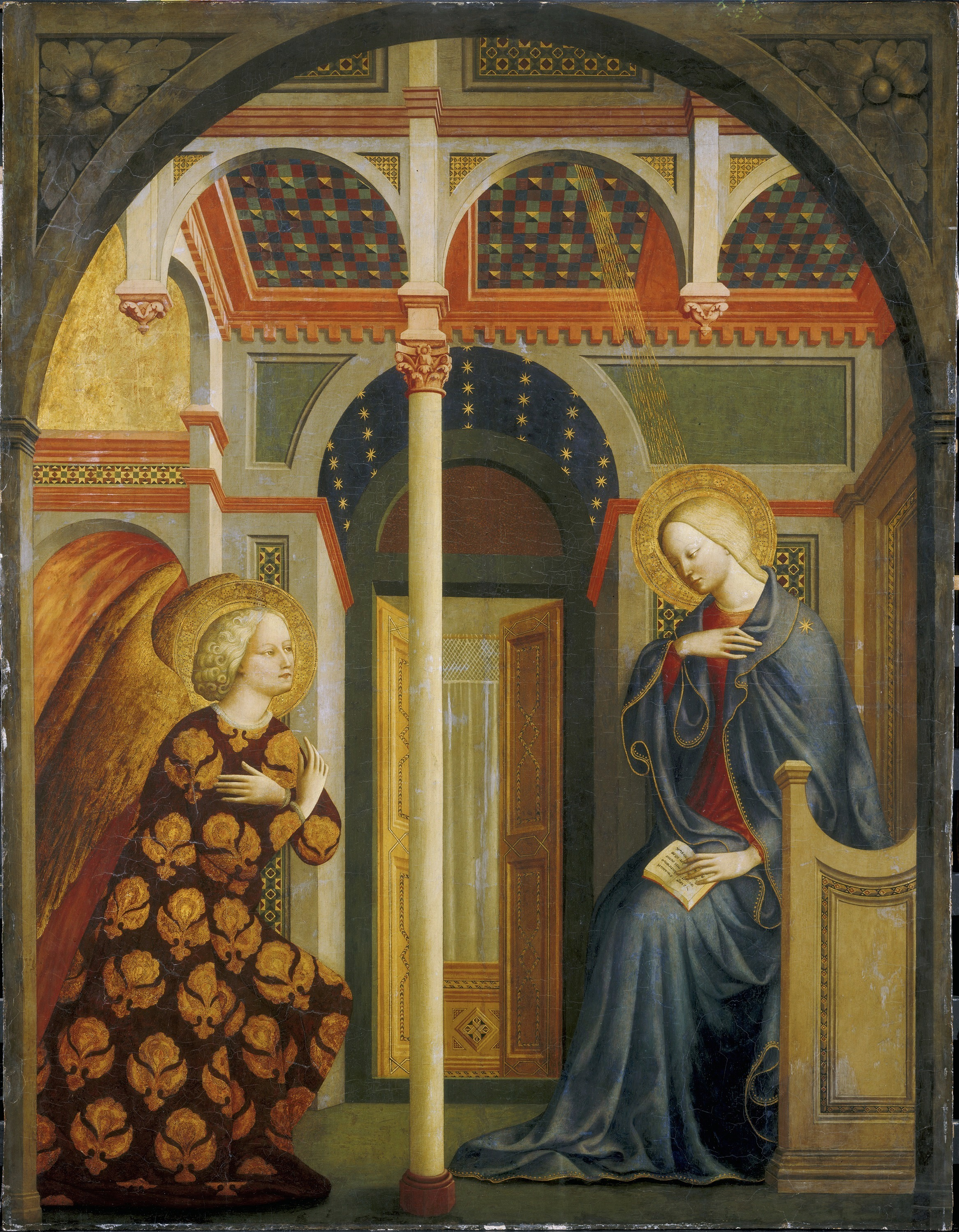
The Annunciation, National Gallery of Art

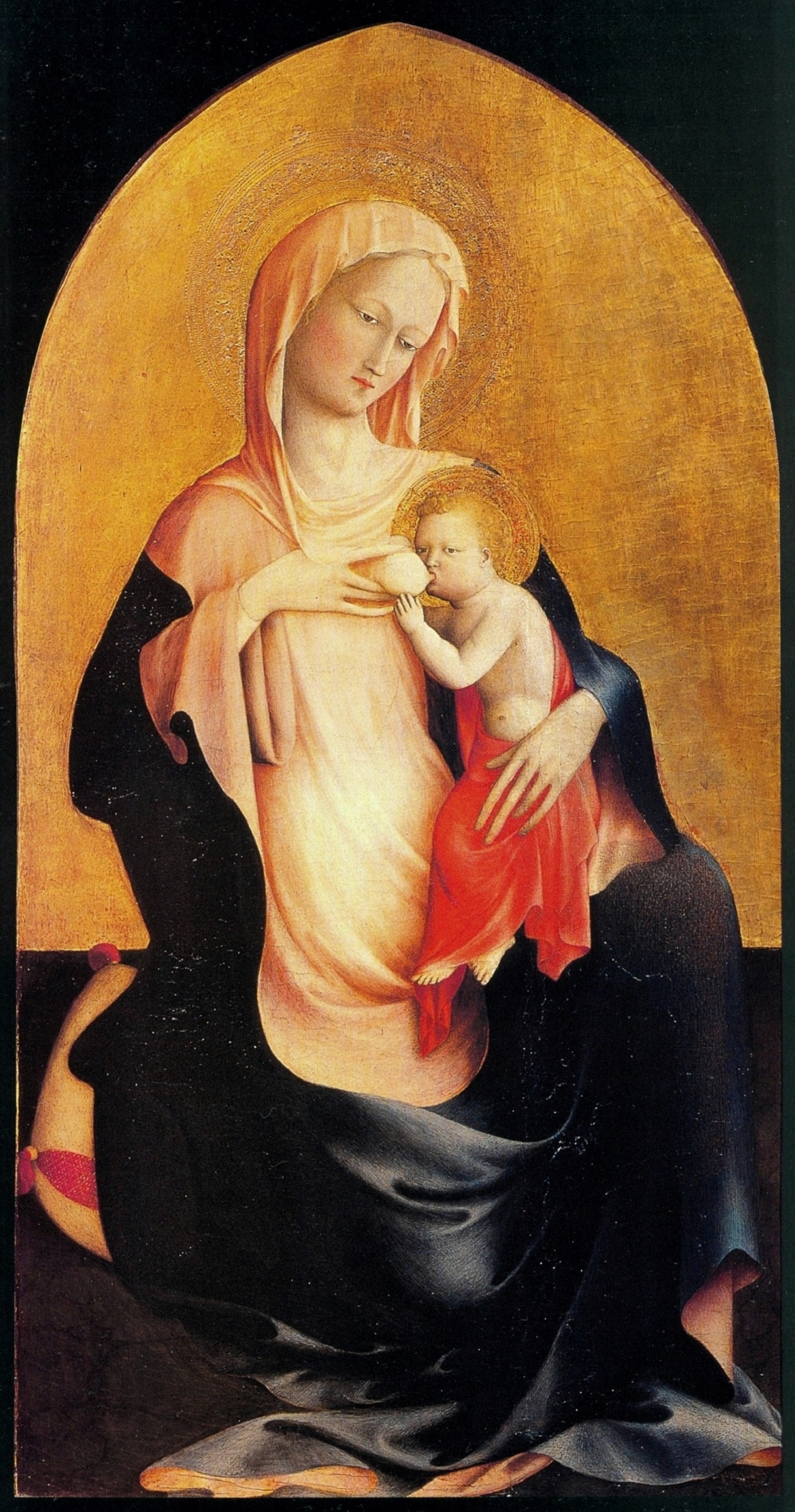
Madonna dell'Umiltà c. 1423, Tempera on wood, Uffizi Florence

Complete works
In Naples:

- Miracle of the Snow, triptych, commissioned by Branda da Castiglione for the dedication of the Basilica of St Mary Major, ca. 1423, National Museum and Gallery of Capodimonte.

In Germany:

- Madonna and Child, tempera on wood, Alte Pinakothek.
- Madonna and Child (1423), tempera on panel in Kunsthalle Bremen.

In Florence:

- Cappella Brancacci: cycle of frescoes in collaboration with Masaccio, 1424.
- Madonna and Child, Saint Anne and the Angels, collaboration with Masaccio, tempera on wood, 1424, Uffizi, Florence.
- Madonna dell'Umiltà, tempera on wood, 1430–35, Uffizi.

In Empoli:

- Cristo in Pietà, detached fresco, 1424, Empoli, museum of the Collegiata di Sant'Andrea.
- Saint Ivo and the Pupils, fresco, 1424, Empoli, Church of Saint Steven.
- Virgin and Child, fresco, 1424, Empoli, Church of Saint Steven.

In Rome:

- Fresco of the Life of St Catherine of Alexandria commissioned by Branda da Castiglione in the Basilica di San Clemente, Chapel of Sacrament, 1428.
- Fresco of the Annunciation in the Basilica di San Clemente, Chapel of Sacrament, 1428.
- Fresco of St Christopher in the Basilica di San Clemente, Chapel of Sacrament, 1428.
- Death of the Virgin and Crucifixion, fresco, Pinacoteca Vaticana.

In Castiglione Olona, where his patron was cardinal Branda da Castiglione:

- Hungarian Landscape in the Palazzo Branda Castiglione.
- Story of the Virgin (1435) in the Collegiata.
- Frescoes depicting the Life of St. John the Baptist (1435) in the Baptistery of Castiglione Olona.

In France:

- Scenes from the Legend of Saint Julian the Hospitaller, tempera on wood, 21 x 39 cm, Musée Ingres.

In the United States:

- Annunciation (1425–1430) oil and tempera on wood 148 x 115 cm, National Gallery of Art, Washington, D.C.
- The Archangel Gabriel and The Virgin Annunciate, both ca. 1430, tempera (?) on panel, National Gallery of Art.

Dispersed pieces of works

- Lateral panels of an altarpiece with The Ascension at the center, from Santa Maria Maggiore, Rome, ca. 1427–28, started by Masaccio and completed by Masolino after his death: Saints John the Evangelist(?) and Martin of Tours, Saints Paul and Peter, Philadelphia Museum of Art; Pope Gregory the Great (?) and Saint Matthias, National Gallery, London; The Ascension National Museum and Gallery of Capodimonte, Naples.
