= Collegio Castiglioni Brugnatelli =

College in Pavia

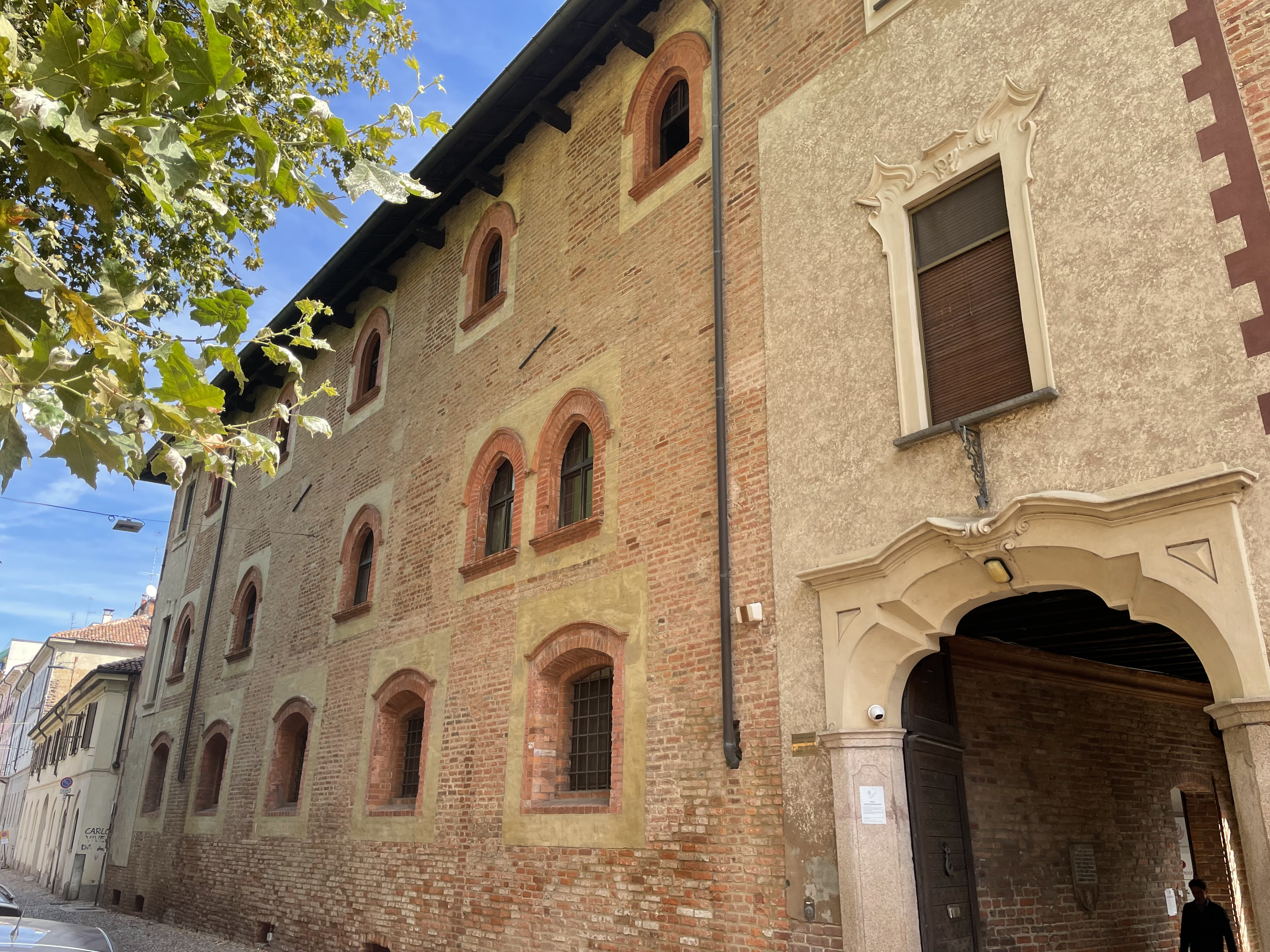
- The facade of the college
- Type: Institution for High Cultural Qualification
- Established: 1429
- Affiliations: University of Pavia
- Chairman: Francesco Rigano
- Rector: Michaela Magliacani
- Students: 156
- Location: Pavia, Italy; 45.1871°N 9.1613°E
- Campus: 1

The Castiglioni College can be considered the oldest university college in Pavia. It was founded by Cardinal Branda da Castiglione in 1429.

== History ==
In 1429 Cardinal Branda da Castiglione, who had studied at the University of Pavia, decided to found a college in the city that was initially to host 24 poor but deserving students: 18 Italians and six foreigners. The same cardinal also wrote the first statutes of the college, which were approved by Pope Martin V. Furthermore, Branda da Castiglione also managed to obtain privileges from both the pope and the emperor Sigismund, including an exemption from taxes for both the college and his students. In addition to the goods essential to its existence, Cardinal da Castiglione endowed his foundation with a refectory, a garden, a rich library, and a chapel, and also donated vast agricultural properties in the Pavian countryside to the college.

Across many centuries of history, the College went through several difficult periods. For example, during the first phase of the war in the sixteenth century between Charles V and Francis I, which heavily involved Pavia where the famous battle of Pavia also took place, the College had to host Spanish and German students and was even closed for some time. In 1533, however, the College was open and in 1535 it housed sixteen students.

In the second half of the 16th century, Cardinal Francesco Abbondio Castiglioni took care of the college, rearranging its finances and bringing the number of students in 1570 to over twenty. In 1640 the statutes of the college were modified, but the institution began to go through a phase of decline, so much so that in 1770, the plenipotentiary minister of Austrian Lombardy, Karl Joseph von Firmian, decided to merge it with other colleges in Pavia and to reform it. In 1804 the college was joined with the nearby Ghislieri College.

In 1805 it was then sold to the chemist Luigi Valentino Brugnatelli, who transformed it into the home of the Brugnatelli family. In 1928, Luigi Brugnatelli, professor of Mineralogy at the University of Pavia and grandson of Luigi Valentino Brugnatelli, donated the building to the University of Pavia, which after careful restoration, reopened it in 1948 and transformed it into the College Castiglioni Brugnatelli.

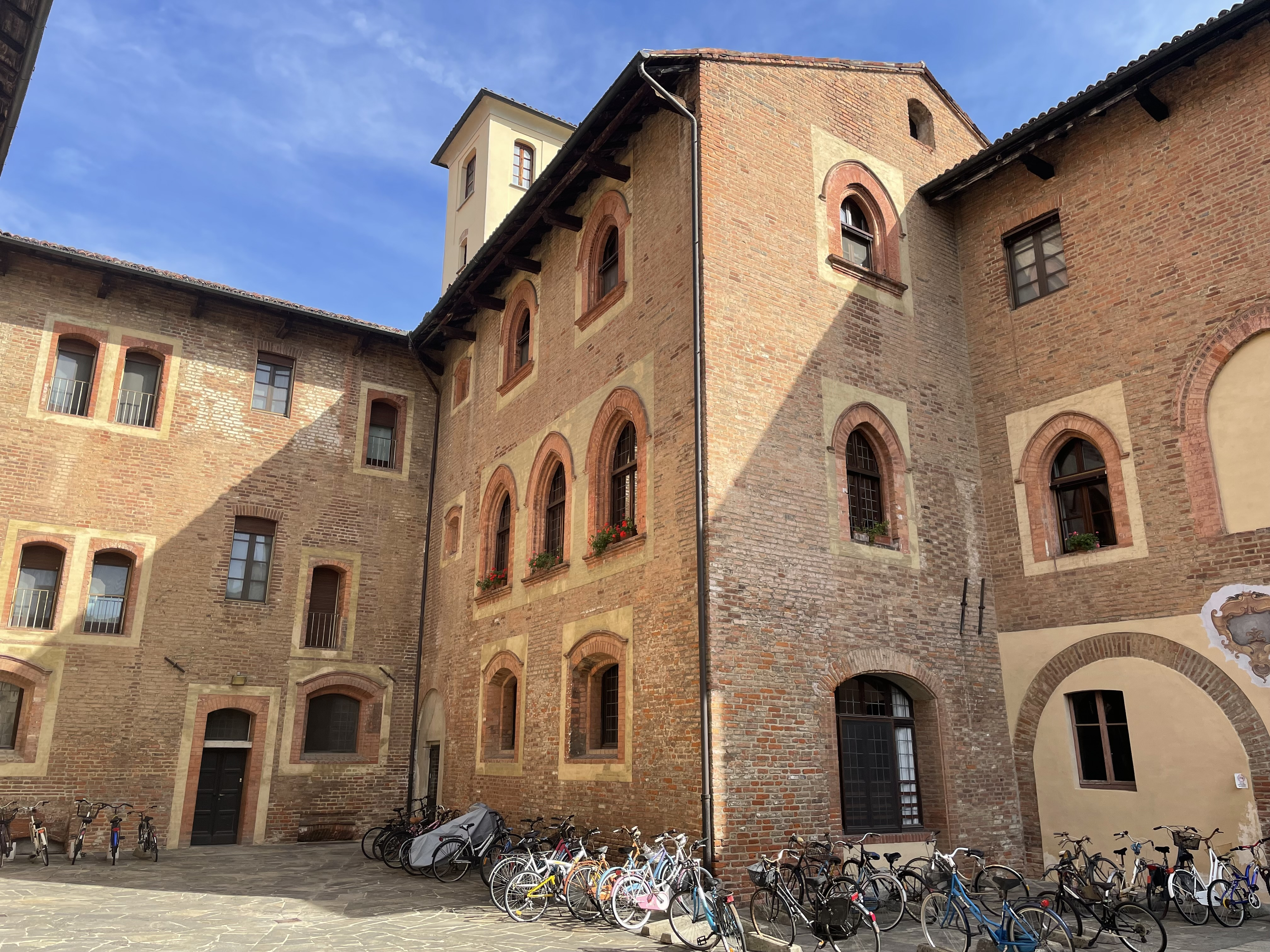
The courtyard of the college.

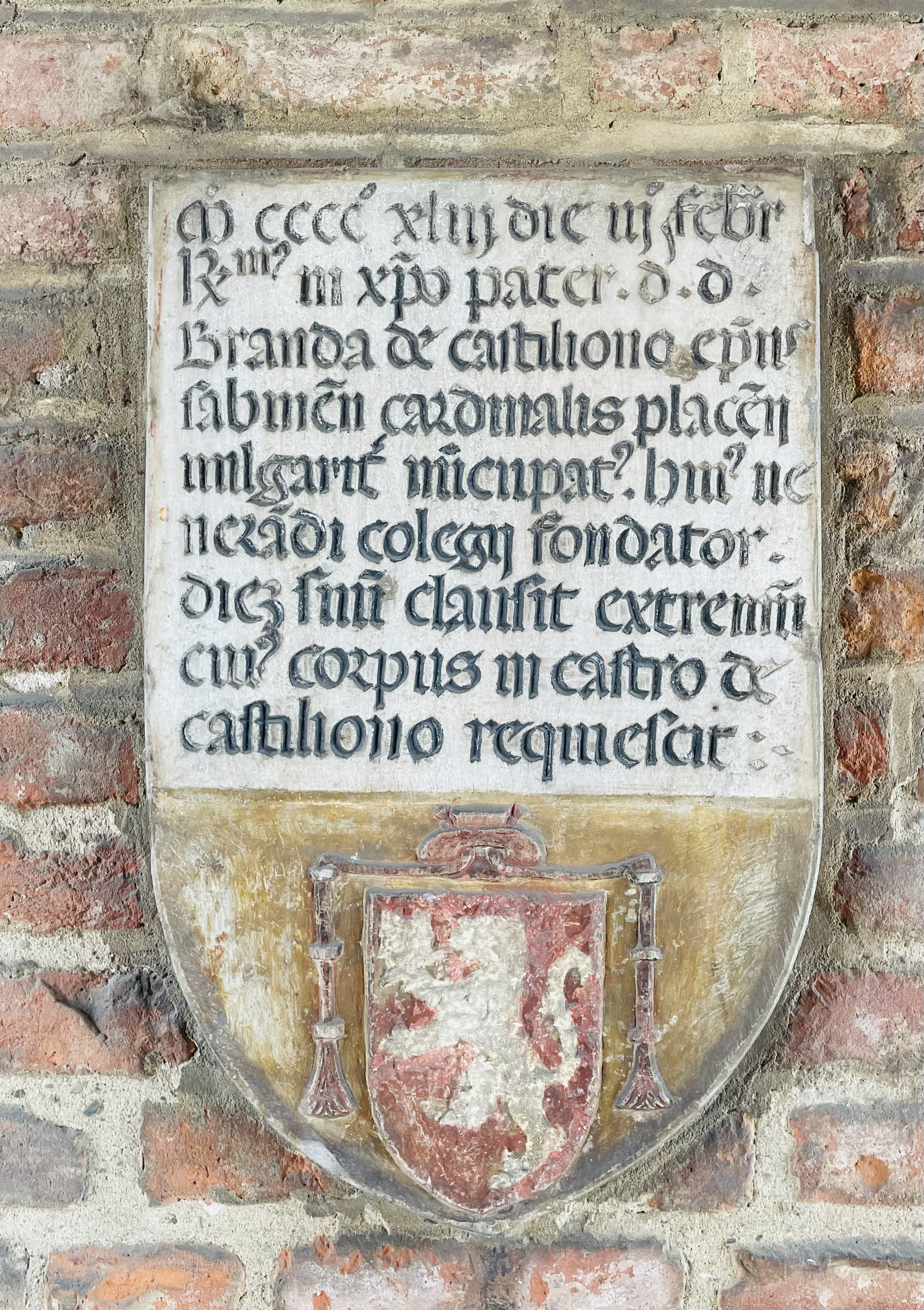
Plaque commemorating the founder, Branda da Castiglione (15th century).

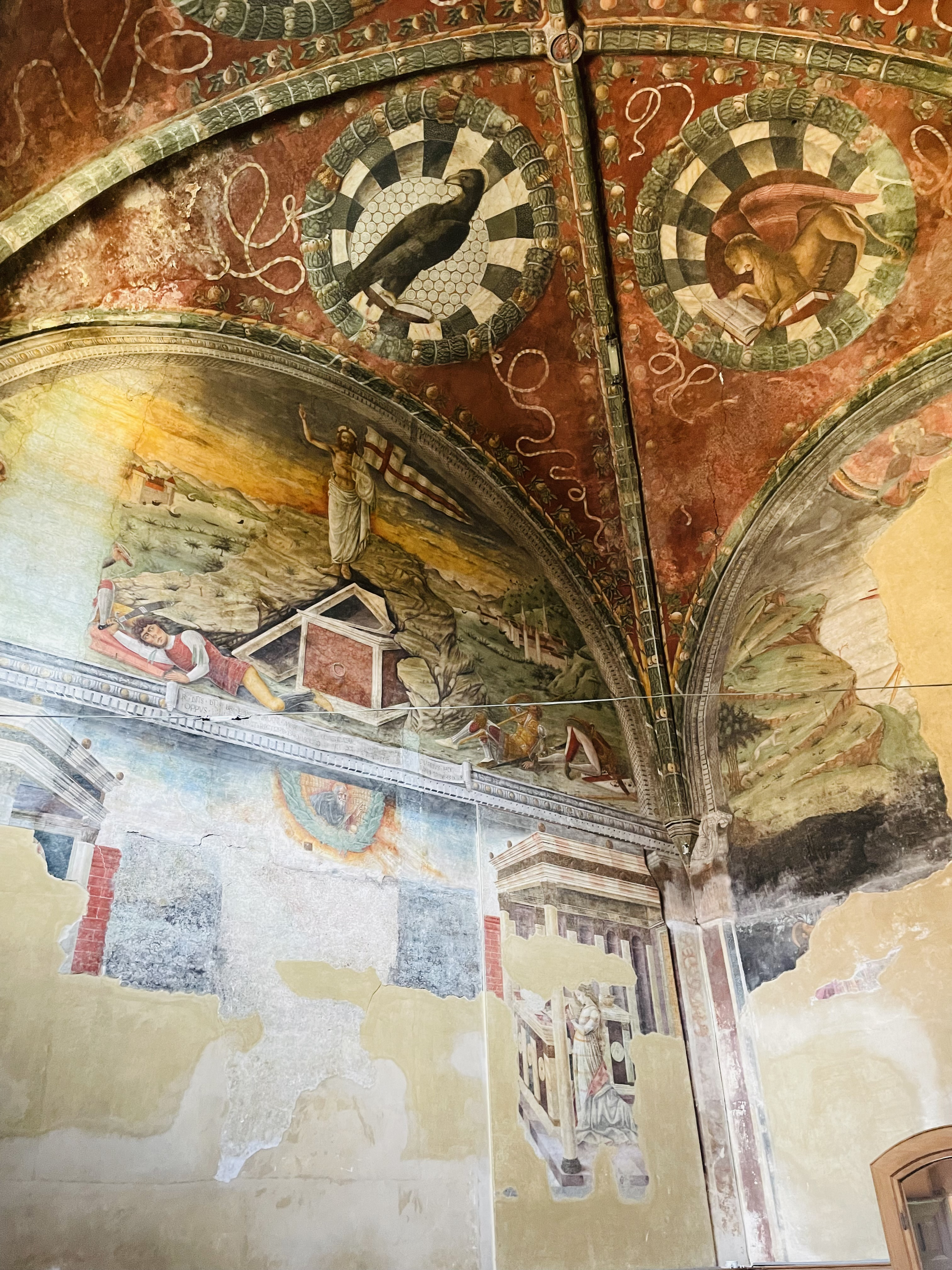
Bonifacio Bembo, frescoes in the chapel, 1475.

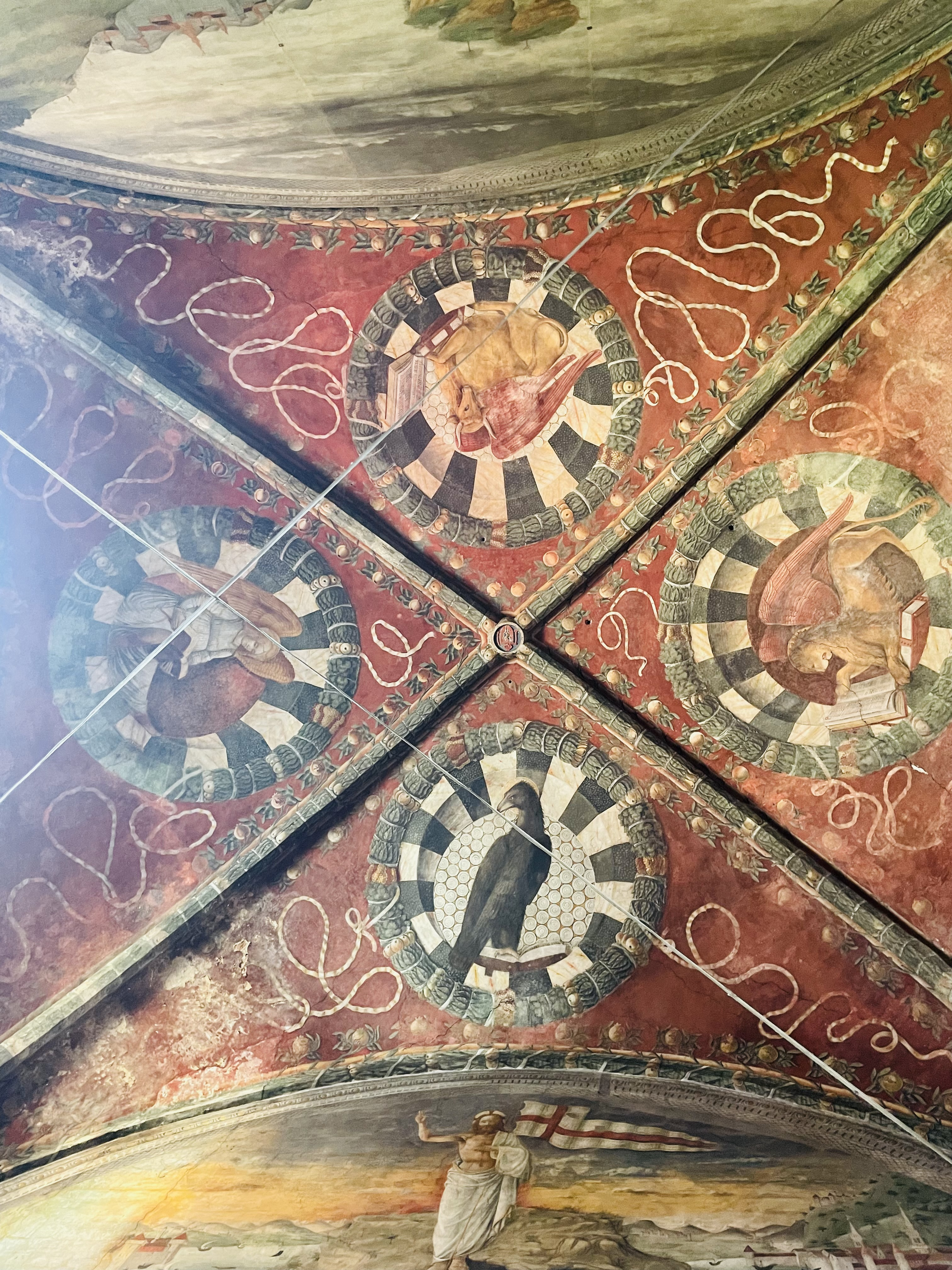
Bonifacio Bembo, frescoes on the vault of the chapel, 1475.

== Architecture ==
The current building is the result of several progressive interventions that altered, in part, the original construction, documenting the long history of the building, its changes of ownership, and its intended uses. The ancient and monumental structure is spread over three floors above ground with staggered levels and has brick masonry left exposed. The building has a U-shaped plan which defines a large rectangular courtyard inside.

Remarkably this building retains the oratory, which has paintings of great interest dating back to 1475, and the work of Bonifacio Bembo, who was housed in the college that year and who also worked at the Visconti Castle in Pavia. The oratory consists of a square room covered by rib vaults inside which, within wreaths of flowers and fruit, there are four medallions with the symbols of the Evangelists, while the creases are flanked by festoons that stand out against the dark red background. The walls hold depictions of the Resurrection (north wall), the Nativity, and the Adoration of the Magi.
