= Vecchietta =

Italian painter (1410–1480)

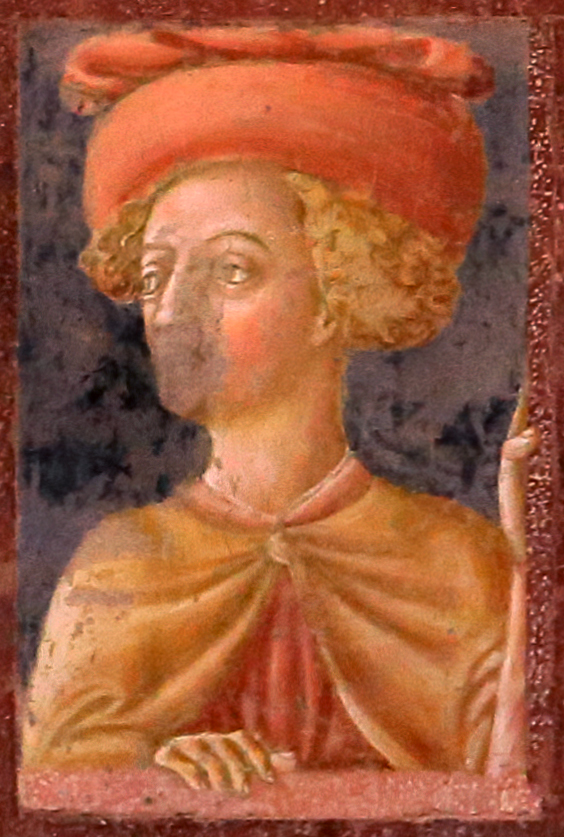
Self-portrait. Detail of a fresco in the Collegiata of Castiglione Olona

Lorenzo di Pietro (1410 – June 6, 1480), known as Vecchietta, was an Italian Sienese School painter, sculptor, goldsmith, and architect of the Renaissance. He is among the artists profiled in Vasari's Le Vite delle più eccellenti pittori, scultori, ed architettori.

It is believed Vecchietta was a pupil of Sassetta, Taddeo di Bartolo, and Jacopo della Quercia. Later in his life he was the master of Francesco di Giorgio and Neroccio de’ Landi.

== "Pittor dello Spedale" ==
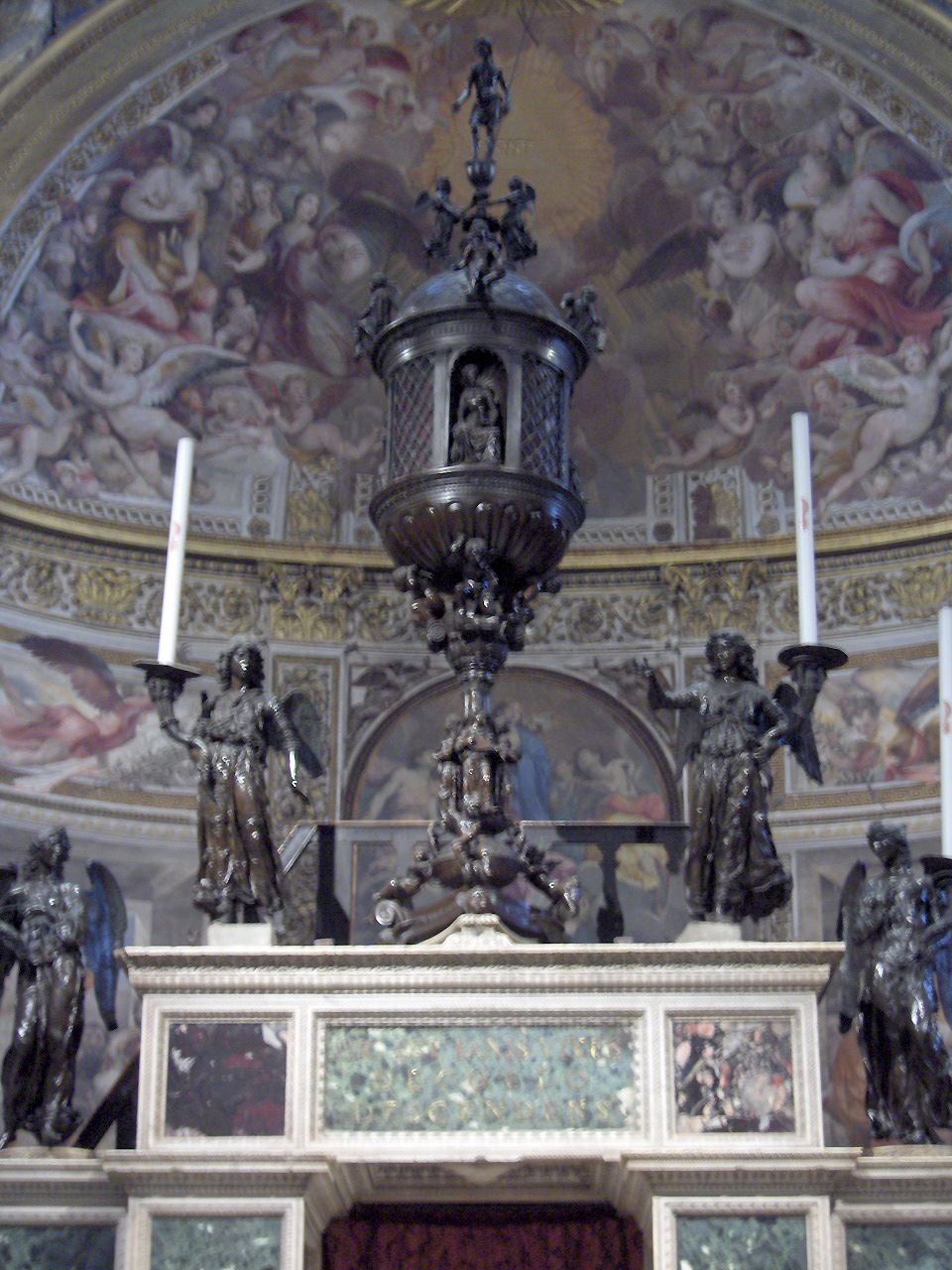
Altar of the Cathedral of Siena with bronze ciborium by Vecchietta.

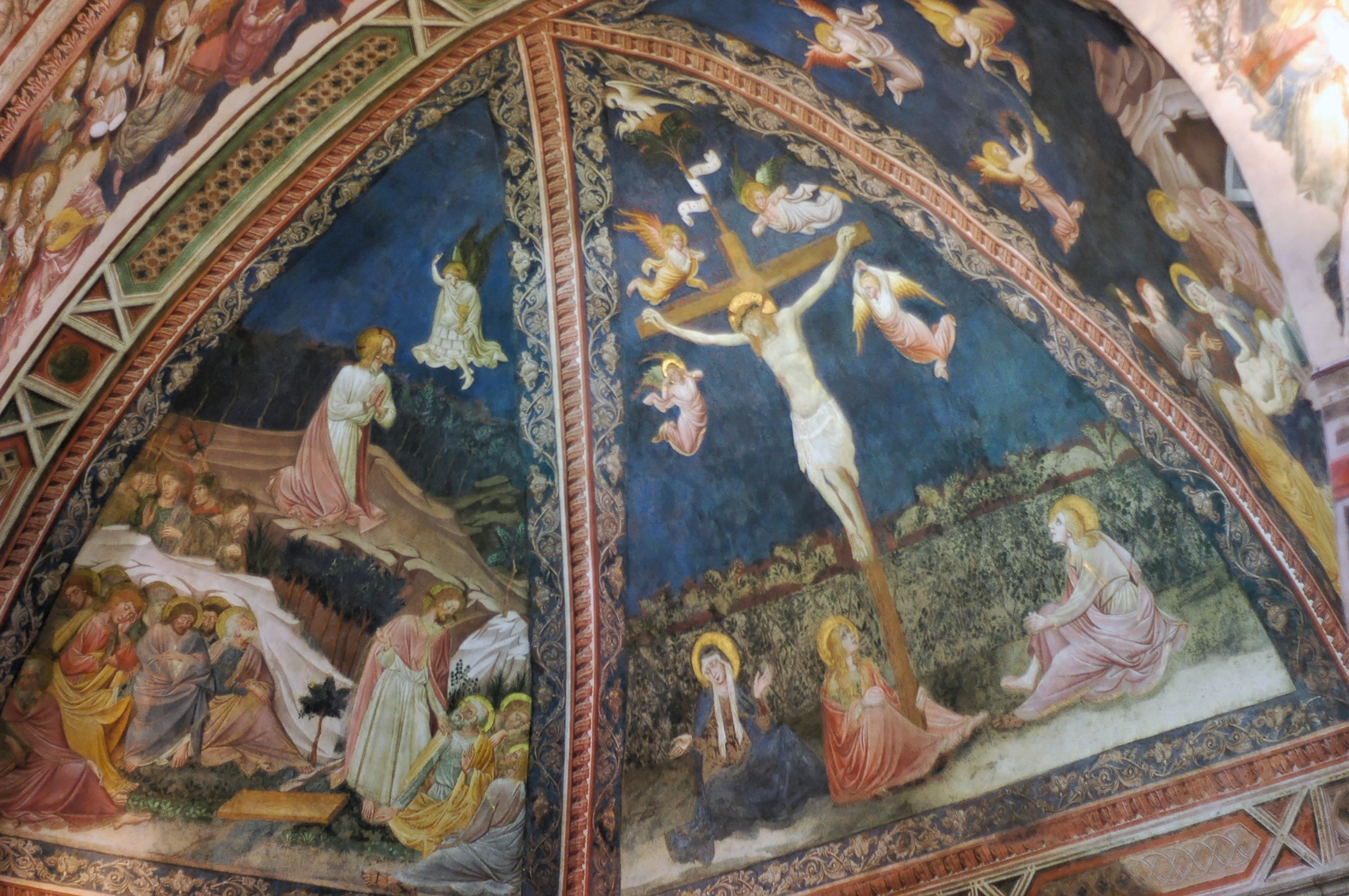
Frescoes of the Baptistry of the Cathedral of Siena, substantially repainted in the 19th century.

Vecchietta was born in Siena. Much of his work may be found there, particularly at the Hospital of Santa Maria della Scala, lending him yet another name: pittor dello spedale (or "painter of the hospital").

For the Pellegrinaio (Pilgrim Hall) at the Hospital complex, Vecchietta painted a series of frescoes, along with Domenico di Bartolo and Priamo della Quercia, including The Founding of the Spedale and The Vision of Santa Sorore, depicting a dream of the mother of the cobbler Sorore, the mythical founder of the Hospital.

Later, around 1444, he created the Cappella del Sacro Chiodo, also known as the Old Sacristy, decorated with his own work. The frescoes included Annunciation, Nativity, and Last Judgment scenes, and an Allegory of the Ladder depicting children climbing to heaven. For the high altar of the Church of the Santissima Annunziata, within the Hospital complex, he created a bronze figure of the Risen Christ (signed and dated 1476), which shows the influence of Donatello.

The Arliquiera, a painted wardrobe for holy relics, was painted by Vecchietta and placed in the Old Sacristy of Santa Maria della Scala in 1445. It is now in the collection of the National Picture Gallery of Siena.

== Other works in Siena ==
An enormous bronze ciborium, created by Vecchietta for the Hospital of Santa Maria della Scala (c. 1467-72), was moved to the Cathedral of Siena in 1506. According to Vasari, "This casting, which is admirable, acquired very great fame and repute for him by reason of the proportion and grace that it shows in all its parts; and whosoever observes this work well can see that the design is good, and that the craftsman was a man of judgment and of practised ability." Between 1447 and 1450, a series of frescoes were completed for the Baptistry of San Giovanni at Siena Cathedral, executed by Vecchietta and his pupils. They include depictions of the Evangelists, Prophets and Sibyls, the Four Articles of the Creed, and the Assumption. The frescoes were substantially repainted at the end of the 19th century. Vecchietta also painted two scenes on the wall of the apse: Flagellation and Road to Calvary.

At the Palazzo Saracini, he created a sculpture of St. Martin. A bronze tomb statue of Marianus Soccinus the Elder (a noted Sienese jurist) for the church of San Domenico is housed at the Uffizi in Florence. For the Loggia della Mercanzia, Vecchietta sculpted life-size figures of St. Peter and St. Paul (c.1458-1460), which Vasari praised as "wrought with consummate grace and executed with fine mastery." Vecchietta also crafted a silver statue of St. Catherine of Siena at the time of the saint's canonization in 1461. This work disappeared after the siege of Siena in 1555.

== Works elsewhere ==
Outside Siena, Vecchietta's chief work is a painting of the Assumption (1451) at the church in Pienza, created for the Piccolomini Pope Pius II. The Uffizi in Florence, in addition to the bronze statue of Marianus brought from Siena, has a panel depicting the Madonna created by Vecchietta.

Vecchietta died in Siena on 6 June 1480.
