= Desco da parto (Masaccio) =

Painting by Masaccio

Nativity
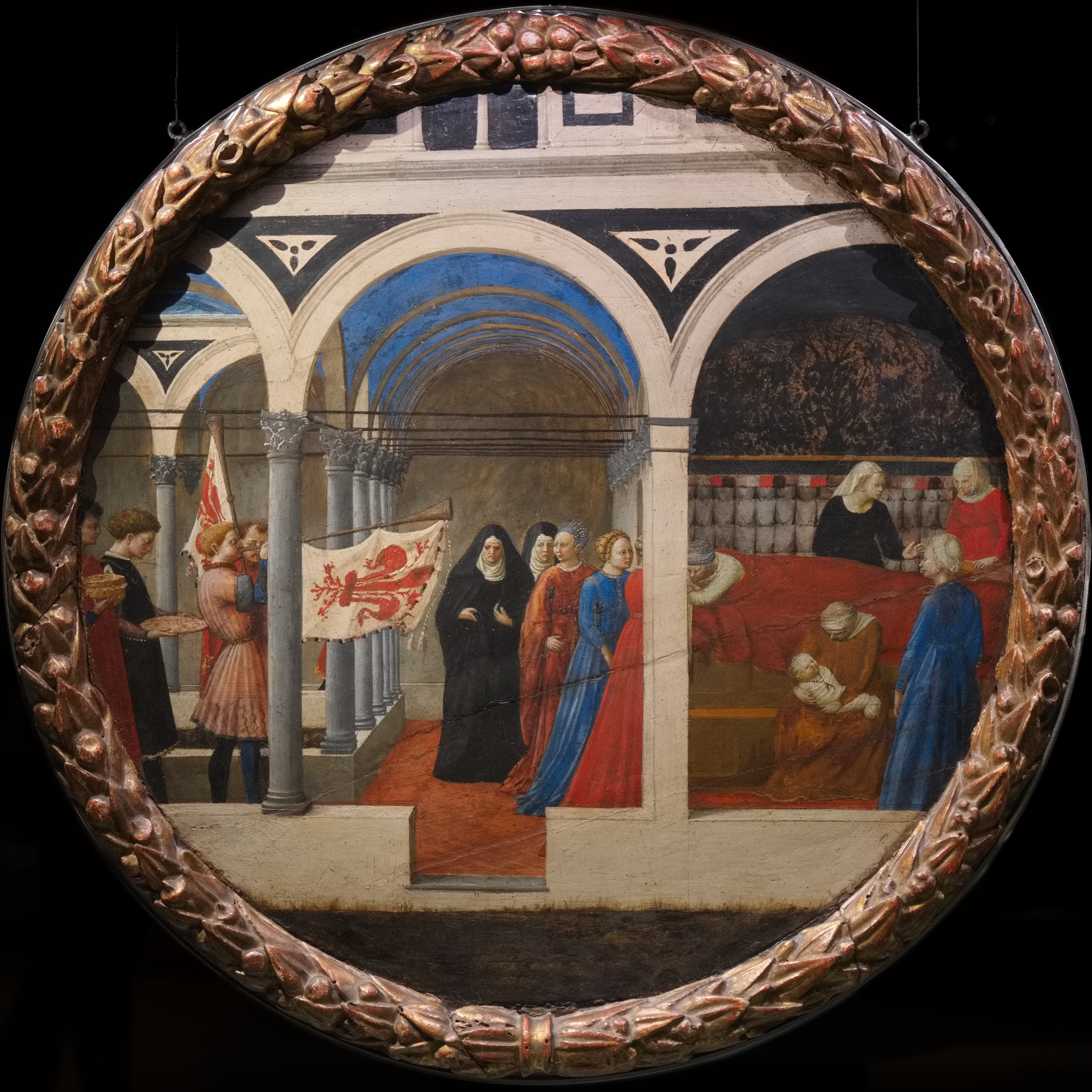
- Artist: Masaccio
- Year: c. 1427–1428
- Medium: Tempera on wood
- Dimensions: 56 cm diameter (22 in)
- Location: Gemäldegalerie, Berlin

This painting, also commonly known as The Berlin Tondo, is a desco da parto, or birth tray, painted by the Italian Renaissance artist Masaccio. Stylistic analysis shows similarities with his San Giovenale Triptych, an early work of the painter from 1422, and the birth tray is dated a short time after it at around 1423. With the frame around it, the tondo has a diameter of 66 cm.

== Top side ==
The upper side of the tray shows a scene soon (probably a few days) after the actual birth of a child. It takes place on the ground floor of a well-to-do contemporary house, a palace with white and black stone facings in a very modern style for Tuscan architecture. There is an arcade of round arches on Corinthian columns leading to a garden, with a courtyard at left, where the banners attached to the trumpets giving a fanfare inform us that the event takes place in Florence: a red lily on white ground. A cutaway view, removing the bedroom wall nearest the viewer, is used; Giotto and others had used this compositional device.

Three ladies and two widows or nuns in the arcade are just arriving, while two men on the far left stand holding gifts, one is holding a birth tray. The two hired trumpeters will announce the ceremonial presentation of these gifts, presumably after the female visitors are all assembled.

Visits by female friends and relations to the mother in the prolonged "lying-in" period after a birth were an important social occasion. The mother lies in her bed, perhaps still exhausted, or greeting the half-visible woman entering the room. Inside the bedroom are four women who care for her and the child, who is wrapped in white cloth swaddling with a piece of coral hung around its neck as a dummy, and for later use in teething.

Many birthing trays had scenes of the visits to the new mother, but these, though using contemporary costume and an elevated social setting, were often lightly disguised as the Birth of the Virgin or that of John the Baptist, the patron saint of Florence. This tray is unusual in apparently making no attempt to suggest a setting in Biblical times.

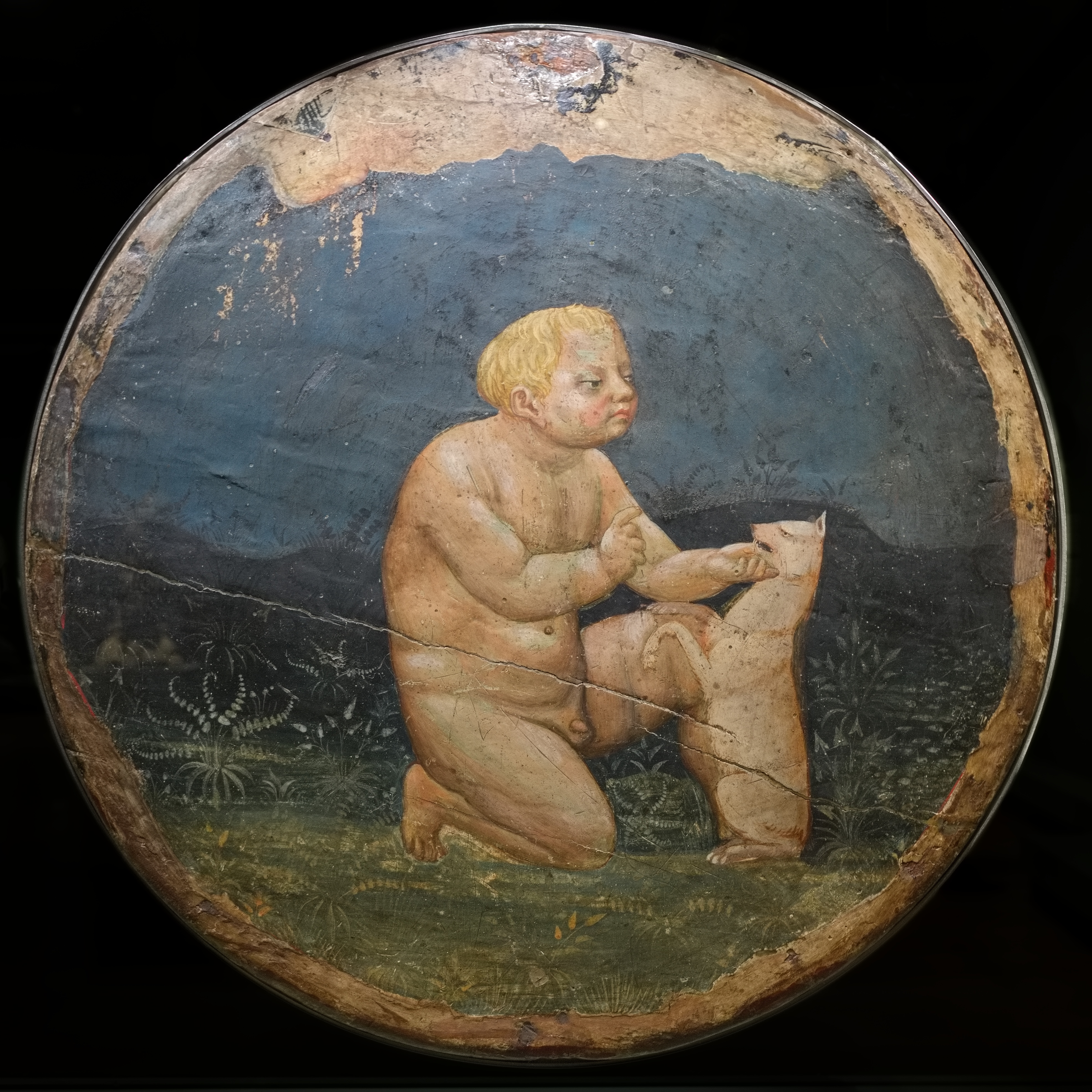
Masaccio, desco da parto, back, c. 1423, Gemäldegalerie, Berlin

== Reverse ==
On the reverse side of the tray is a painting of a naked baby boy, a common feature of birthing trays, probably exposed during the pregnancy to encourage the birth of a healthy boy. He is in a meadow playing with a cat (possibly a dog).

It has similarities with the Christ child in the Juvenal triptych. Usually the reverse face is of a simpler design than the upper side and shows the family coat of arms; here there was one, or the two parental ones, at the top but the paint has largely gone in that area.

The art historian Luciano Bellosi saw the back, with a less accomplished style, as painted by Massaccio's younger brother Giovanni di ser Giovanni Guidi (called "Lo Scheggia"), whose workshop specialized in birthing trays. But the nature of a reverse may account for the discrepancy.

== See also ==
- List of major paintings by Masaccio
