= Desco da parto =

Italian painted object

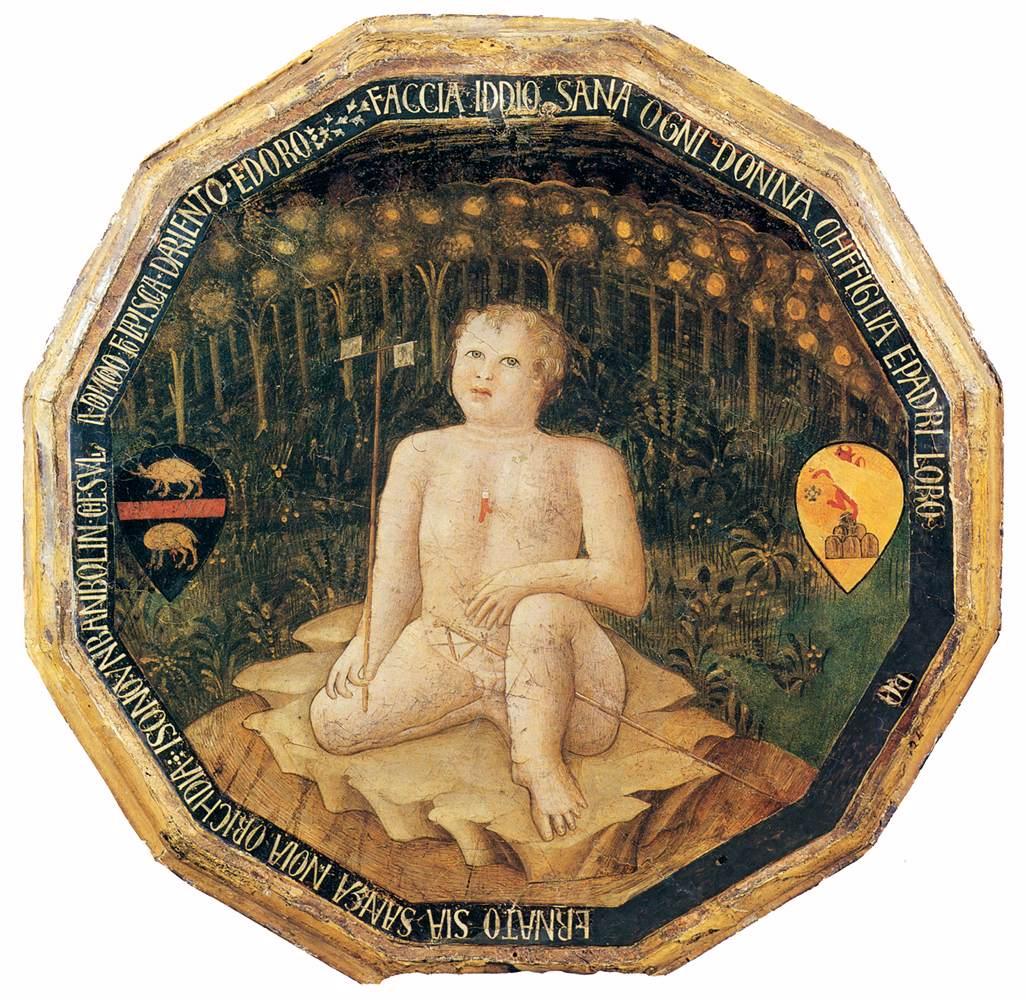
Bartolomeo di Fruosino, 1420, a typical verso with heraldry and a baby boy, who is urinating

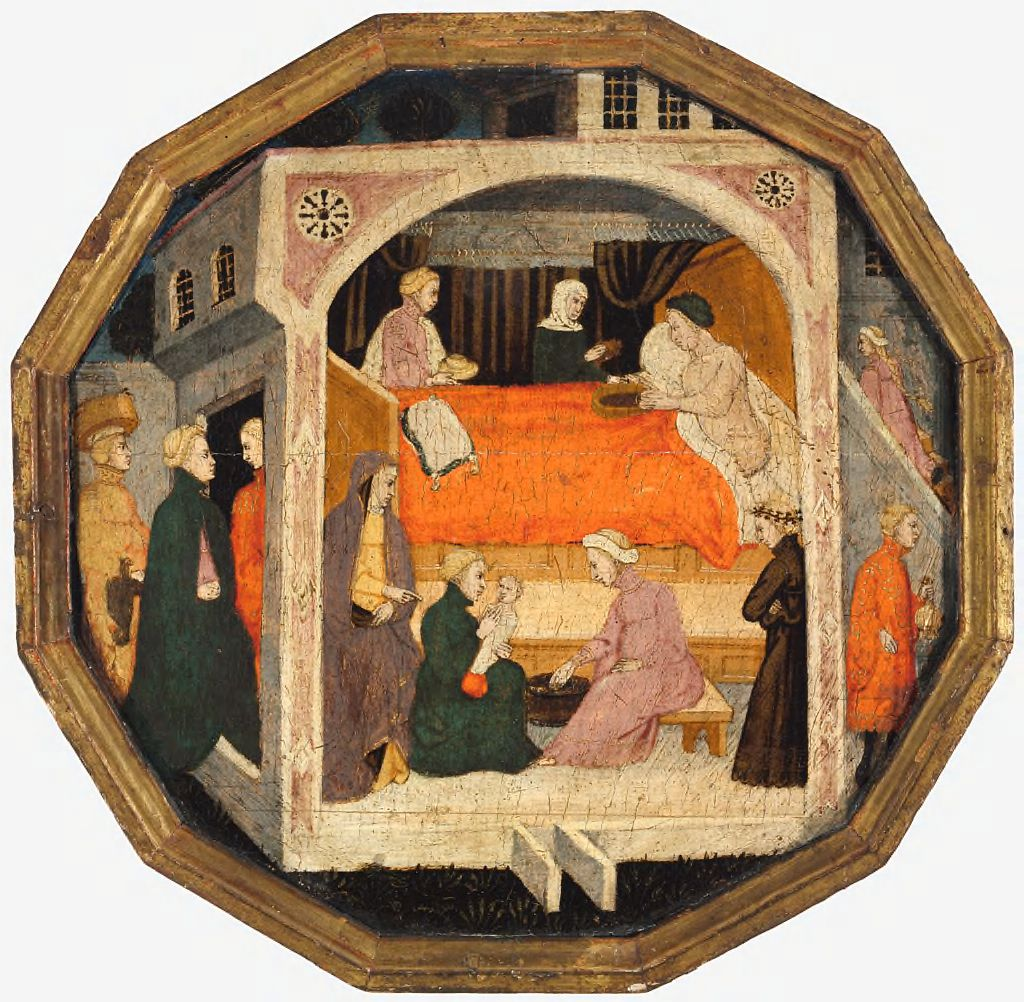
Birthing scene, apparently not Biblical. As women tend to the child, expensively dressed female guests are already arriving.

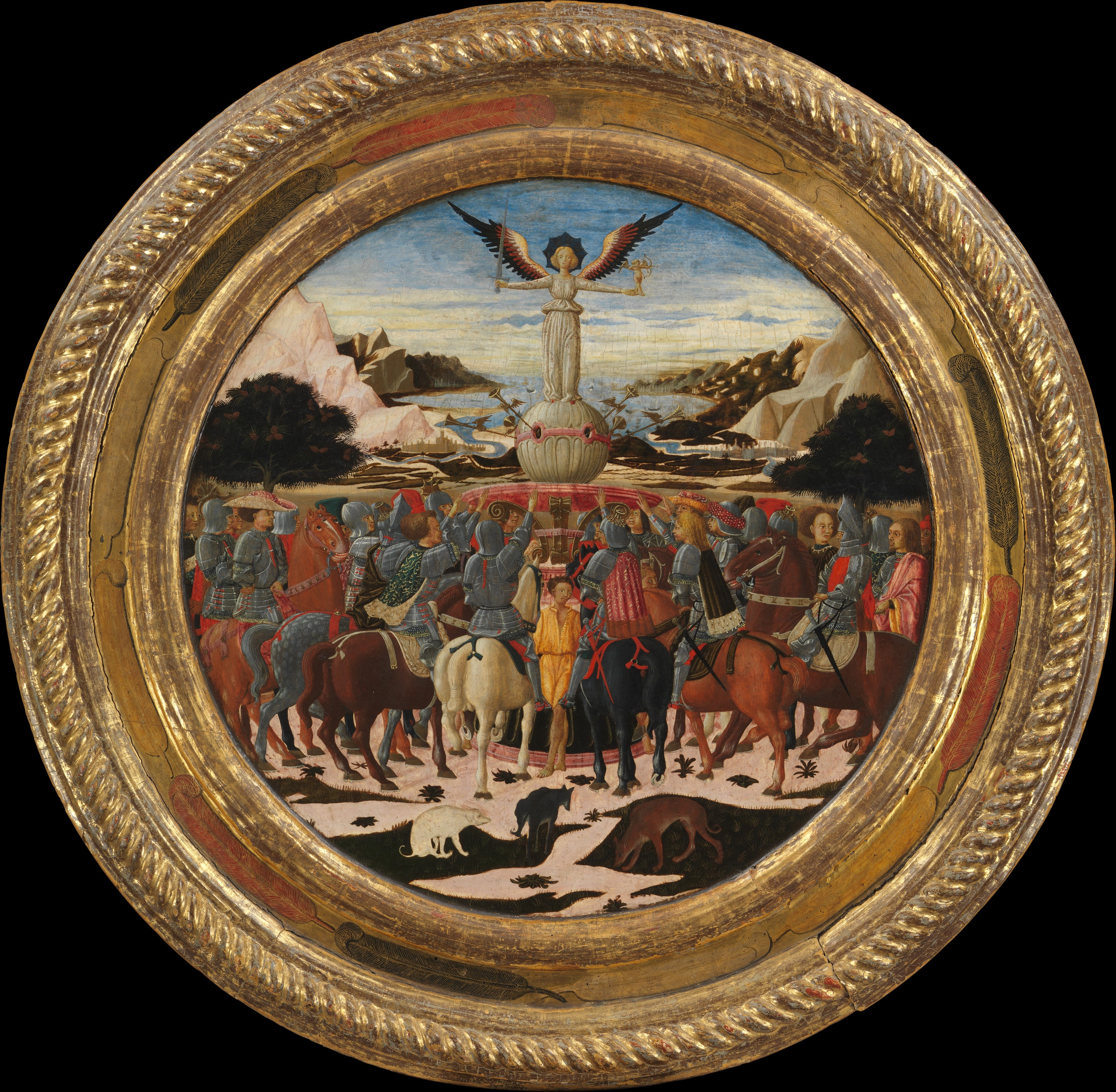
Triumph of Fame on the Medici–Tornabuoni desco da parto painted for the birth of Lorenzo de' Medici, 1449

A painted desco da parto (a birth tray or birth salver; pl.: deschi da parto) was an important symbolic gift on the occasion of a successful birth in late medieval and Early Modern Florence and Siena. The surviving painted deschi represented in museum collections were commissioned by elite families, but inventories show that birth trays and other special birth objects like embroidered pillows were kept long after the successful birth in families of all classes: when Lorenzo de' Medici died, the inventory shows that the desco da parto given by his father to his mother, Lucrezia Tornabuoni, at her lying-in, was hanging in his private quarters to the day of his death.

A desco da parto need not have been specially commissioned; they were produced in workshops in series for stock, often being personalised with a coat-of-arms when they were bought. There was a distinctive repertoire of iconography for the trays, the recto (top) sides sharing much with that for the painted cassone chests often used as gifts at marriage, but also with verso (bottom) sides often showing scenes of mothers after childbirth or pin-up figures of boy toddlers, accompanied by the coats of arms of both parents. After being used as a tray during the period of postpartum confinement, they could be hung on a wall as a painting.

== Usage ==
Infant mortality was highest during the crucial first days, when the mother might also succumb to childbed fever. A successful childbirth was lavishly celebrated. Sons would one day assert the family interests, whether in modest workshop or banking house; daughters would share the household's work until they were married and would cement the exogamous ties that stabilized Tuscan family position at every social level. Painted childbirth trays began to appear about 1370, in the generation following the Black Death, when the tenuousness of life was more vivid than ever. In the fifteenth century, D.C. Ahl found, at least one appears in almost half of all inventories she surveyed.

The mother was expected to remain "lying in", enjoying bed rest during a postpartum period of variable duration, but probably lasting at least a week. No fixed term of lying-in is recommended in Renaissance manuals on family life (unlike in some other cultures, see Postpartum confinement), but it appears from documentary records that the mother was rarely present at the baptism, in Italian cities usually held within a week of the birth at the local parish church, normally a few minutes' walk from any house. During this period the mother and child were visited in the bedroom by family and female friends, and presented with gifts. The tray or salver, often covered with a protective cloth, was used for serving delicacies to the visitors, perhaps including some they had brought as presents: a maid brings a cloth-covered desco with two carafes of water and wine to fortify Saint Anne in Paolo Uccello's fresco of the Birth of the Virgin (1436), in the Chapel of the Annunciation in Prato Cathedral.

Raiment might be ceremoniously brought into the specially-decorated bedchamber where the new mother lay: in a desco da parto by Masaccio of 1427, the tray and a covered cup are preceded by a pair of trumpeters flying banners with the Florentine gigli. In fact, in patrician households the bed was often placed in a reception room for the occasion (if there was not one already in such a room, after the fashion of the French and Burgundian courts), and the mother lay there while receiving visits from her friends over several days.

== Iconography ==
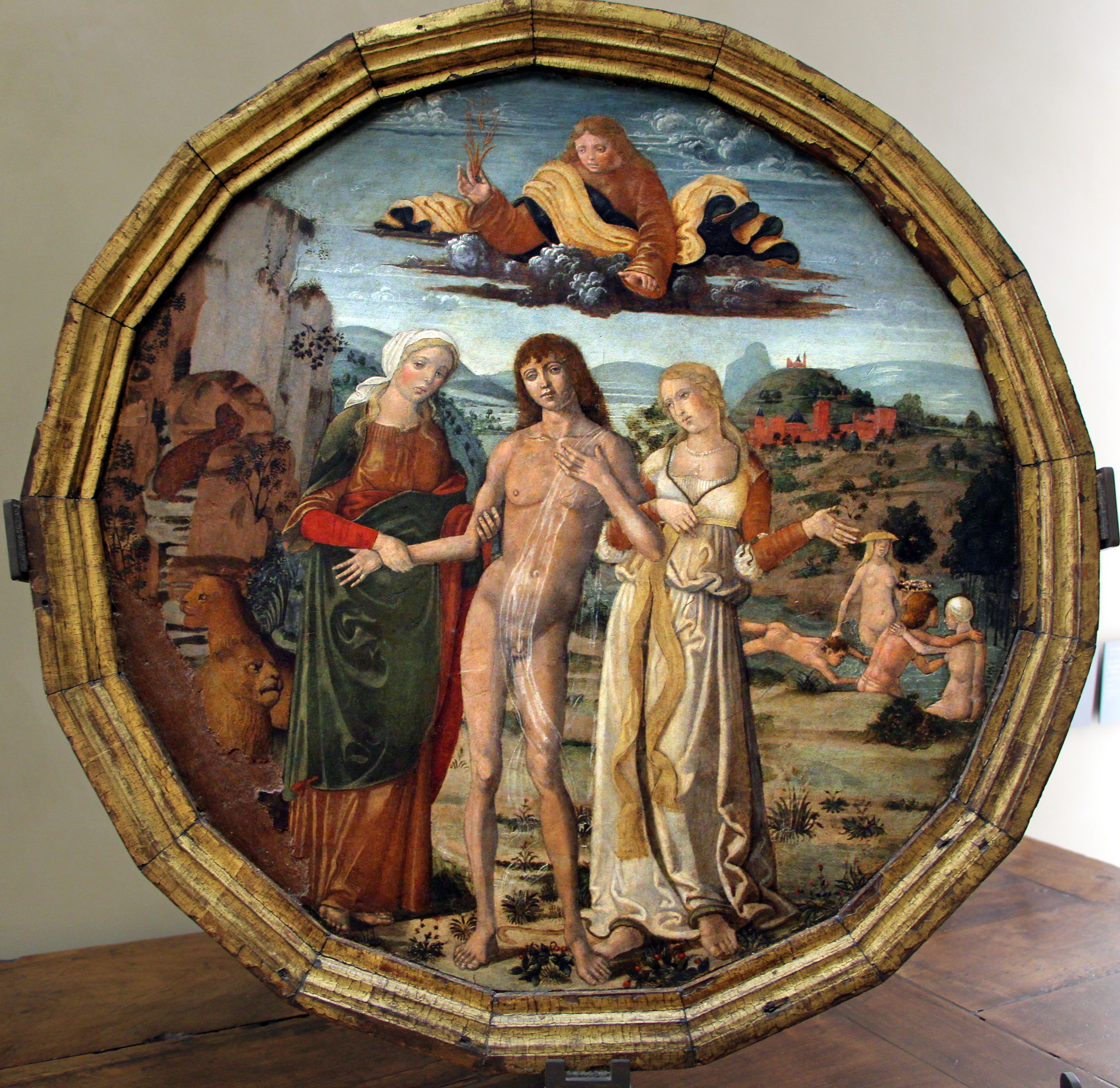
A less common example from Siena, with the Choice of Hercules by Girolamo di Benvenuto, around 1500

For the painted trays made for the elite on these joyous occasions, in general, both sides of the tray are painted, the upper side (or recto) generally with a crowded figure scene, usually secular, such as a scene from classical myth or a suitable allegory. Scenes from the Old Testament or the Christian religious repertoire also appear in some cases. Birthing scenes were popular. These might be the Birth of the Virgin or that of Florence's patron saint, John the Baptist, but only a halo or two distinguishes these from other scenes apparently showing a birth scene as a genre painting. A tray in the New York Historical Society shows a genre birthing scene but is closely copied from a drawing of the birth of John the Baptist by Lorenzo Monaco.

In all these the mother sits up in bed receiving gifts from a stream of female visitors, while at the front of the scene the child is washed or wrapped in swaddling by more women. In one male pageboys serve the guests. Another tray shows boys and men playing a local fighting game in the street (see gallery). The earliest painted illustration of a novella of Boccaccio is on a Florentine desco da parto with the arms of a Pisan family, made c. 1410 and in the Metropolitan Museum of Art. The survivals include three allegorical scenes of the Triumph of Love, derived from Petrarch's Triumphs, and one Triumph of Venus.

The underside or verso generally has a simpler and often less elevated subject, with fewer, larger figures, and usually includes heraldry, with the arms of both parents shown. Scenes with one or two naked boy toddlers, with the coats of arms of both parents at the sides, are especially popular. The arms of the mother's family traditionally take the right hand side, but in some examples the arms have been changed by overpainting them. Inscriptions in the field or round the rim sometimes provide the date of the fortunate event, providing art historians with a useful fixed point. Like some other types of art, such as the "Otto prints", desci were mostly expected to be decorated in what was considered to be feminine taste, although how the design was selected is unclear. In an example painted by Masaccio's brother two boys wrestle, with certainly one and probably both using the hold of pulling on the other's penis with one hand and hair with the other (see gallery).

In the Renaissance it was believed that the sights a pregnant woman saw affected her pregnancy and even what it produced – Martin Luther told the cautionary story of a woman frightened by a mouse in pregnancy, who then gave birth to a mouse. Manuals advised keeping images with a positive impact in the sight of pregnant women, and it is in this context that the recurrent naked boys, and the scenes showing the end of a successful childbirth, should be seen. This was also a factor in the display of images of the Virgin and Child, which were ubiquitous in bedrooms. Probably the desci were hung with the verso displayed during pregnancy, to promote the production of a similar healthy boy.

Two pairs of images

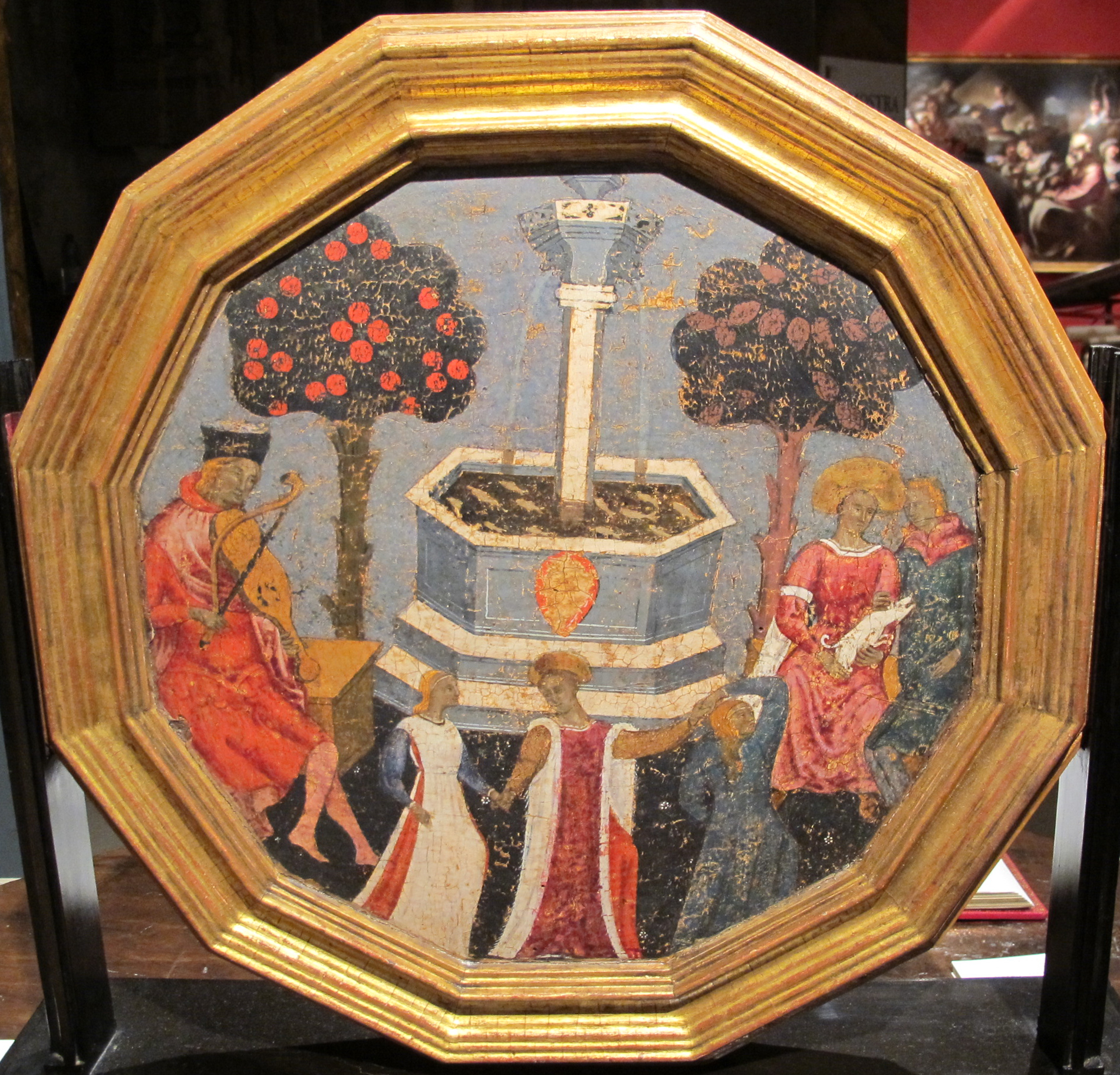
Garden of Love, recto c. 1420, 5 cm (2.0 in) diameter

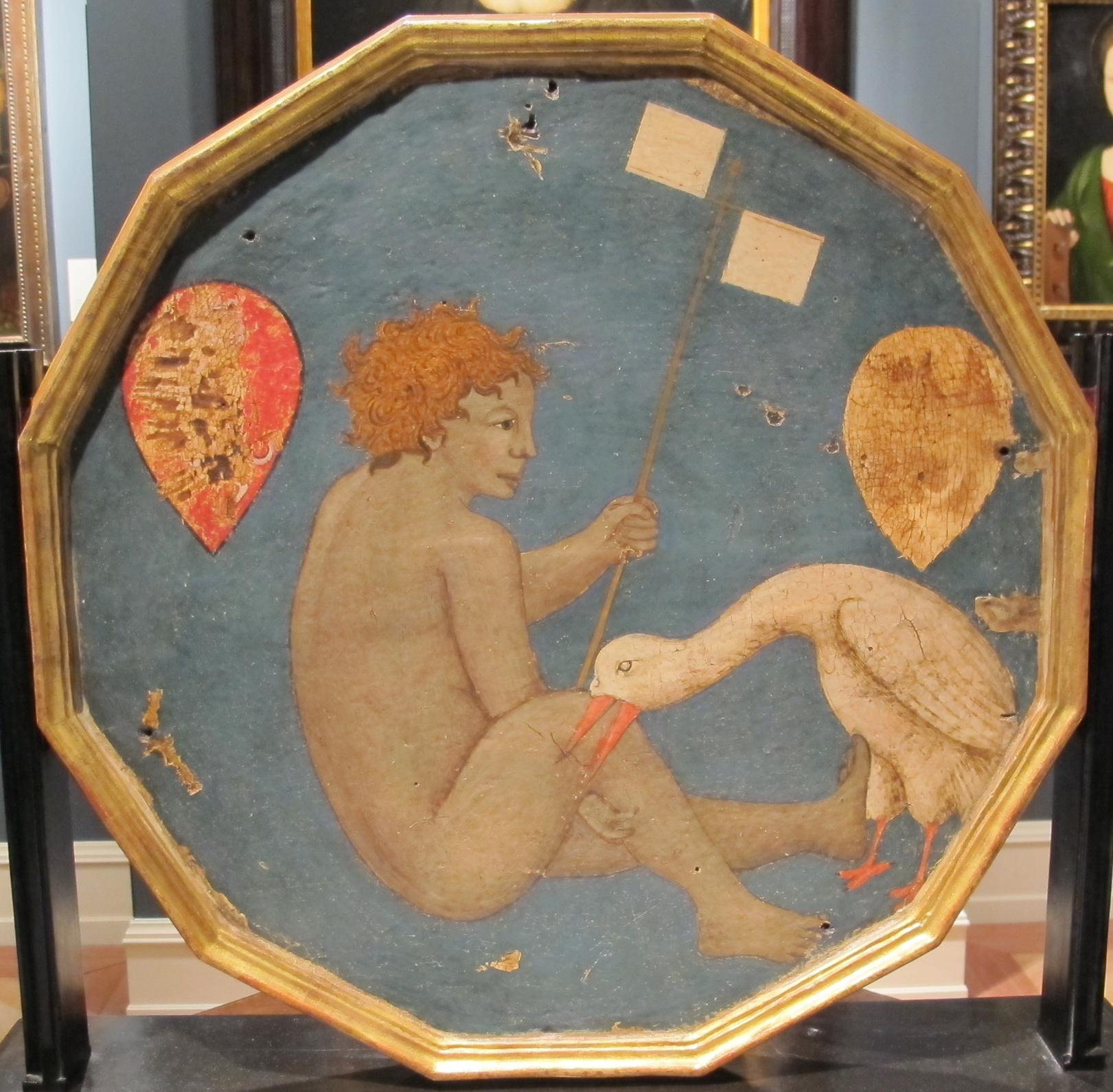
Verso of the last, with 2 coats of arms and a boy with a stork(?)

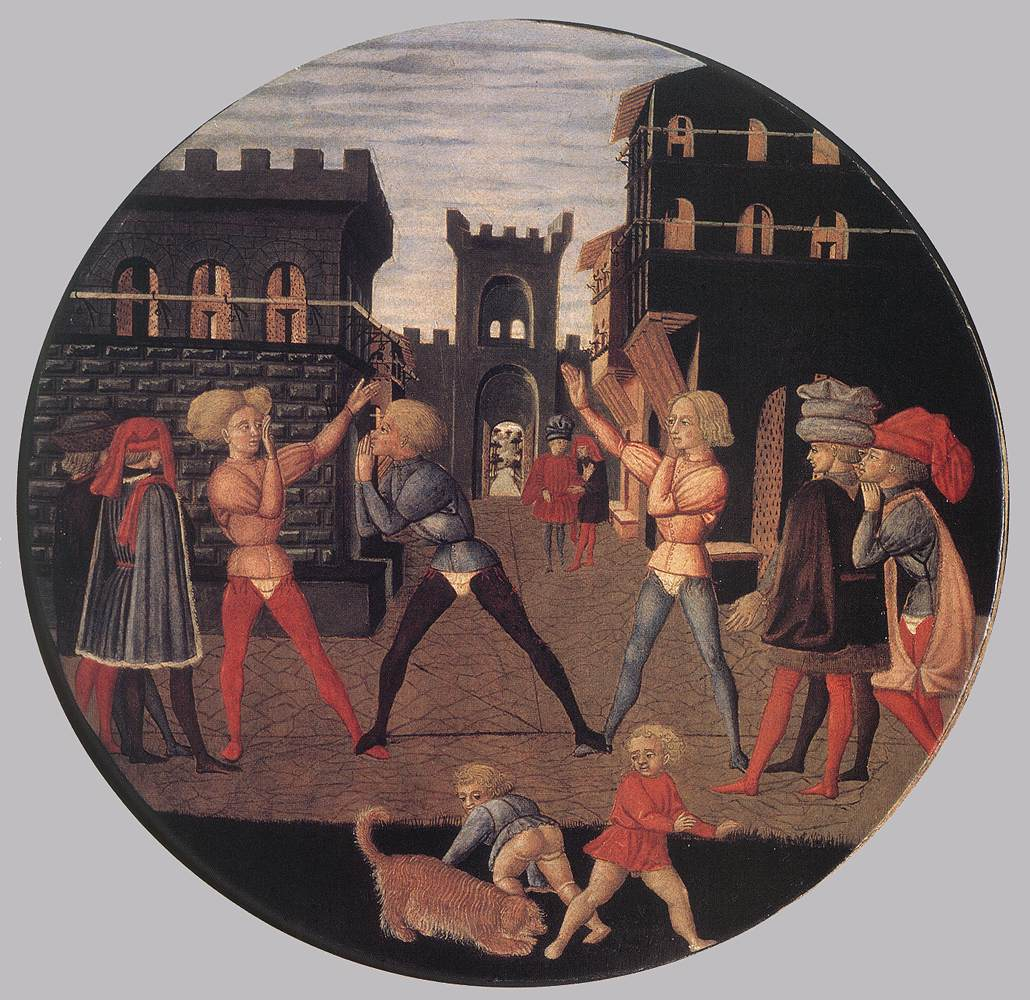
A game of Civettino, recto c. 1450, by Masaccio's brother

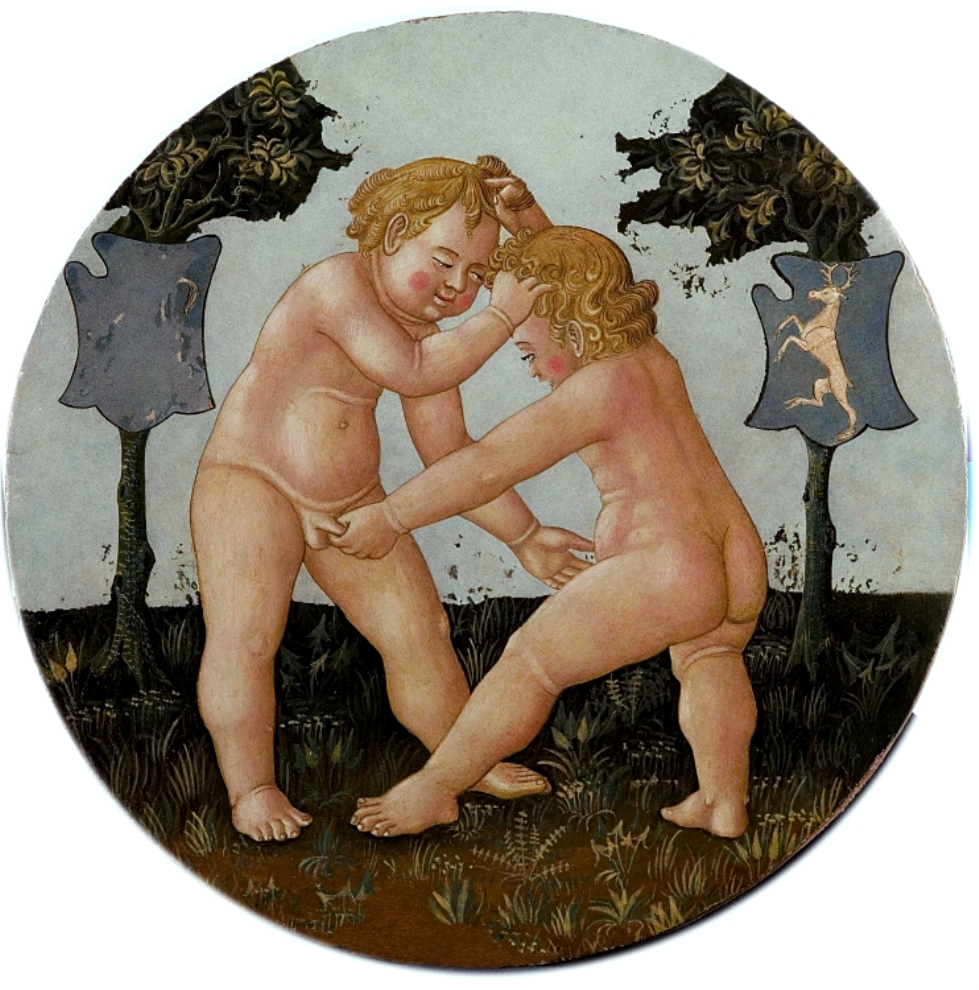
Verso, as last. Two boys engage in no holds barred wrestling.

== Artists and history ==
Workshops that produced deschi da parto were often also manuscript illuminators, as for example Bartolomeo di Fruosino, an illuminator who also produced panel paintings, and painters of the panels that were incorporated into the fronts and ends of quattrocento cassoni. Such a workshop was that of the "Master of the Adimari cassone", now usually identified as Masaccio's brother Giovanni di ser Giovanni Guidi (or "Lo Scheggia", "the Splinter"), which also produced the desco da parto showing youths playing at civettino in an urban setting, in Palazzo Davanzati, Florence, and other examples. A divided verso showing two naked boys fighting realized $482,500 at auction in 2012.

Some artists remain unidentified, and were clearly not of the first rank, but, given the significant names represented among the tiny proportion of survivors, it appears that many artists took an occasional break from larger projects to produce desci. The circular tondo shape in normal panel paintings, which became fashionable in the mid-fifteenth century in Florence, may have developed from the smaller desci.

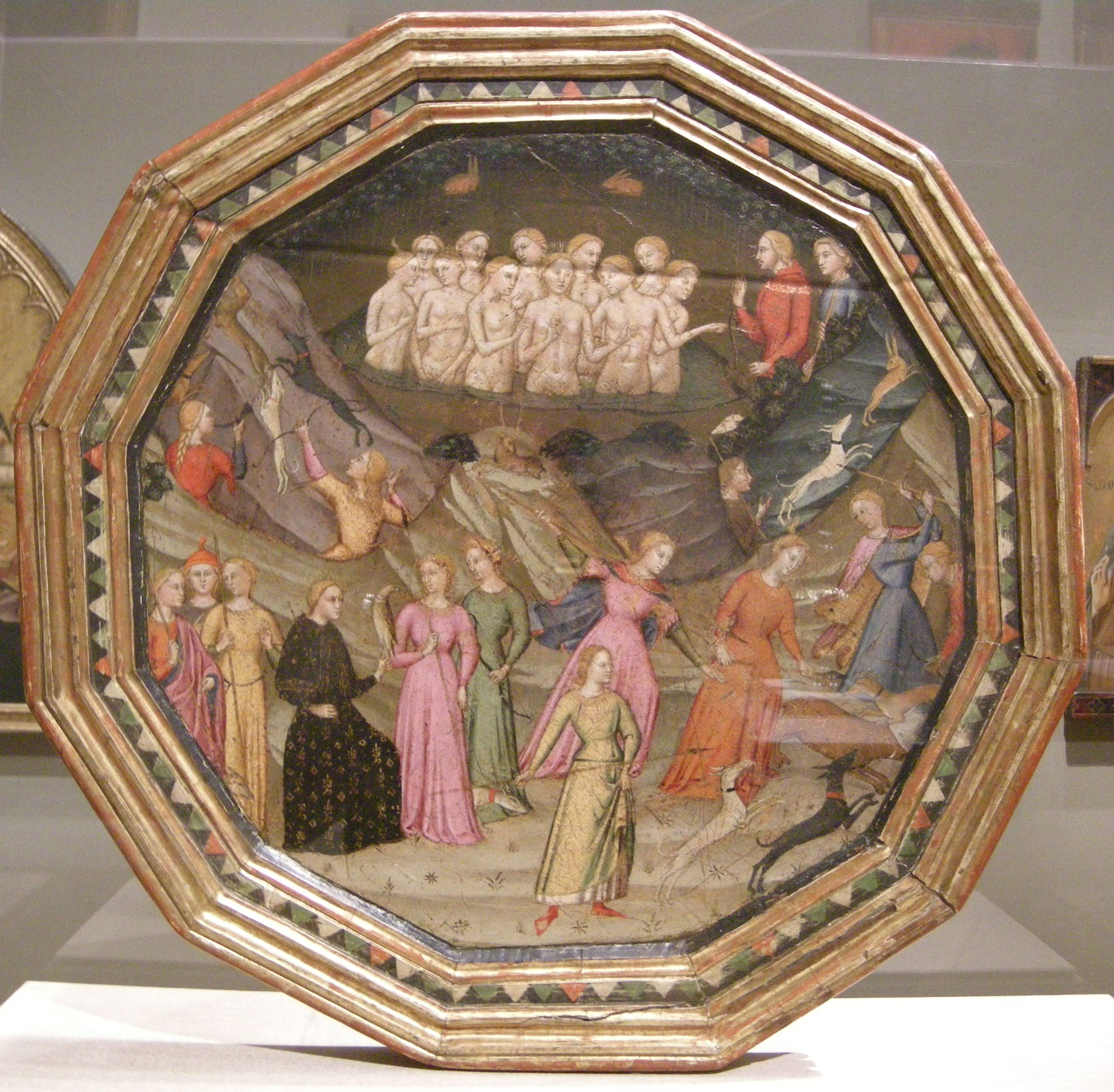
The story of Diana and Actaeon, San Francisco Legion of Honor Museum

The format of the desco, usually about 50 to 60 cm across, is with twelve or sixteen sides, or from about 1430, round, enclosed within a slightly raised lip integral to the panel. Some examples that are now round seem to have originally been twelve-sided. Some have dates that record the day of the birth (or marriage) concerned. Only about two dozen desci survive, some now with the surfaces sawn apart by dealers in modern times, to create two works. In inventories they are often described as "broken" or "old", and most apparently were used as trays until too scruffy to keep. As the 15th century continued they were gradually replaced as gifts by pieces of majolica, often special "birthing sets" with similar iconography, although the Uffizi has an example of 1524 by Jacopo Pontormo, and others are even later. Examples from the 16th-century tend to have a more raised bowl-like profile, as in the Pontormo, as if echoing the new maiolica shapes. Production of painted cassoni ceased over the same decades.

Jacqueline Marie Musacchio rejects the common assumption that these trays were made to celebrate a marriage; she never encountered a desco da nozze in any 15th-century inventory. But a Sienese wedding casket (cofanetto nuziale) in wood in the Louvre has a round top with a Triumph of Venus by Giovanni di Paolo (dated 1421) that is effectively identical to the desci form. Nevertheless, if they were presented at the time of the marriage, though certainly regarded as associated specifically with pregnancy and childbirth, this would both explain how such elaborate objects were available for use very soon after an uncertain event, and mean that the beneficial images of boys could exert their positive influence throughout the important first pregnancy.

== Female taste ==
Other types of secular Italian Renaissance art designed for female tastes are the marriage caskets made by the Embriachi workshop and others, and the Otto prints for lids and covers of boxes.

== Example in San Francisco ==
The San Francisco Legion of Honor Museum has an example painted about 1400 by Lorenzo di Niccolo, a Florentine painter who was active from 1391 to 1412. The recto shows the story of Diana and Actaeon. Diana, goddess of hunting appears in the foreground clothed in a dark, brocaded robe and carrying a falcon; at the right, her nymphs pursue a boar. At the top of the painting, Diana and her nymphs are bathing in a pool of water when the mortal Actaeon happens upon the naked goddess. For offending the virgin deity, Actaeon was transformed into a stag to be hunted down by his own dogs. His fate is illustrated on the left side, where hounds chase a deer. The reverse (verso) shows the allegorical figure of Justice with two family coats of arms while holding a scale and a sword.

== Gallery ==
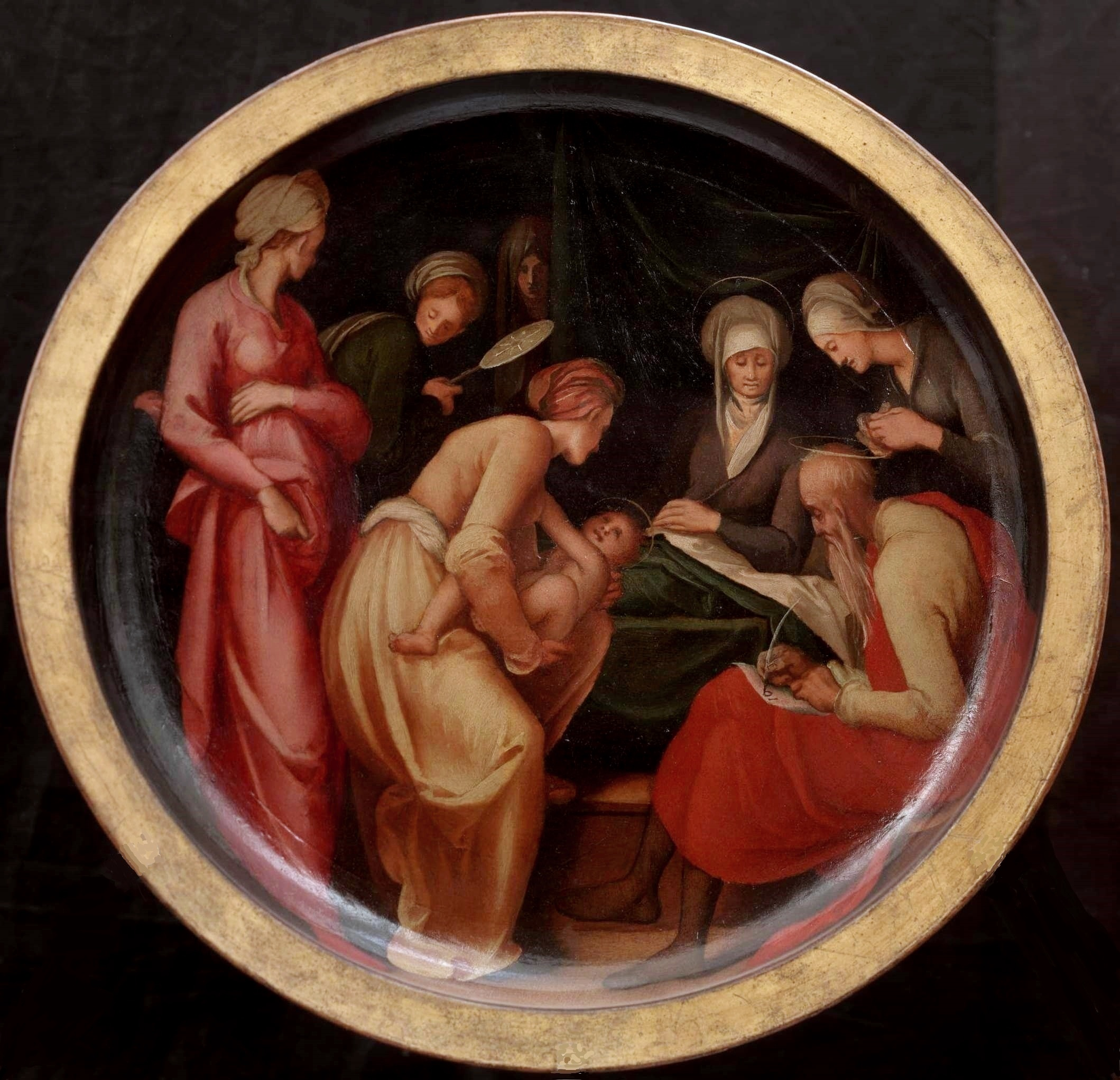
Pontormo, verso c. 1526, Birth of John the Baptist

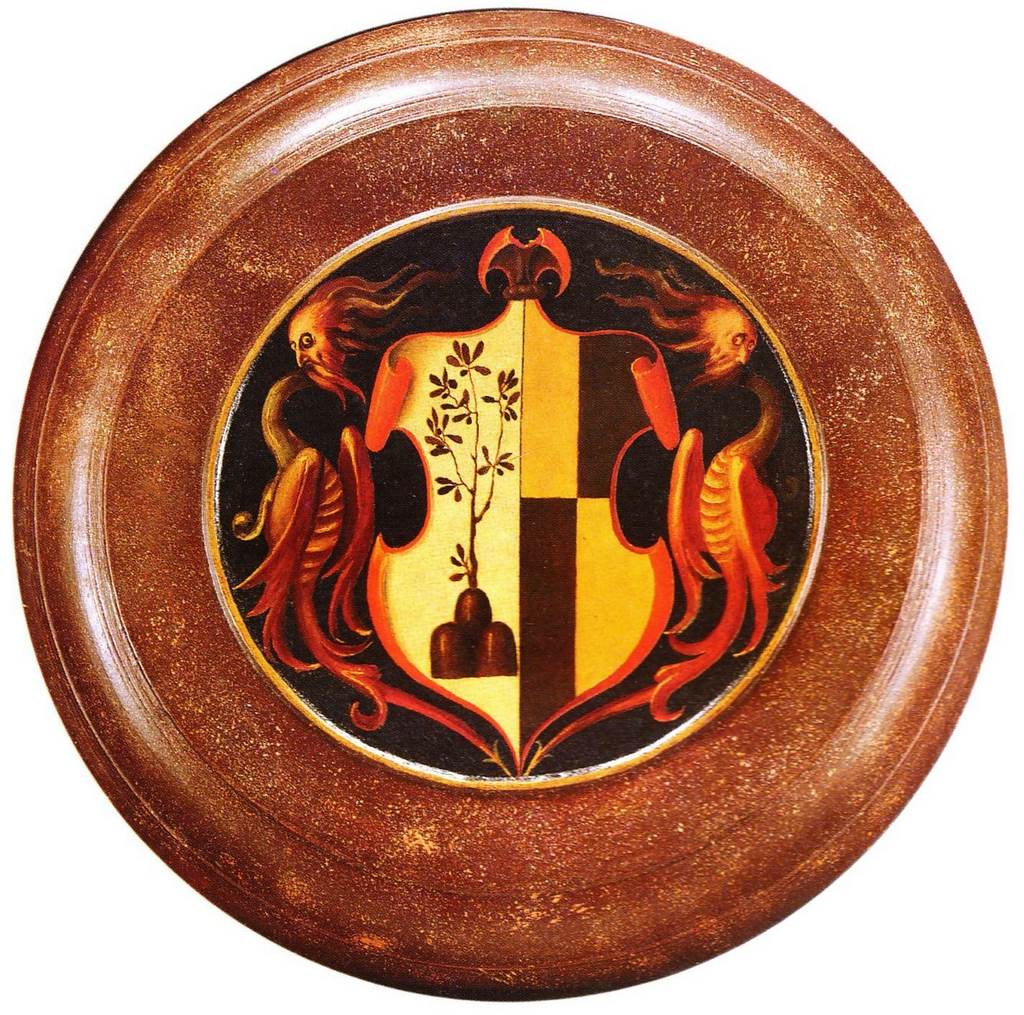
Heraldic verso of same

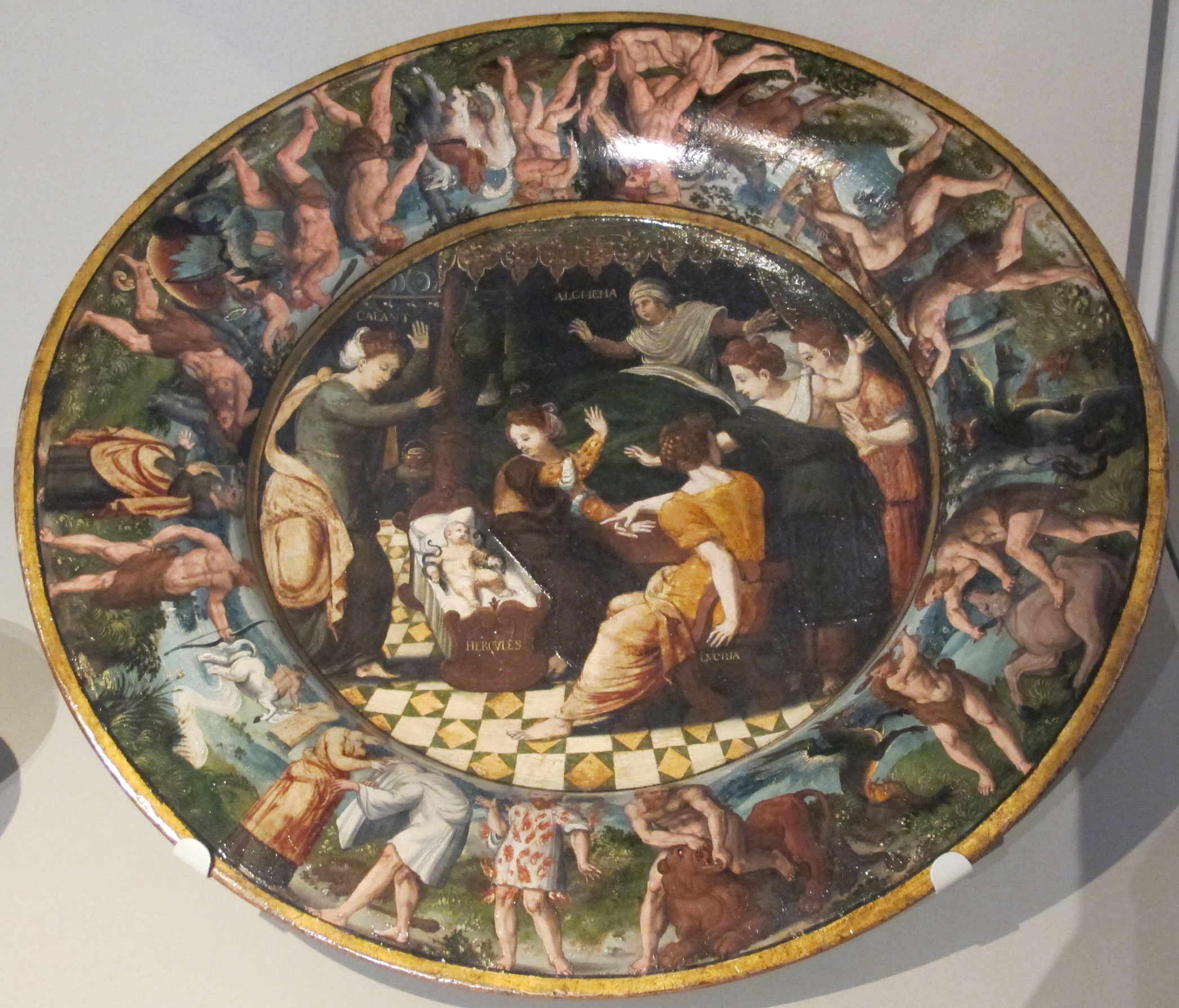
1530s, dish shape, with the Birth of Hercules

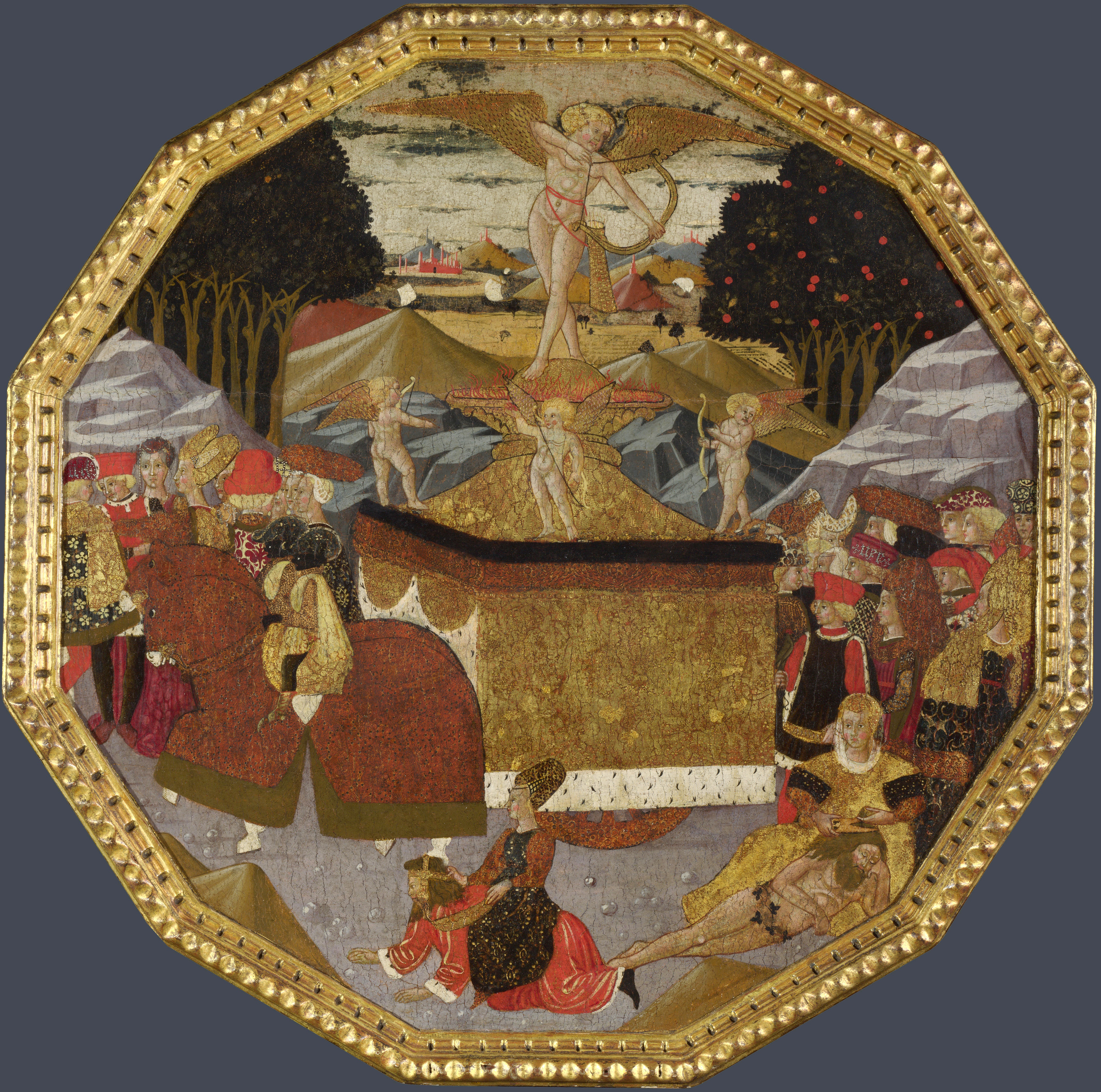
The Triumph of Love, twelve-sided by Apollonio di Giovanni di Tommaso and Marco del Buono, c. 1453–1455 (National Gallery, London)

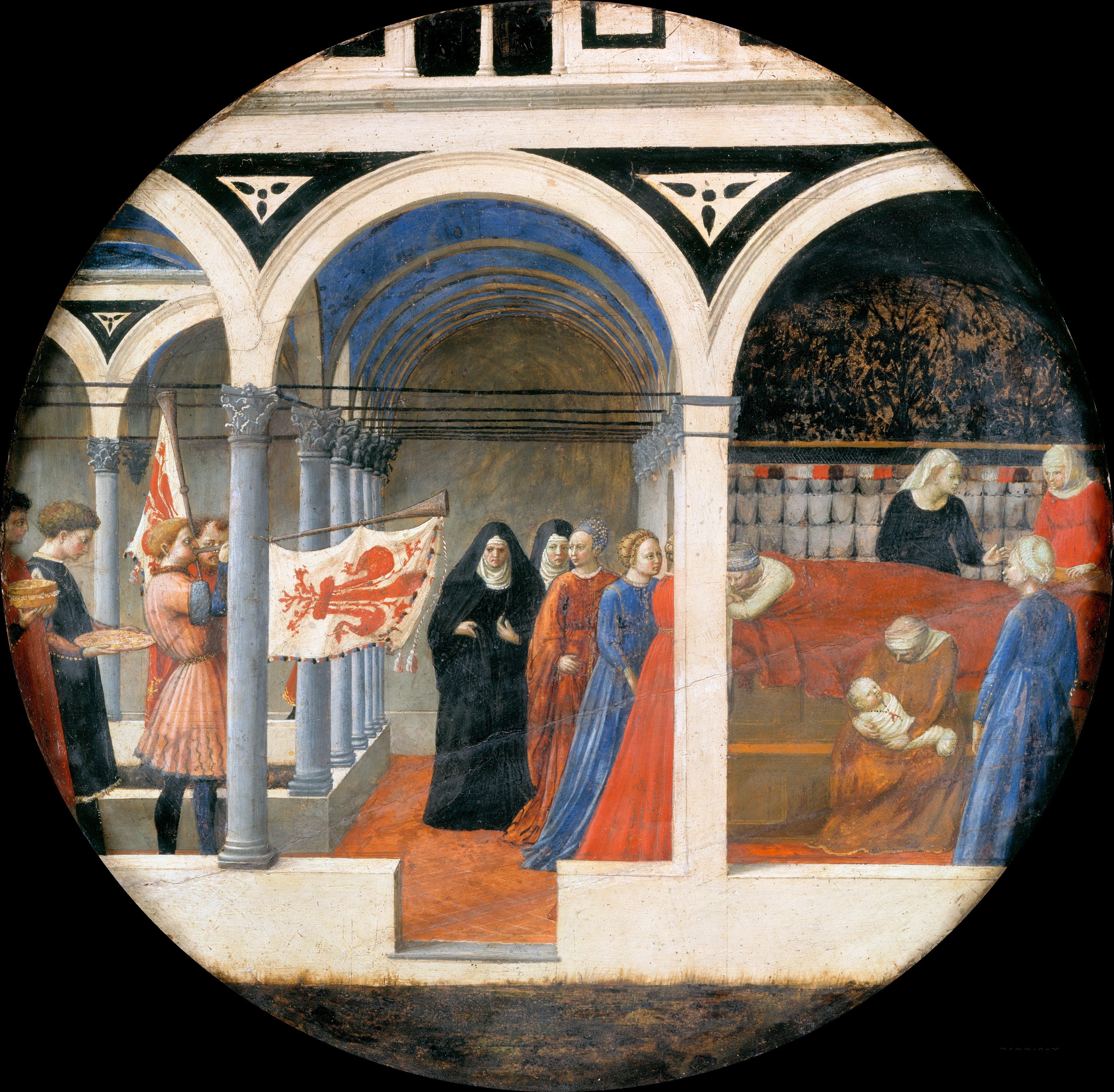
Masaccio, visits after birth, c. 1420, diameter: 56.5 cm (22.2 in)

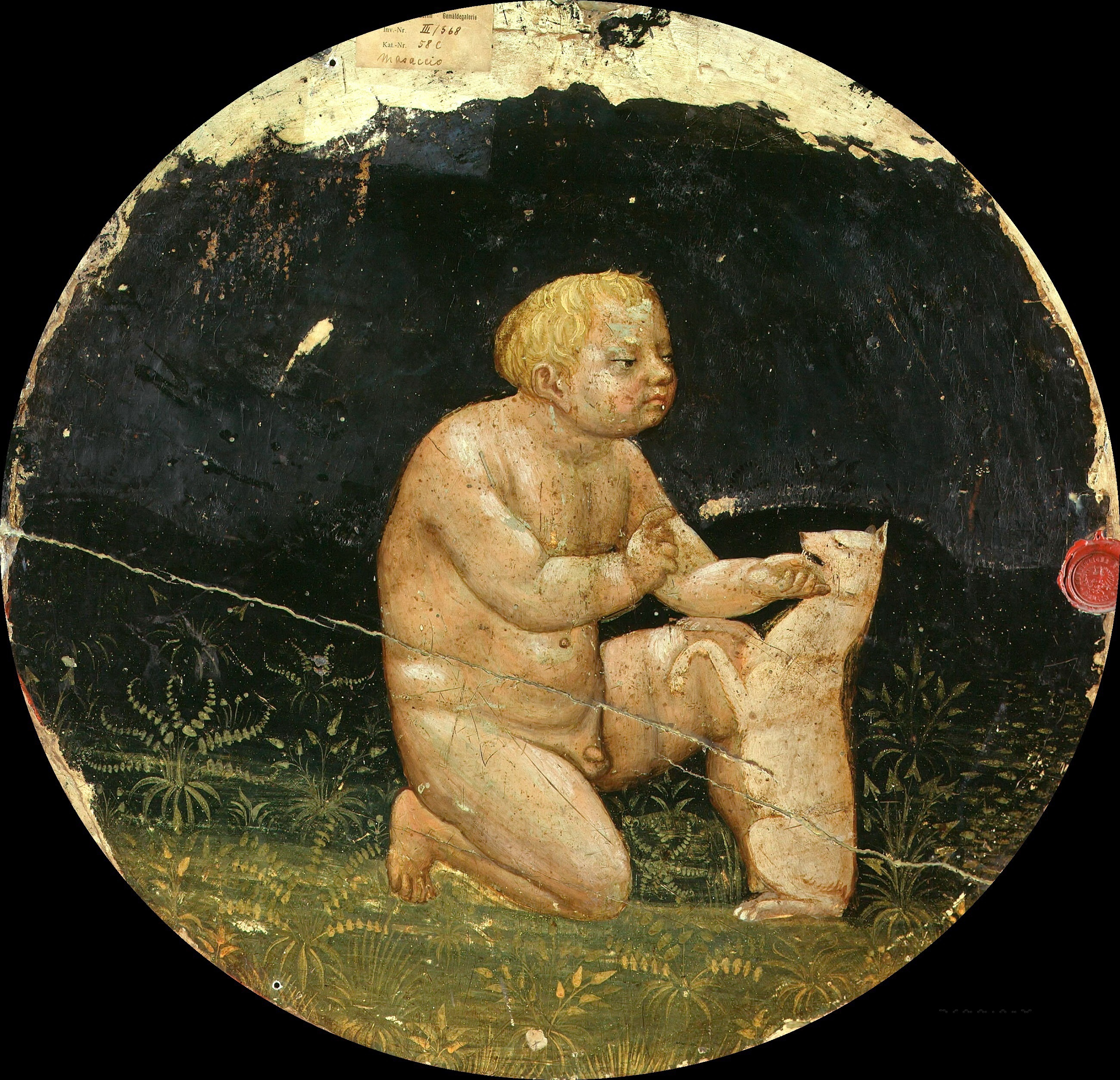
Verso of the same, perhaps by his brother

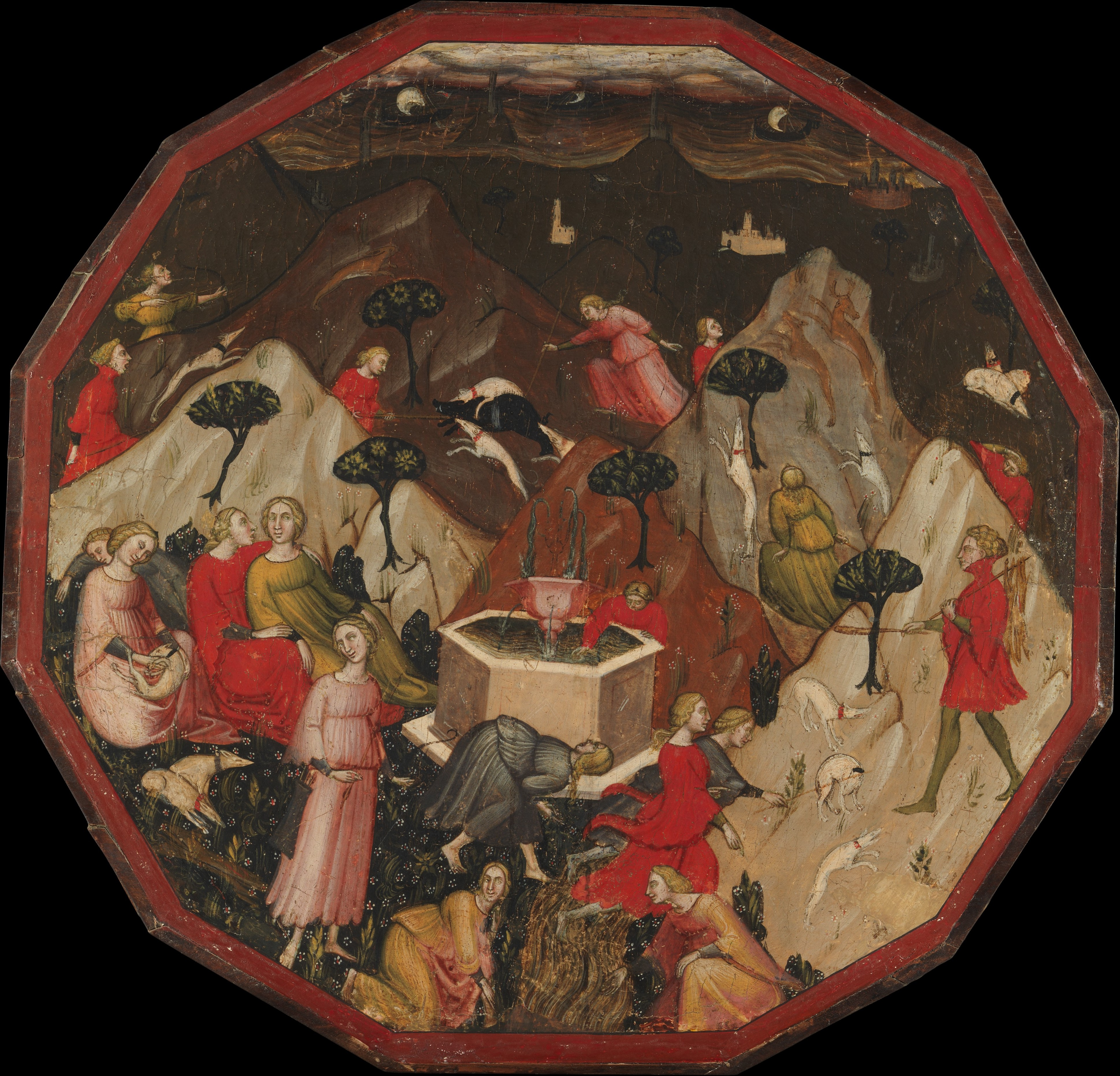
Scene from Boccaccio's Commedia delle ninfe Fiorentine, Ameto's Discovery of the Nymphs and Contest between the Shepherds Alcesto and Acaten, c. 1410

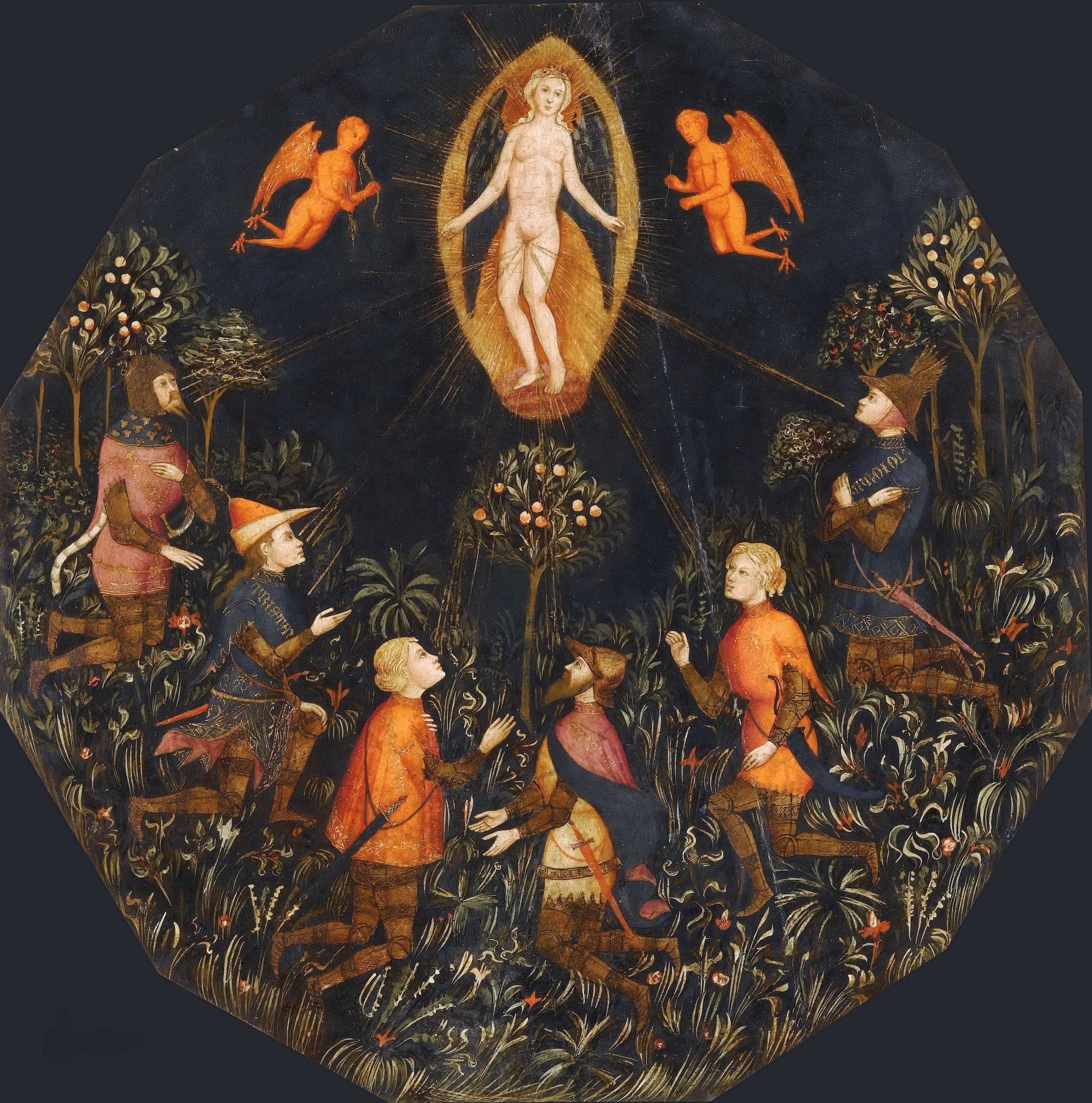
Triumph of Venus. the worshippers are Achilles, Tristan, Lancelot, Samson, Paris and Troilus.
