= Bartolomeo di Fruosino =

Italian painter

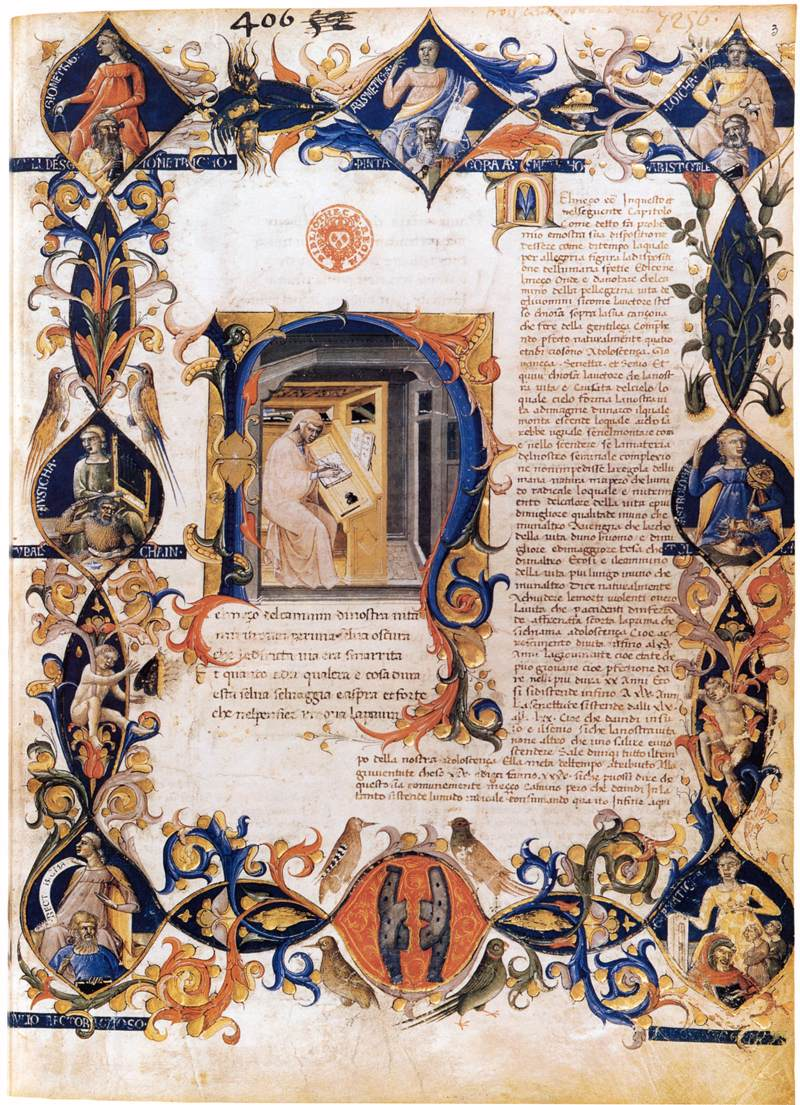
a page from Inferno, from the Divine Comedy by Dante Alighieri (Folio 3v), illuminated by Bartolomeo di Fruosino, Bibliothèque nationale de France, between 1430 and 1435

Bartolomeo di Fruosino (1366 or 1369 – 7 December 1441) was an Italian Renaissance painter and illuminator of the Florentine School. Apart from illuminations, he mainly painted deschi da parto (birth trays) and cassone panels.

Bartolomeo was born, and lived and worked his whole life in Florence. Part of the indecision about his age and birth year comes from differing statements he had made: in 1427 he gave 61, and 64 in 1433. His brother, Giovanni, was a sculptor and possibly a painter as well. Bartolomeo was enrolled in the Guild of Saint Luke of Florence with Agnolo Gaddi since 1394, and worked on the design of the Cappella del Sacro Cingolo of the Prato Cathedral. Between 1402 and 1438, he received many orders for the new hospital of St. Mary, and he died wealthy. He never married. He was also influenced by Lorenzo Monaco.

One illumination of a missal of the church San'Egidio in 1421 was signed by him, all other work has been assigned. His works can be found in the Metropolitan Museum of Art, Galleria dell'Accademia, and San Marco, Florence. He has been attributed with a fresco of the Incredulity of Thomas (c. 1415-20) in the Palazzo dei Vicari, Scarperia, Florence.
