= Apollonio di Giovanni di Tommaso =

Italian painter

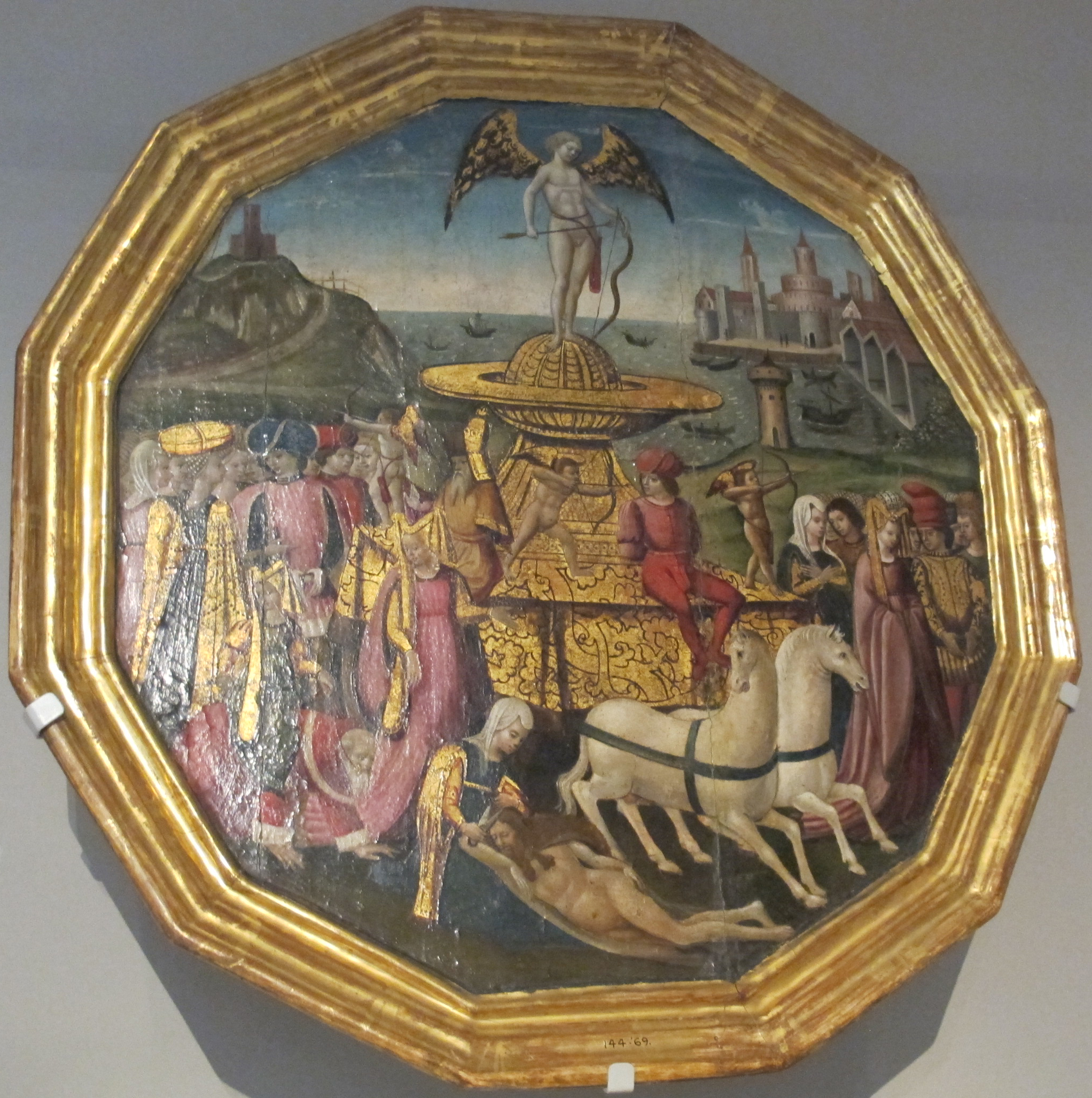
Birth tray, or Desco da parto

Apollonio di Giovanni di Tomaso (1414 – 1465), was an Italian painter.

== Biography ==
He was born in Florence and is also known as the "Master of the Jarves Cassone". Apollonio di Giovanni was recorded in Florence 1446 where he ran a workshop specialised in producing wedding chests known as cassoni and other such furniture. He died in 1465. He worked in partnership with the woodworker Marco del Buono Giamberti, whose son became Apollonio's pupil and heir.

== Works ==
Apollonio or his surviving atelier as run by Marco del Buono Giamberti are now credited with the creation of the illuminated golden tarot deck formerly known as the "Charles VI" or "Grigonneur", now normally called "the Estensi" after the noble Italian d'Este family who once owned it.

Its 17 remaining cards are held by the Bibliothèque nationale de France. From Dec. 2021 to March 2022, the deck was exhibited at the French national playing card museum in Issy with other famous Italian illuminated tarots, such as the Visconti-Sforza tarot, in a show called Tarots Enlumines.

This masterpiece was further examined in a special technical Study Day conference on March 11, 2022.
