= Marco del Buono =

Italian painter

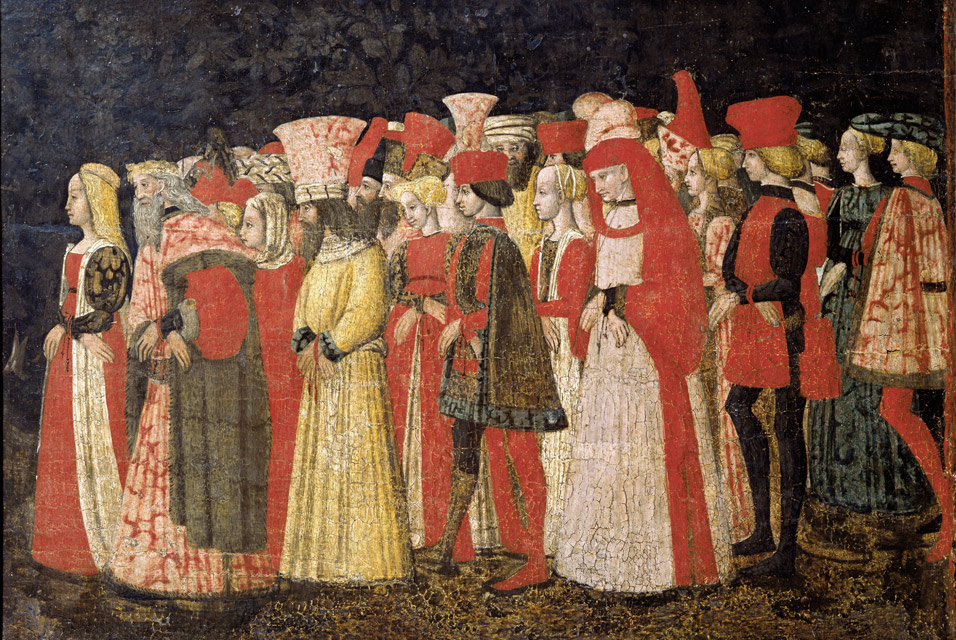
Love procession panel scene by Marco del Buono and Apollonio di Giovanni di Tommaso, Accademia Carrara di Belle Arti di Bergamo, 1440s

Marco del Buono, also Marco del Buono Giamberti, (1402–1489) was an Italian painter and woodworker.

== Life ==
Marco del Buono was documented in Florence as a member of the "Arte dei Medici e Speziali" Physicians' and Apothecaries’ Guild for painters in 1426. From dated works we know by 1446 he was in partnership with Apollonio di Giovanni di Tommaso in the production of cassones (marriage chests), such as the Cassone with a Tournament Scene attributed to Apollonio's workshop. A cassone painted with The Conquest of Trebizond from Palazzo Strozzi, with Strozzi armorial bearings, one of the minority of cassone panels remaining integral to its cassone, is conserved at the Metropolitan Museum of Art.
