= Giovanni di ser Giovanni Guidi =

Italian painter (1406–1486)

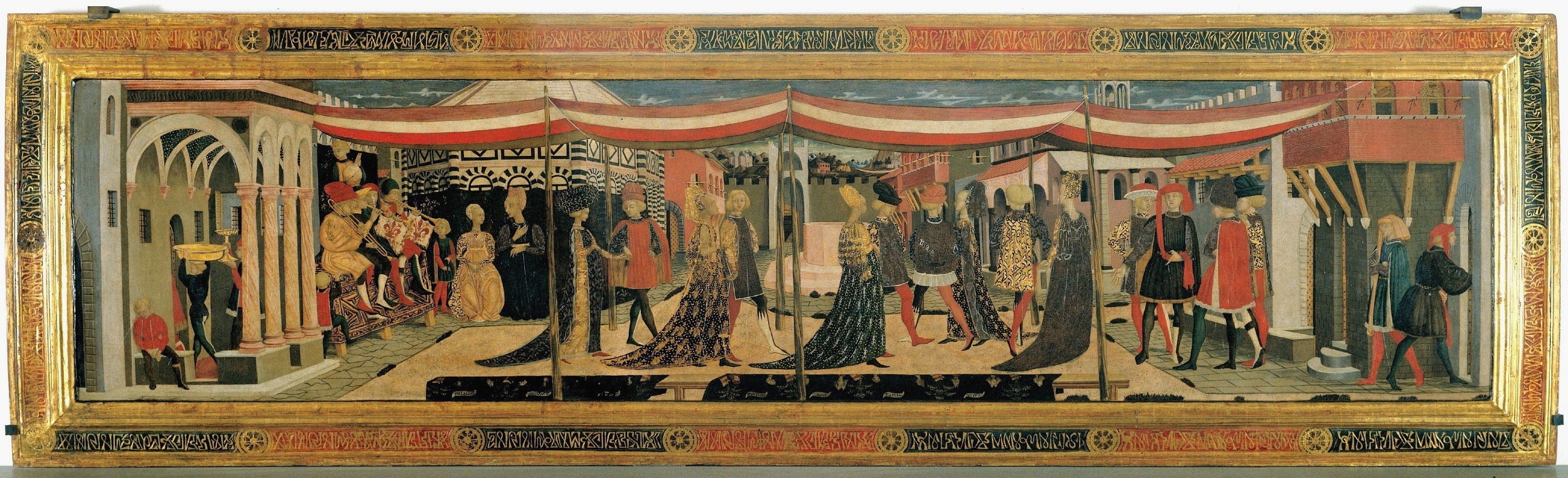
Cassone Adimari, with The Triumph of Love shown as taking place in Piazza del Duomo in Florence; for a cassone

Giovanni di Ser Giovanni (1406 – 1486), also known as Lo Scheggia, or "the Splinter" was an Italian Renaissance painter in Florence who was born in San Giovanni Valdarno and was the younger brother of the famous Masaccio.

He and his workshop mostly produced works such as cassone panels and desci da parto (birth trays) for Florence alongside larger works for churches in the country.

== Biography ==
Born in San Giovanni in Altura, now San Giovanni Valdarno, he moved with his family to Florence in 1417. Between 1420 and 1421 he came into a relationship with Lorenzo Bicci, probably as an assistant in his workshop. In 1426 he was registered in Pisa as a guarantor for his brother Masaccio, and he refused his brother's inheritance in 1428, for the inconsistency. In 1429 the artist had his own workshop in Florence in the parish of Sant'Apollinare.

In 1430 he joined the Guild of Saint Luke. He joined the "Guild of the Legnaioli" as a "forzerinario", or chest maker; then in 1433 he matriculated in the Art of Doctors and Apothecaries. Between 1436 and 1440 he provided the cartoons for the Sacristy of the Florentine Cathedral.

In these years, he manufactured and painted luxury furniture especially for the clients in town and in the country he produced altarpieces and frescoes, a signed fragment of the latter being the Martyrdom of San Lorenzo in church of San Lorenzo in San Giovanni Valdarno. In 1449 on the occasion of the birth of Lorenzo de' Medici Lo Scheggia painted the Desco da parto with the Triumph of Fame now in the Metropolitan Museum of Art in New York. Lo Scheggia died in 1486 and was buried in the basilica of Santa Croce.

Also included in his catalog of works are: a Madonna and Child (1450), originally in the church of San Lorenzo in San Giovanni Valdarno and a tempera on a panel depicting the Choir of Angel Musicians, part of the door from the vestry of the organ Oratory of San Lorenzo. In the former Abbey of Vallumbrosan Order in Soffena is also preserved a fine Annunciation, while in the Accademia Gallery in Florence is the so-called Adimari Cassone, a panel with a party scene set in a city landscape in perspective, in which the Florence Baptistery is recognisable.

== Gallery ==
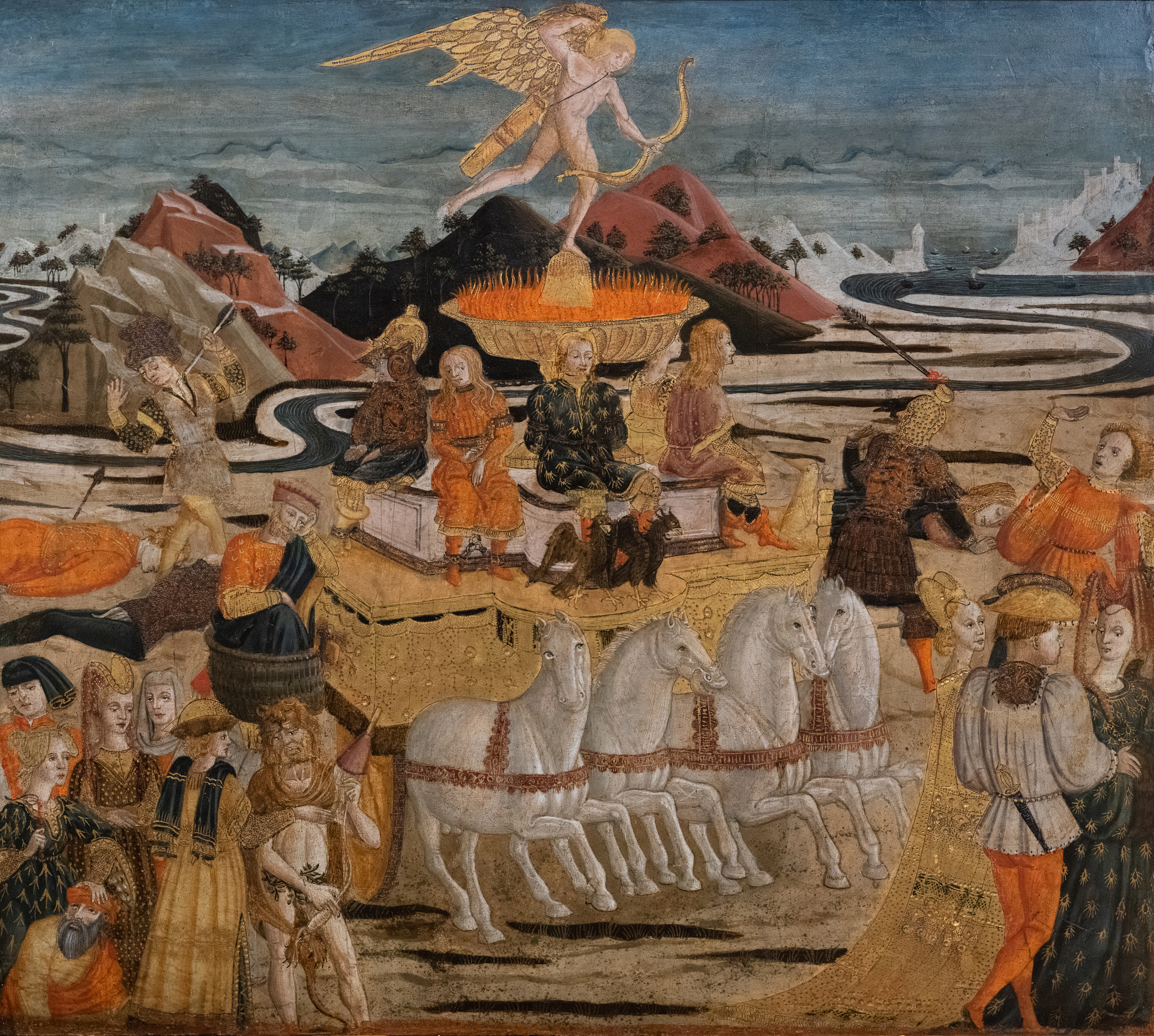
Triumph of Love

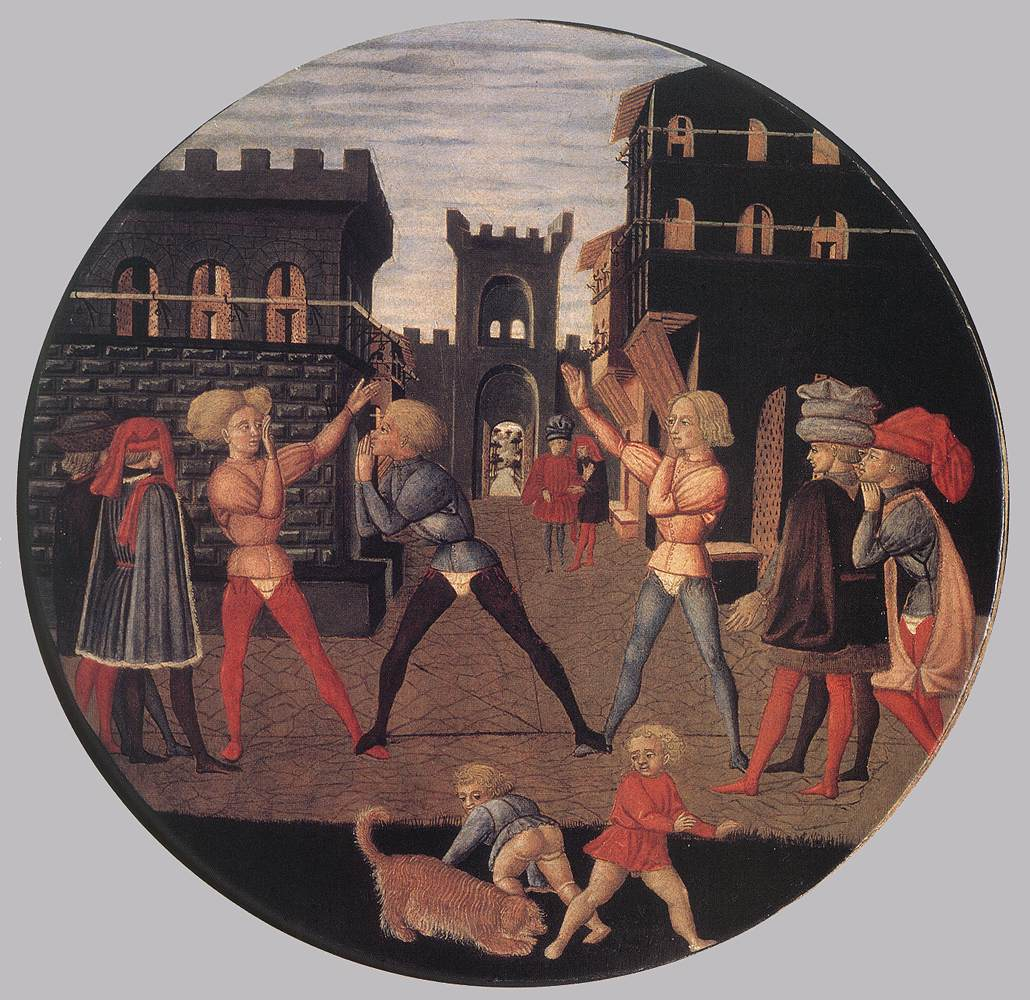
Desco da parto, with a game of Civettino, recto c. 1450, by Giovanni di ser Giovanni Guidi

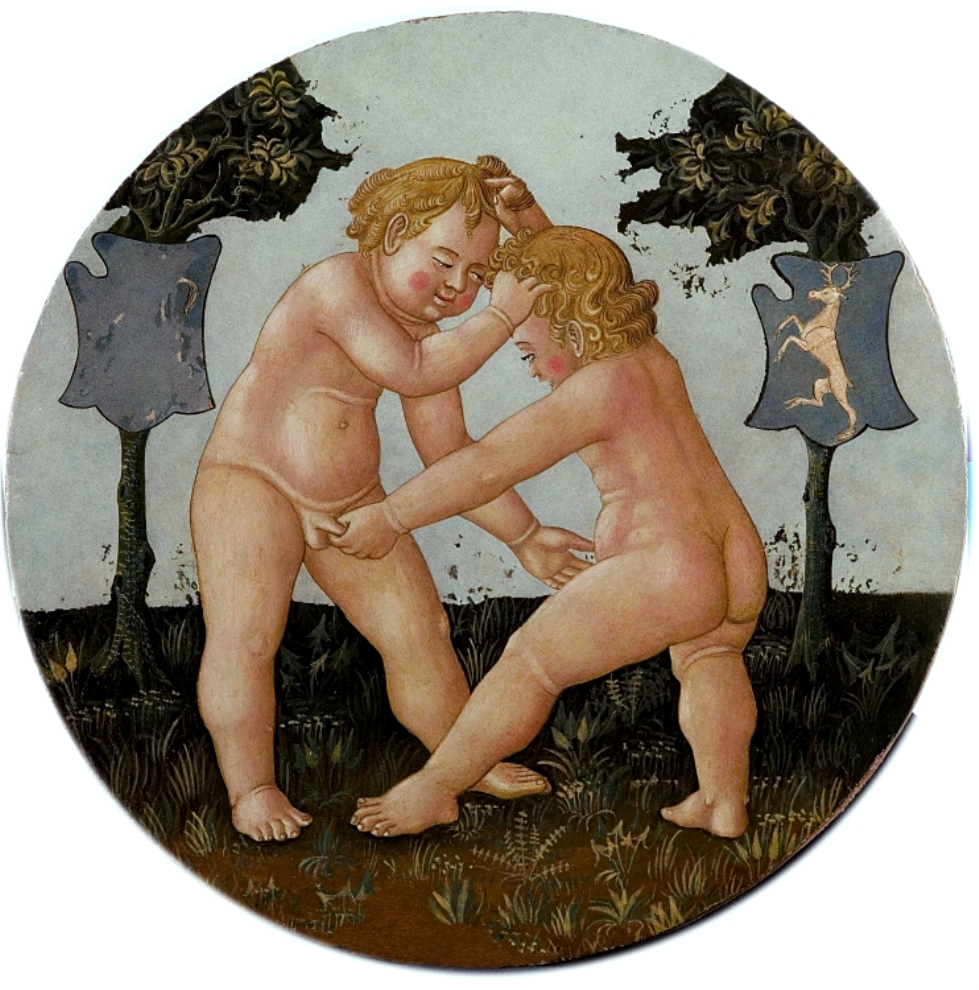
Verso, as last. Two toddlers engage in no holds barred wrestling

== Sources ==
- Pernis, Maria Grazia; Adams, Laurie (2006). Lucrezia Tornabuoni De' Medici and the Medici Family in the Fifteenth Century. New York: Peter Lang Publishing, Inc. ISBN 978-0820476452.

== Literature ==
Alessandro Delpriori, La giovinezza dello Scheggia e una Madonna col Bambino all'alba del Rinascimento, Firenze, Frascione Arte, 2011. ISBN 978-88-904451-1-8
