= Gallery of the Sistine Chapel ceiling =

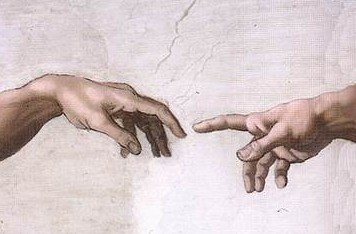
The iconic image of the Hand of God giving life to Adam

The Sistine Chapel ceiling, painted by Michelangelo between 1508 and 1512, is one of the most renowned artworks of the High Renaissance. Central to the ceiling decoration are nine scenes from the Book of Genesis of which The Creation of Adam is the best known, the hands of God and Adam being reproduced in countless imitations. The complex design includes several sets of individual figures, both clothed and nude, which allowed Michelangelo to fully demonstrate his skill in creating a huge variety of poses for the human figure, and have provided an enormously influential pattern book of models for other artists ever since.

== Gallery ==
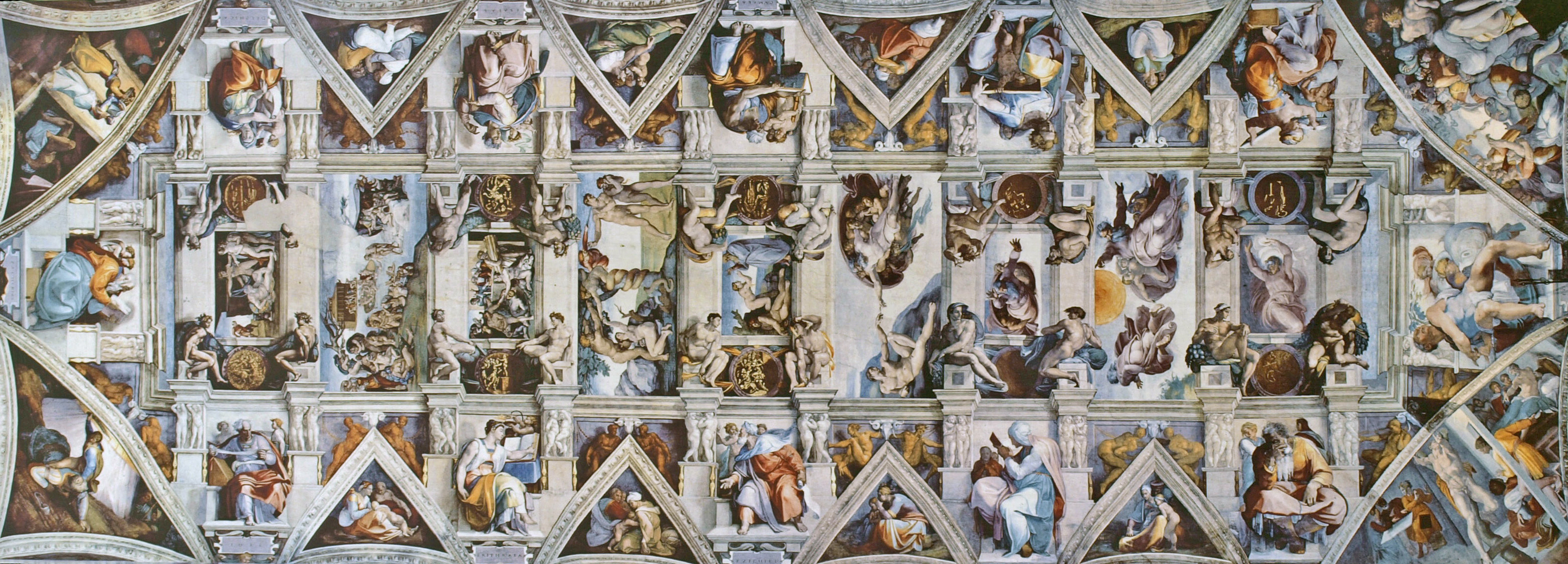
The ceiling. Not shown are the lunettes around the windows, also painted by Michelangelo; see plan below.
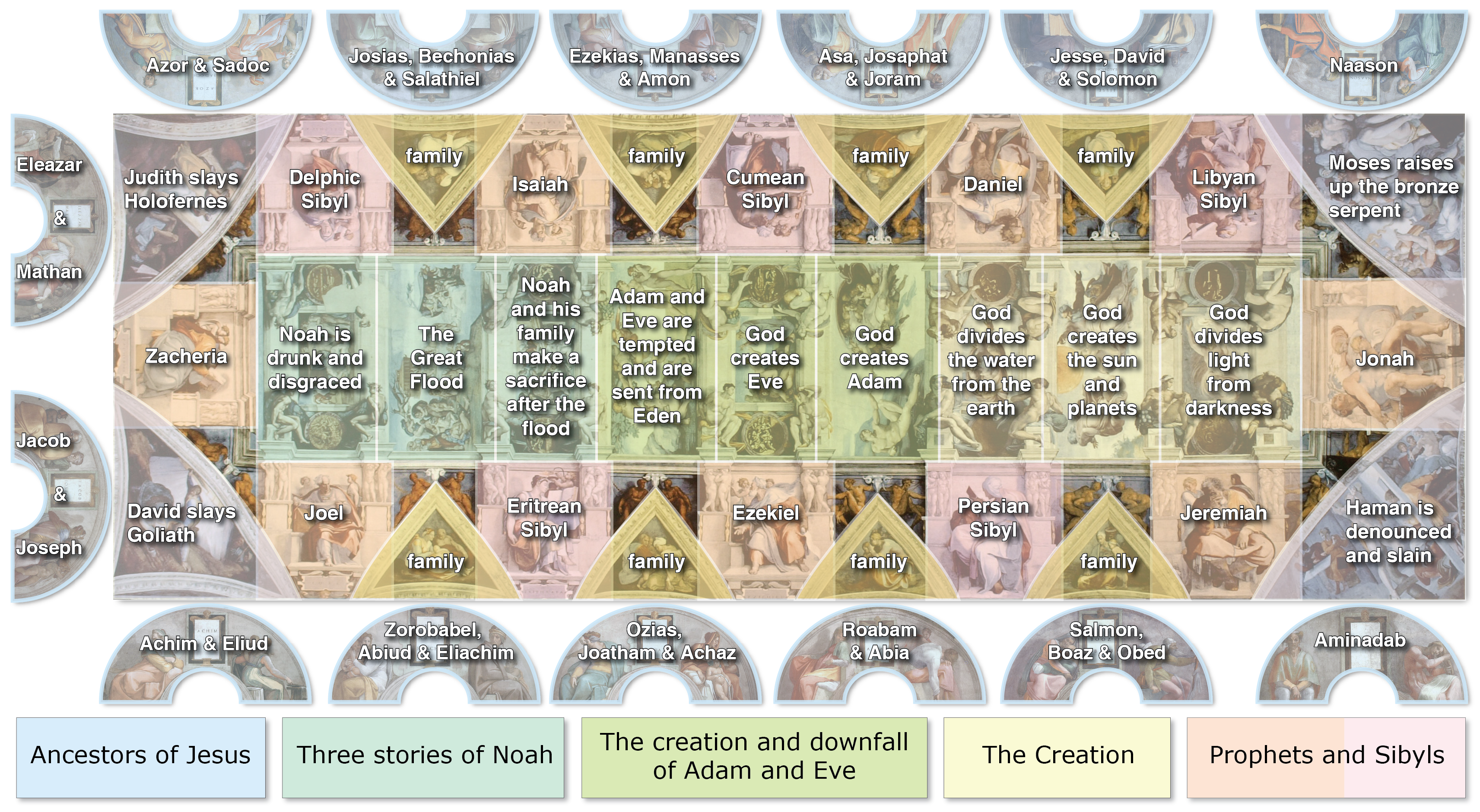
Plan of the pictorial elements of the ceiling showing the division of the narrative scenes into three themes

=== Biblical narratives ===
Along the centre of the ceiling are nine scenes depicting the Story of Creation, the Downfall of Humanity and the Story of Noah as told in the Book of Genesis.

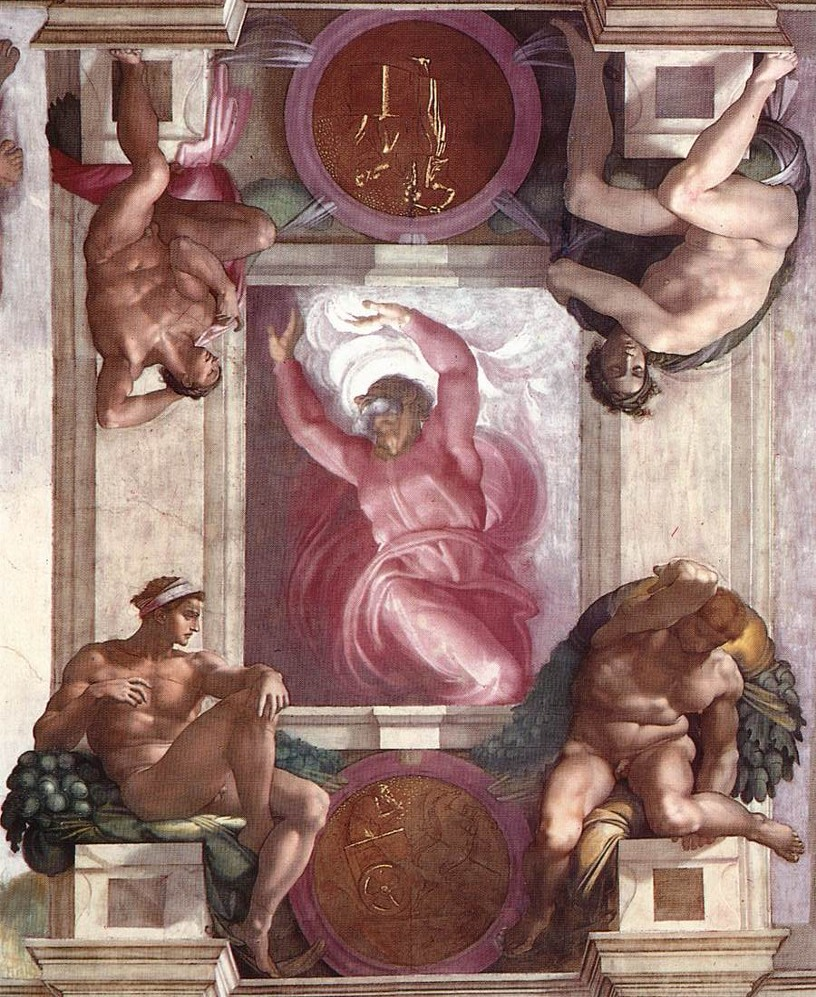
The First Day of Creation, God divides light from Darkness. This was the final narrative to be painted.

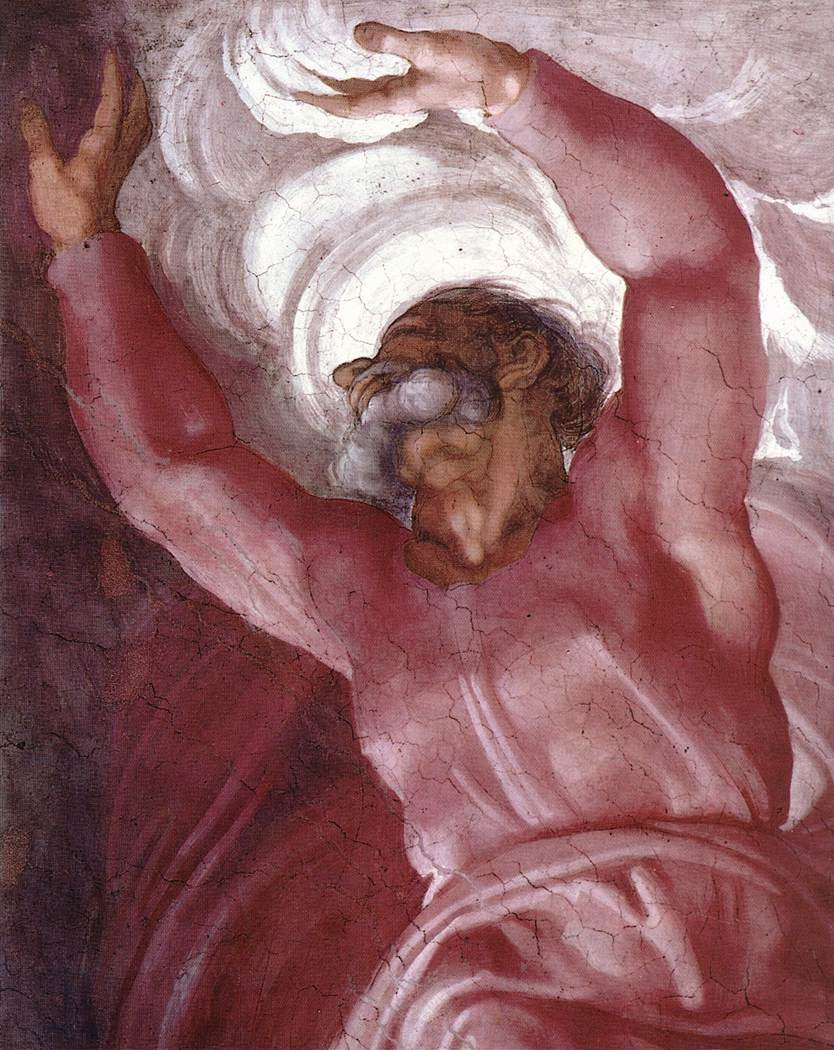
Detail of the figure of God, which was painted by Michelangelo in a single day and may represent Michelangelo himself, painting the ceiling

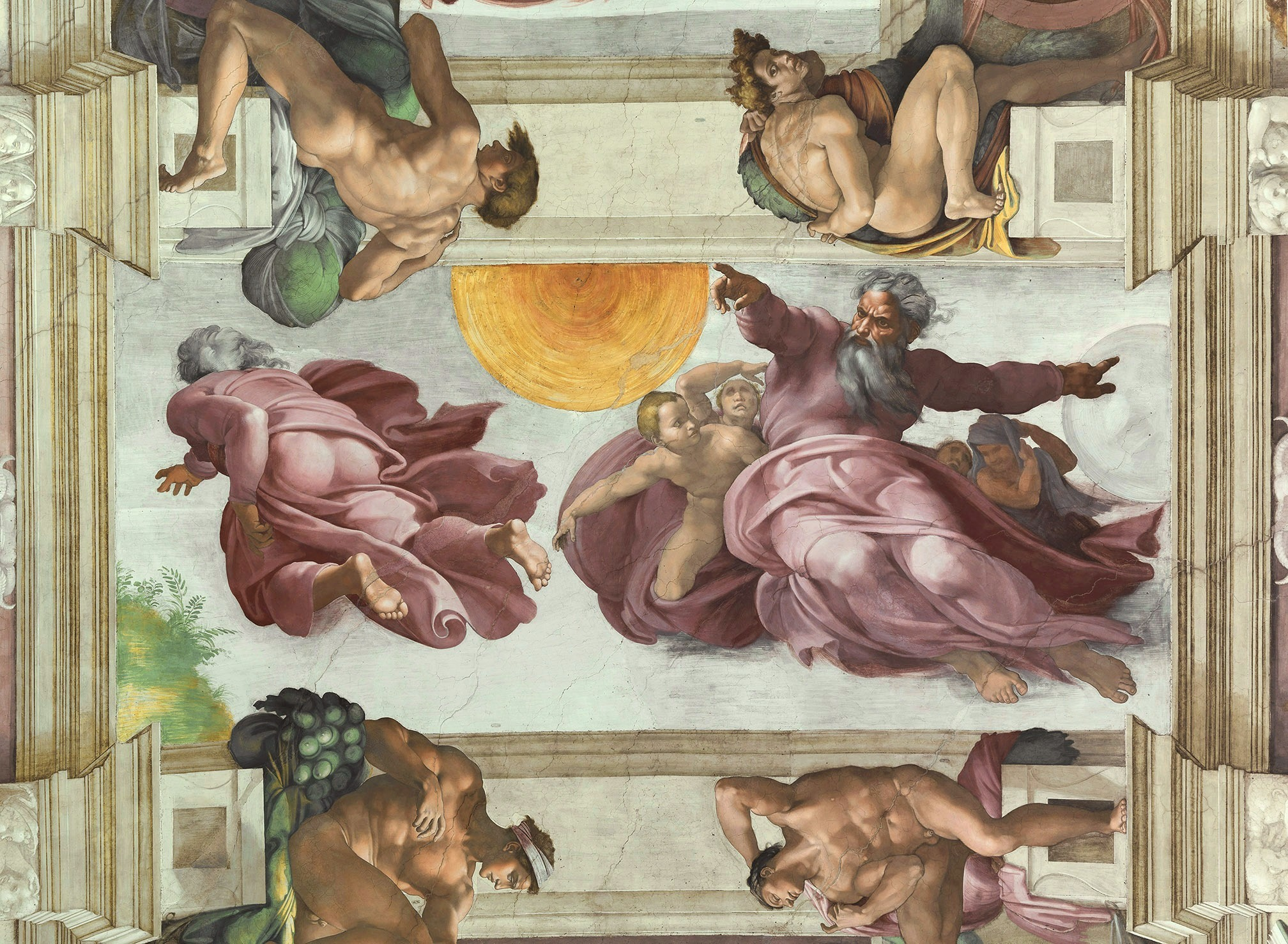
To the left, God creates the Earth and, to the right, God creates the Sun to light the day and the Moon to light the night.

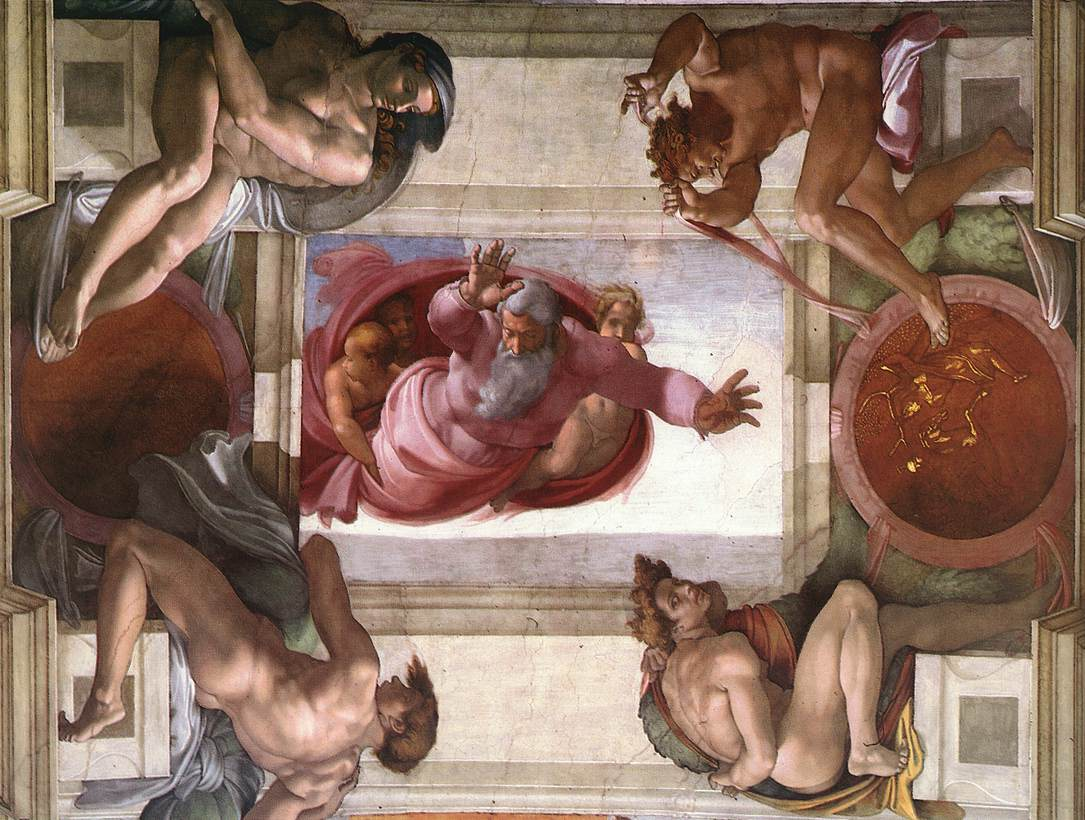
God separating the waters from the heavens. (Context)

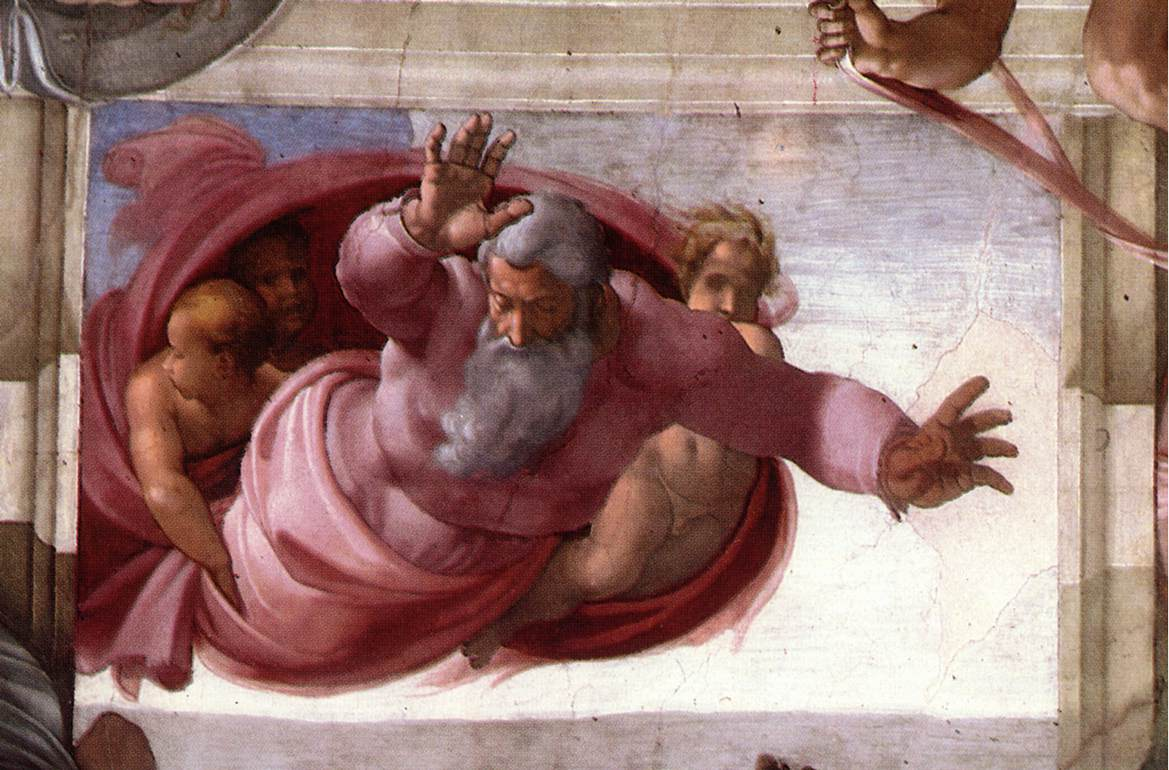
Separating the waters (detail)

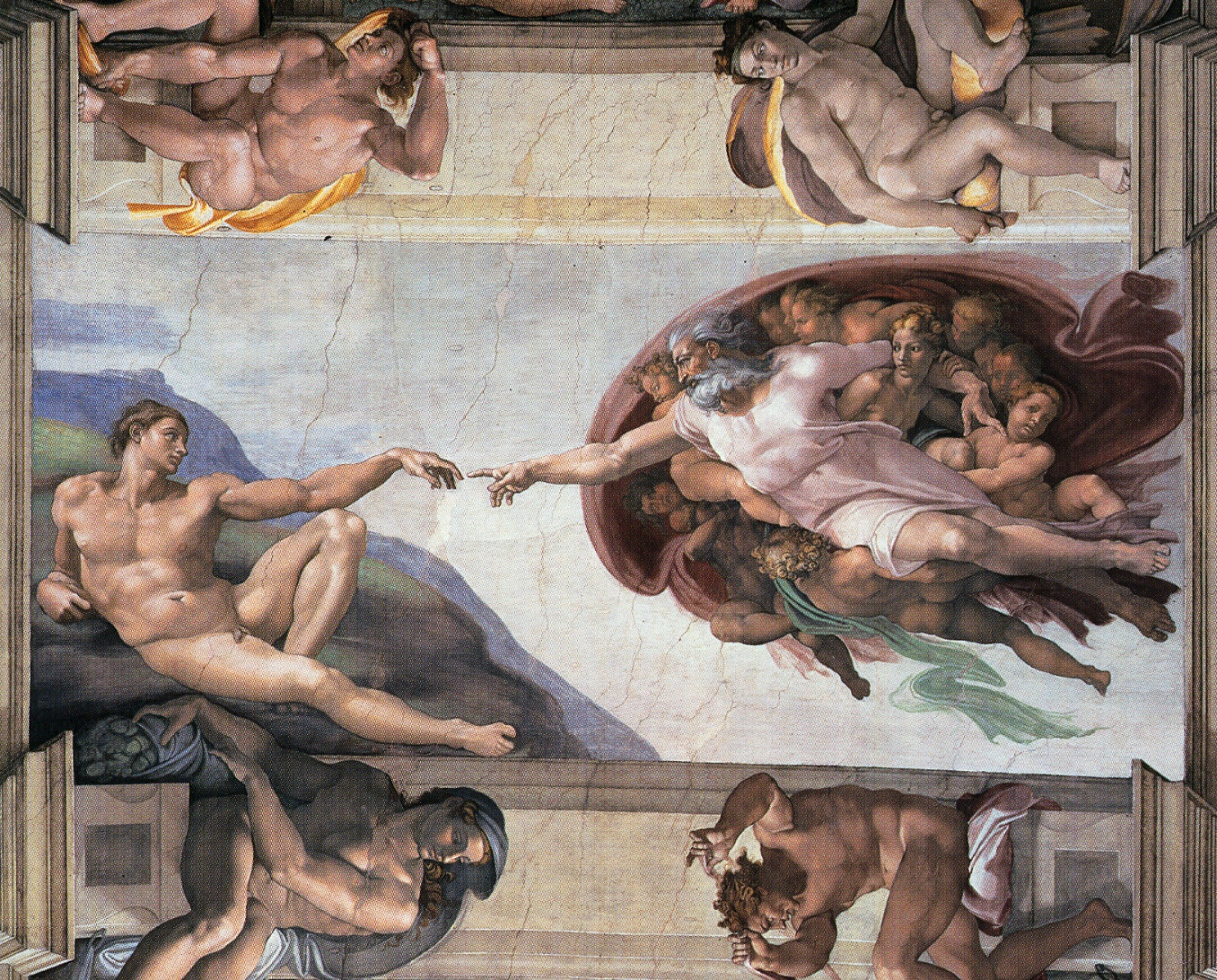
The Creation of Adam shows God giving life to the first man, while Eve, the first woman, watches from beneath his cloak.

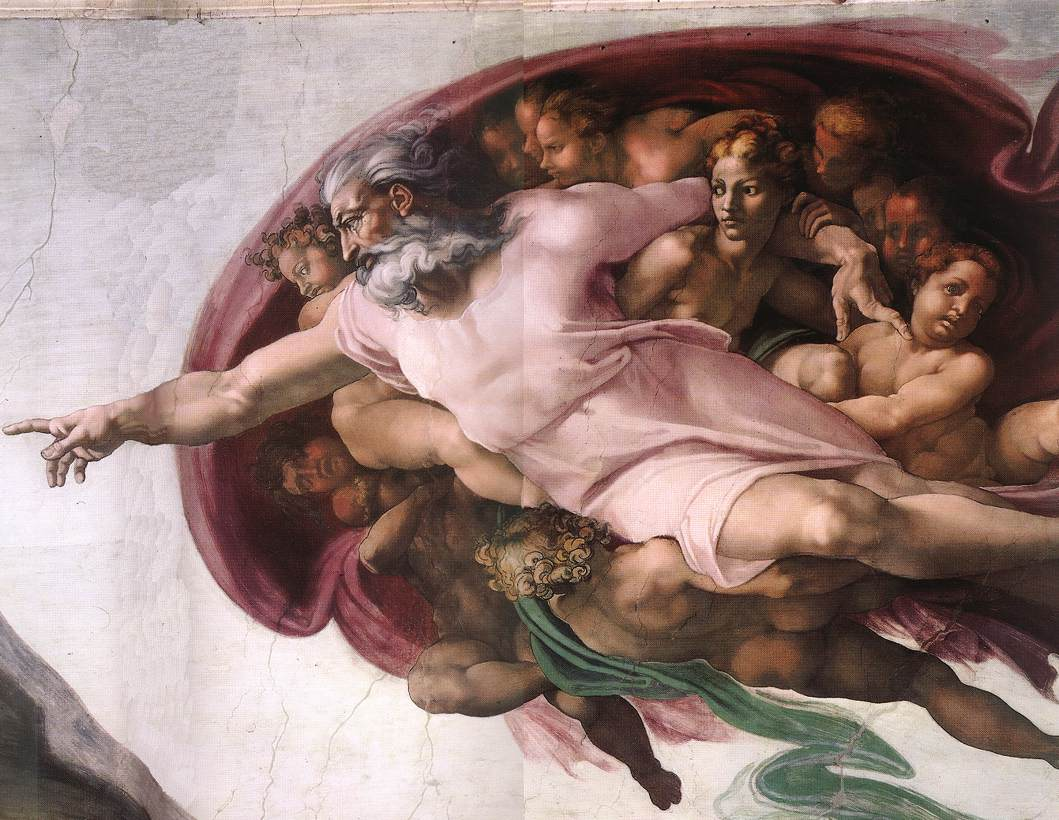
Detail of God from The Creation of Adam

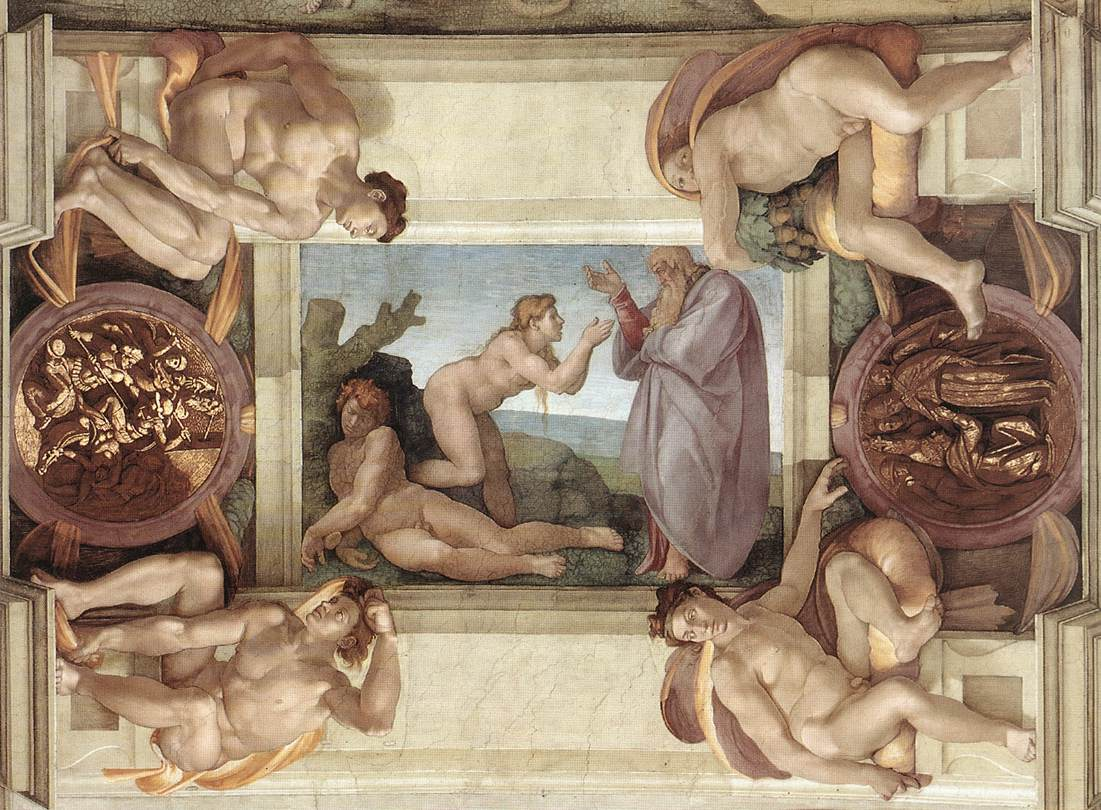
The Creation of Eve is based on a sculpture in Bologna.

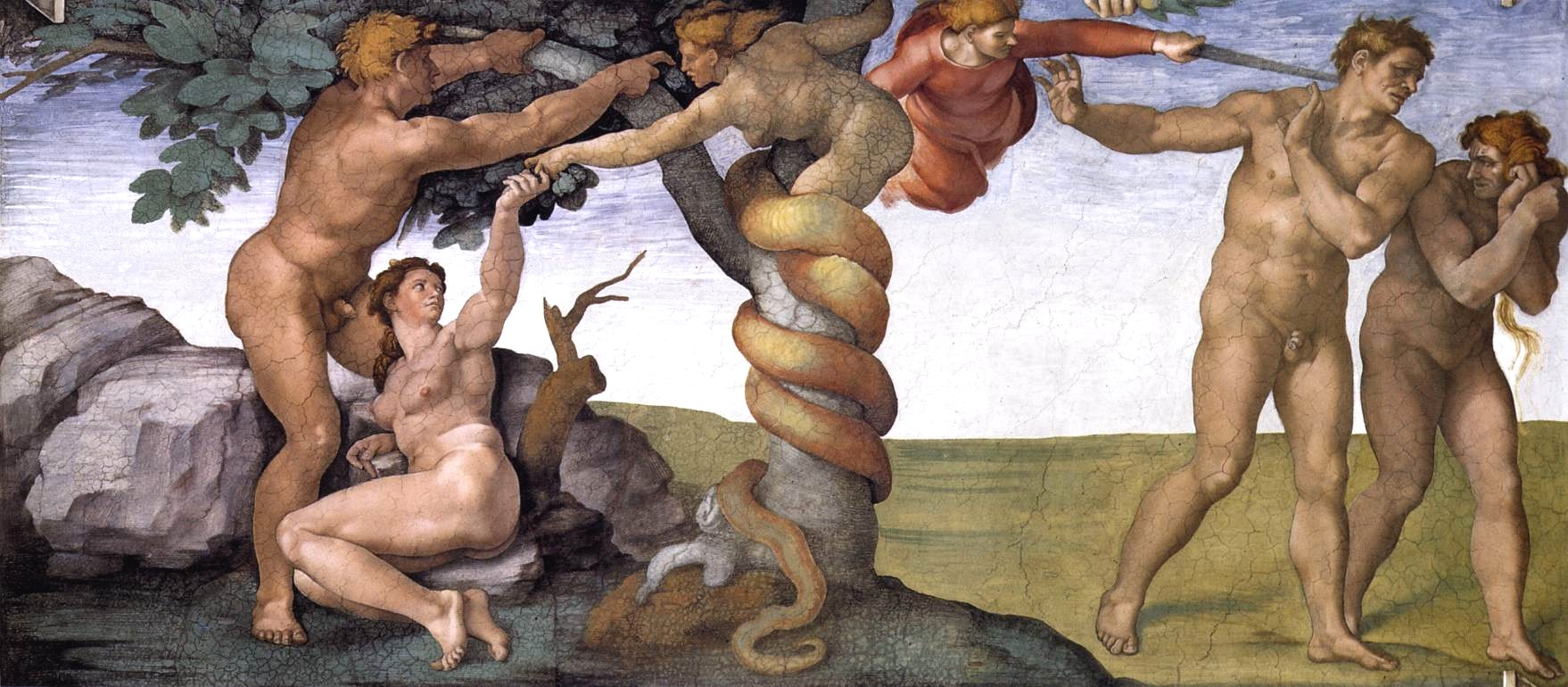
The Downfall of Adam and Eve and their Expulsion from the Garden of Eden. Two episodes are combined in a single frame.

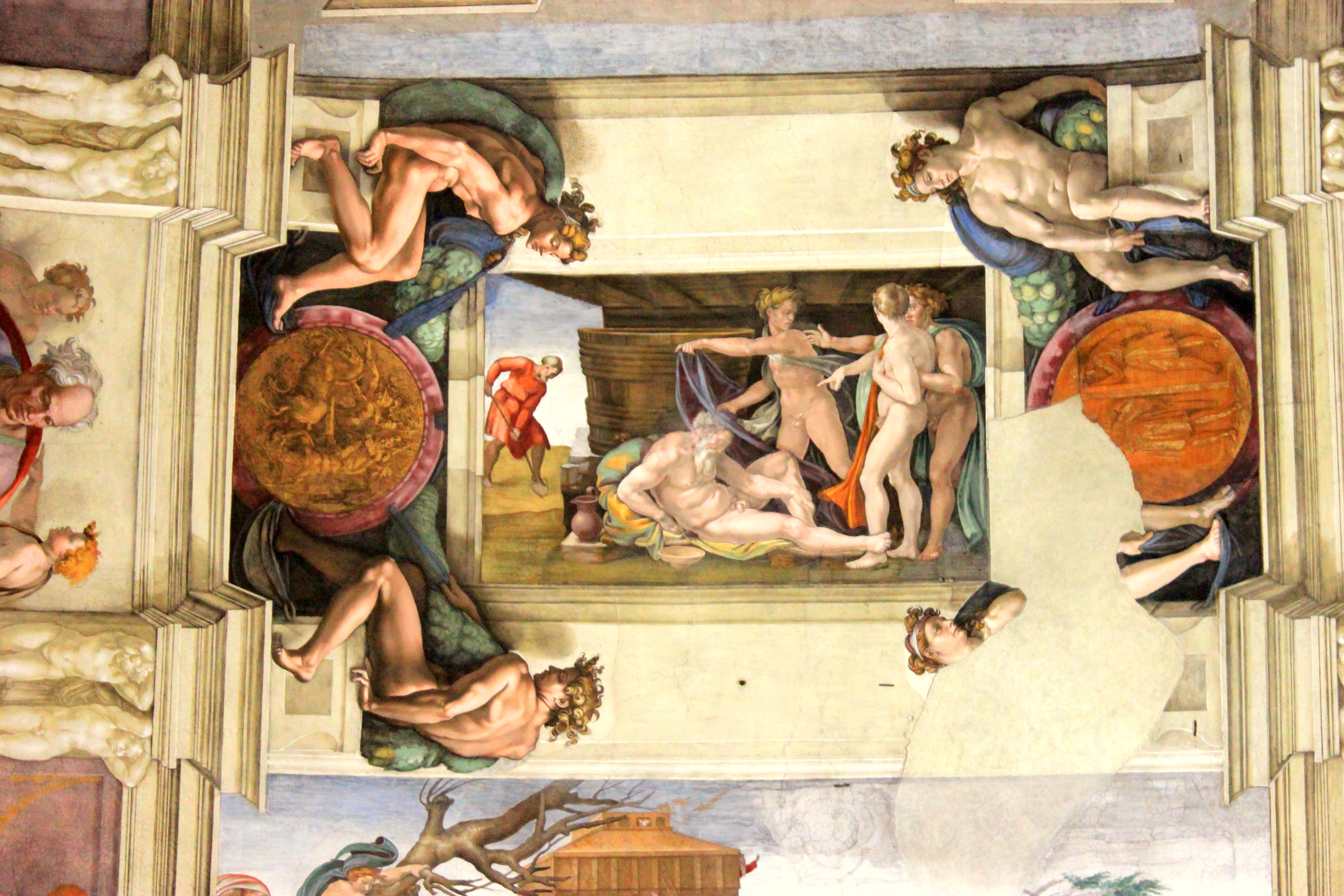
Drunkenness of Noah

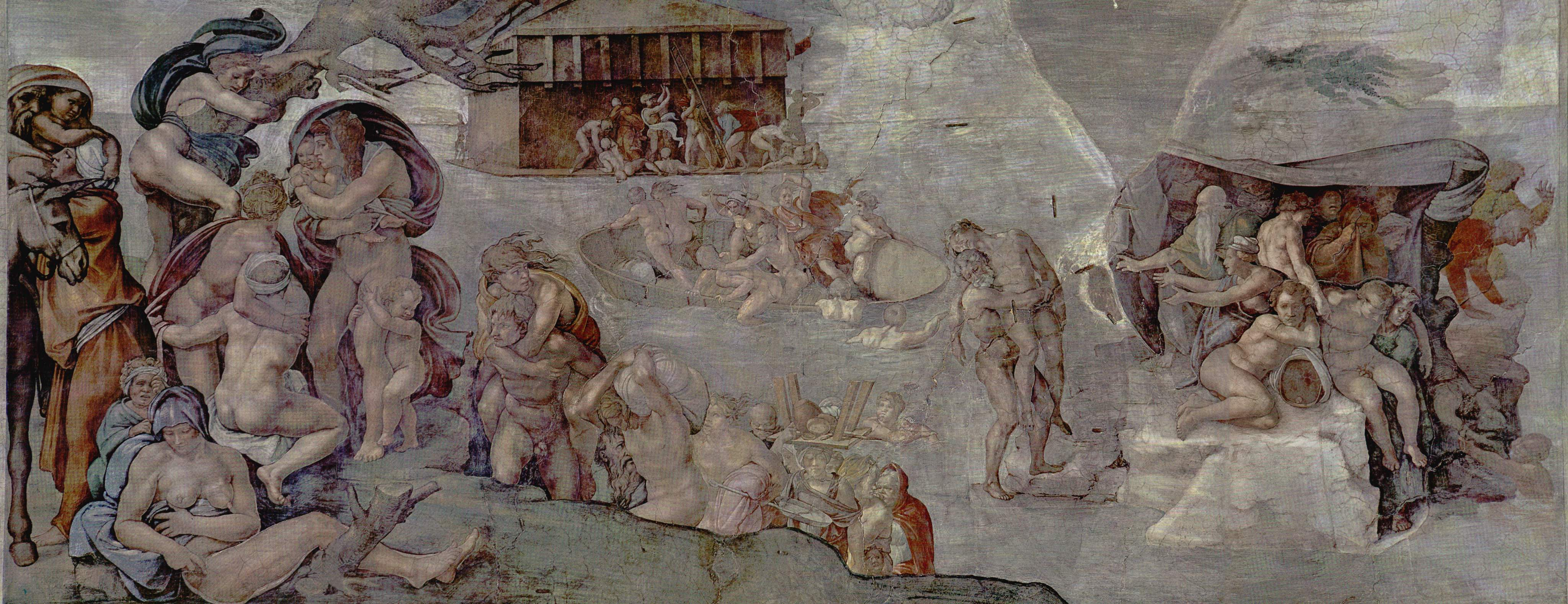
Noah's Ark floats in the background while people struggle to escape the rising water of the Great Flood.

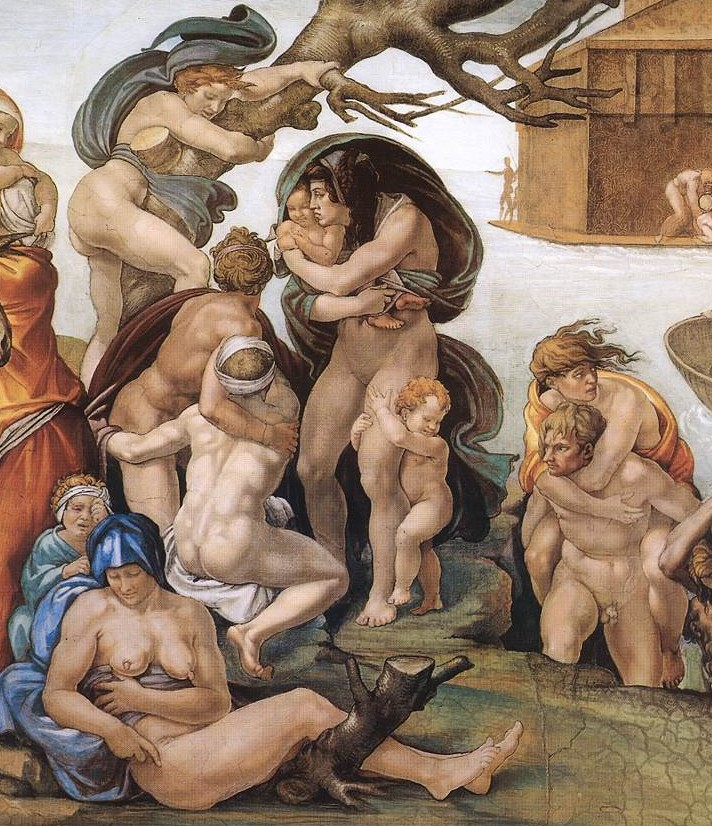
Detail from the scene of the Great Flood

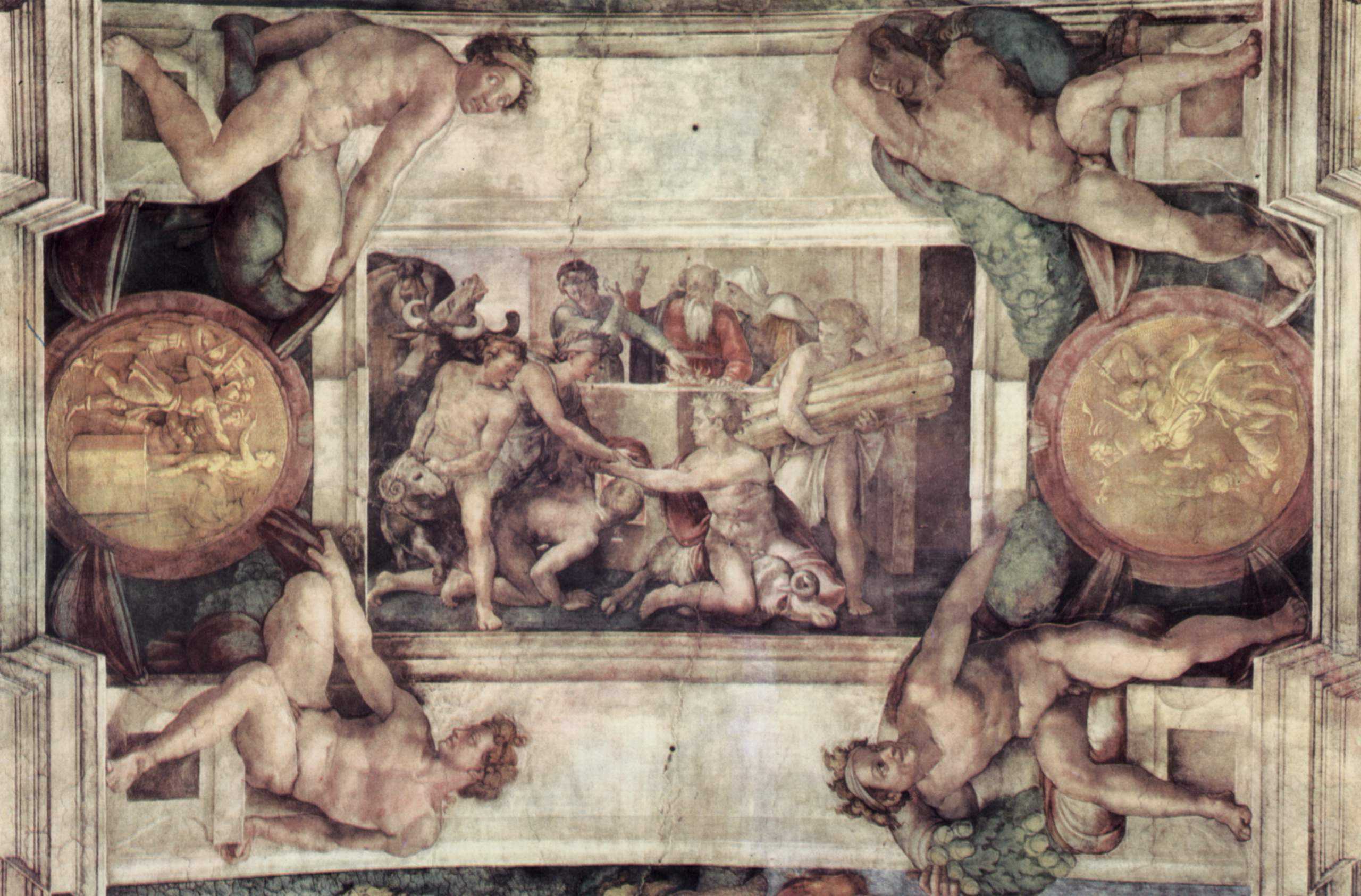
The sacrifice of Noah after the Flood (in context, before restoration). This picture is thought by some to represent The sacrifices of Cain and Abel.

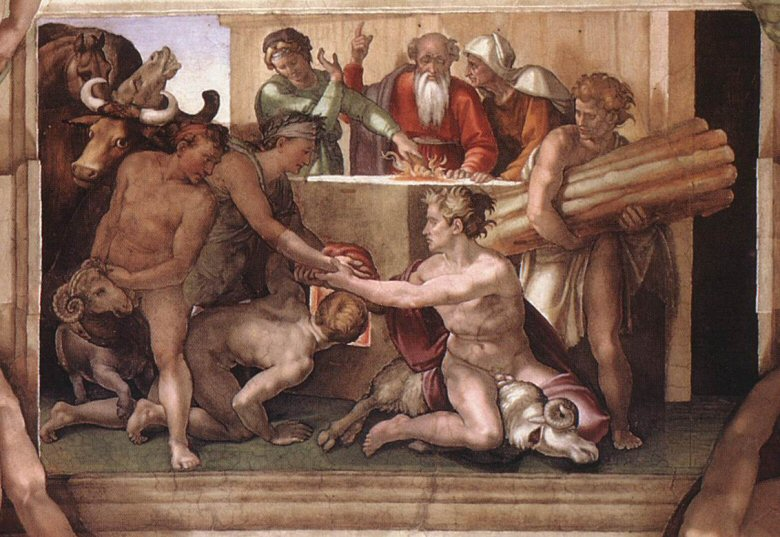
Sacrifice of Noah (post-restoration. Detail)

=== Prophets and Sibyls ===
The Prophets of Israel and the Sibyls of the pagan world foretold the coming of the Messiah. Both have been included by Michelangelo as a sign that the Messiah (Jesus Christ) was to come not just for the Jews but also for the Gentiles (non-Jewish people).

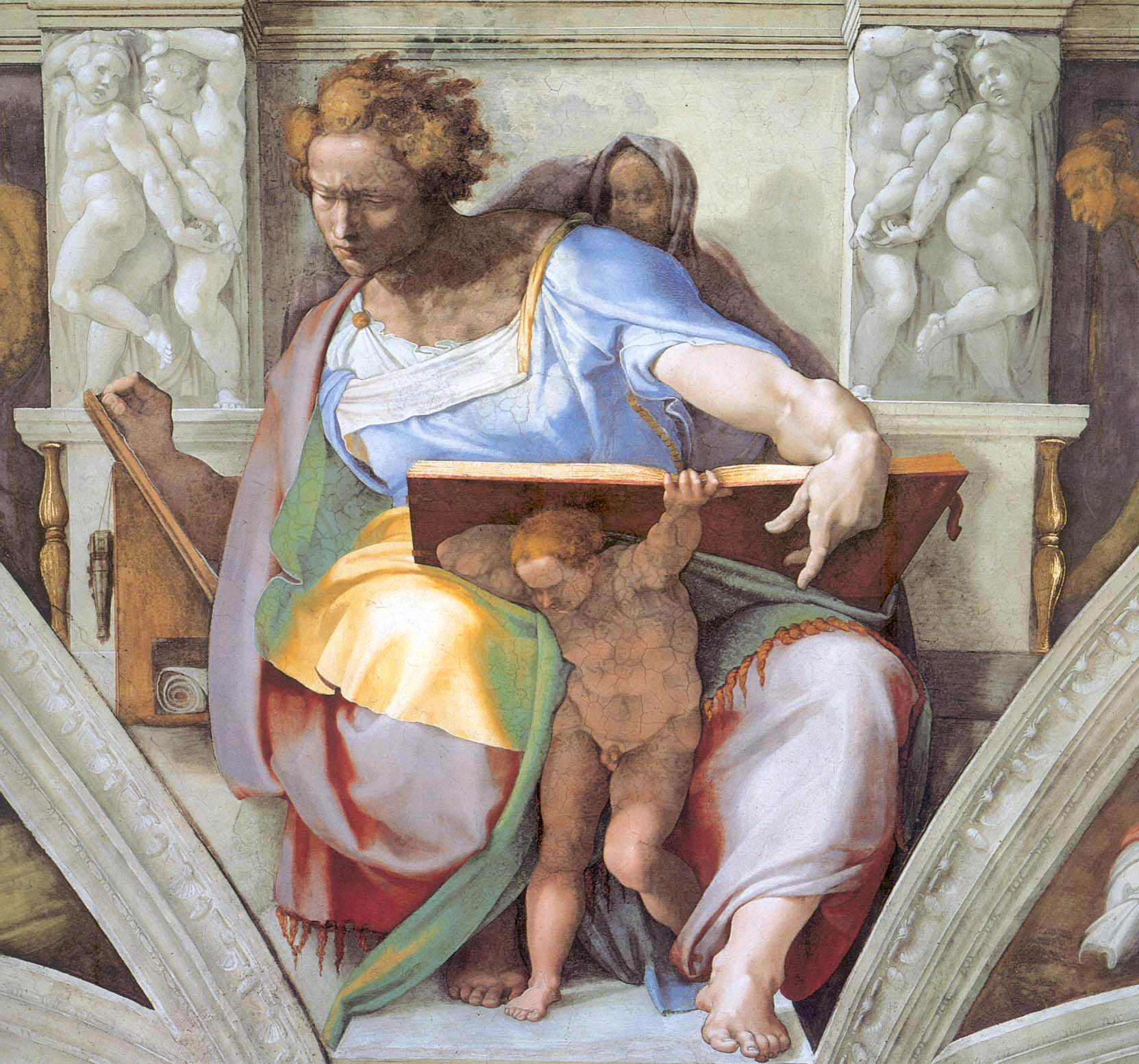
Daniel

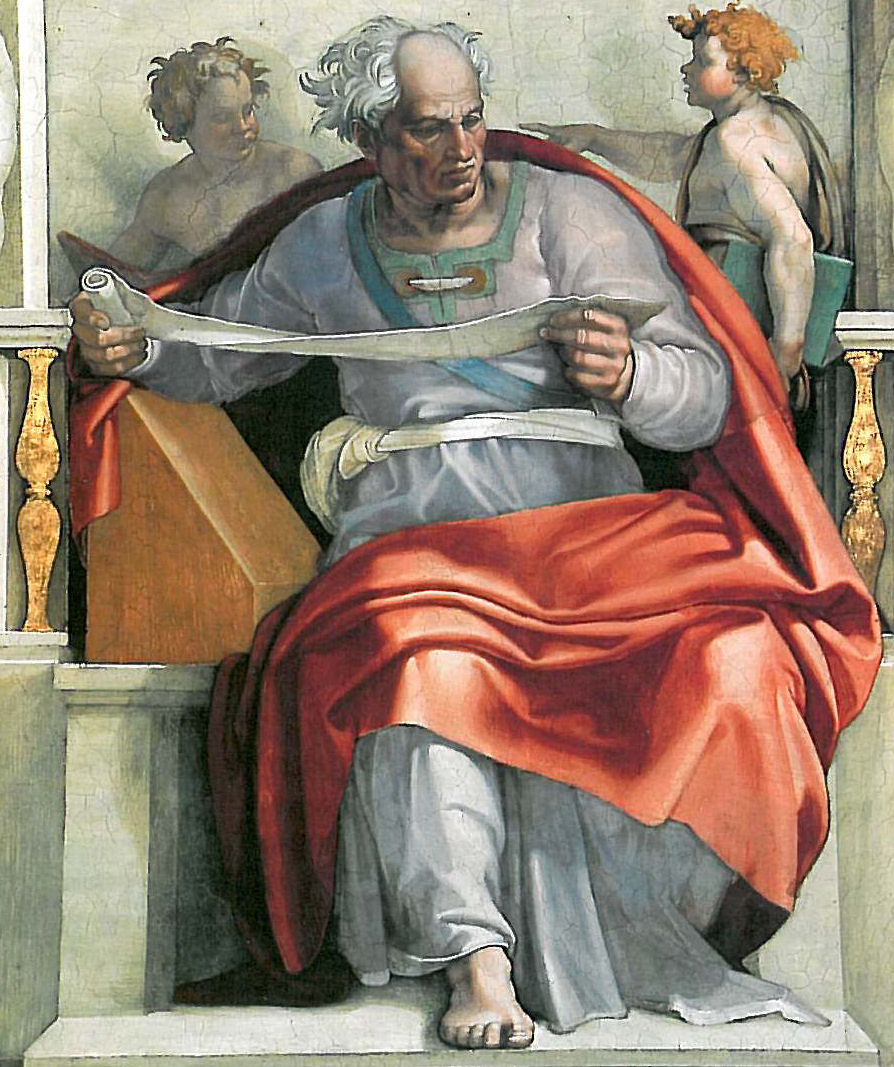
Joel

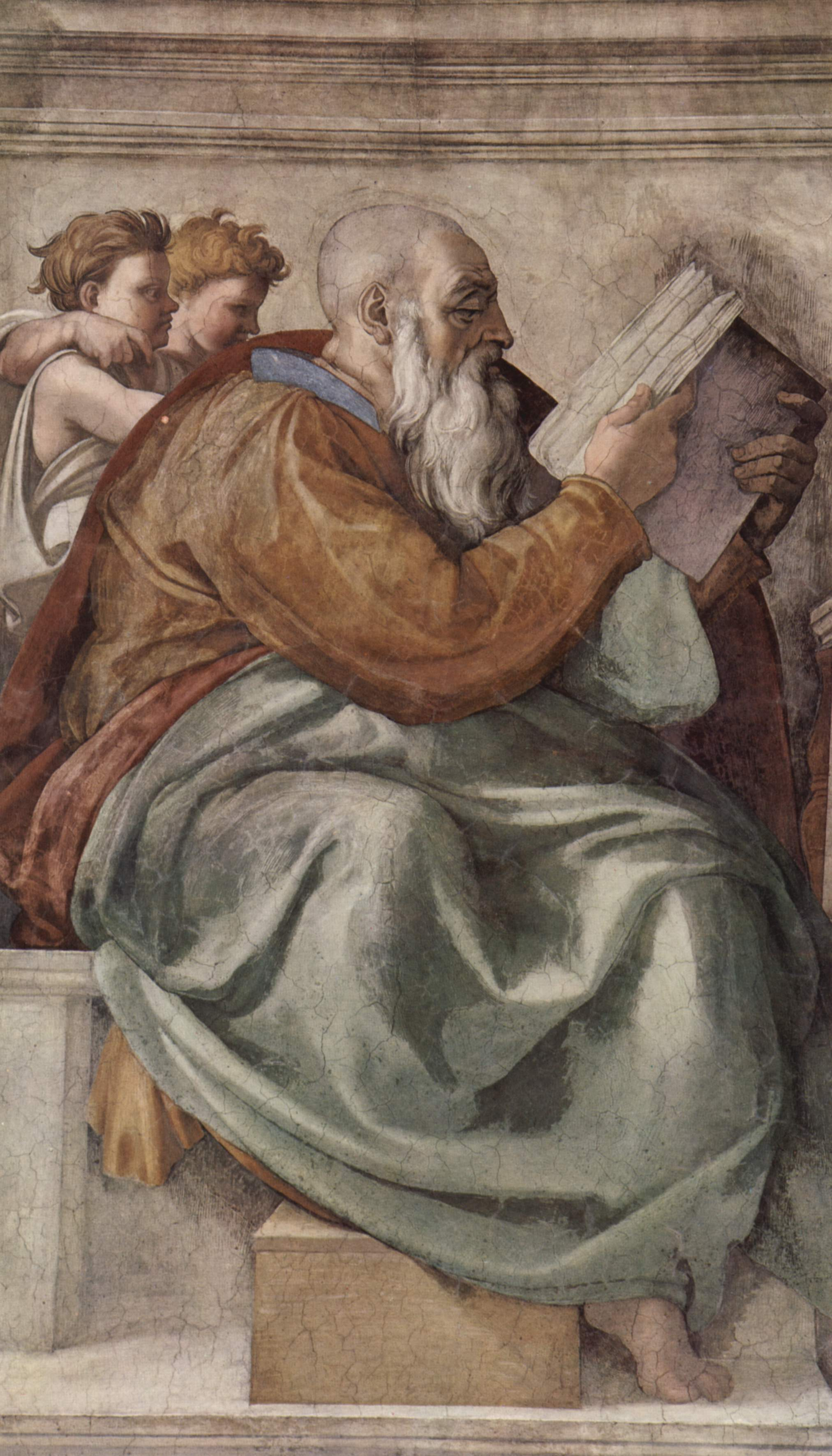
Zechariah

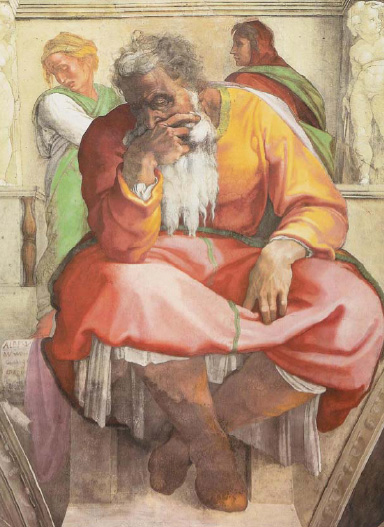
Jeremiah lamenting the fall of Jerusalem

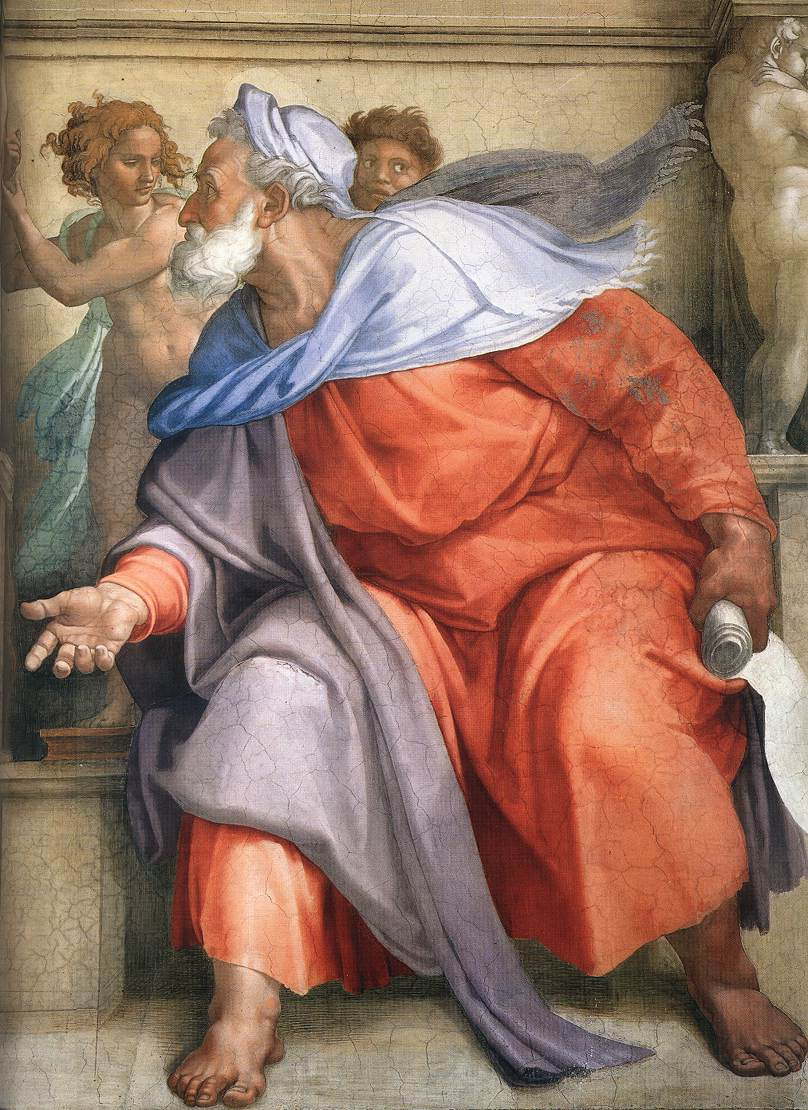
Ezekiel hears the word of the Lord.

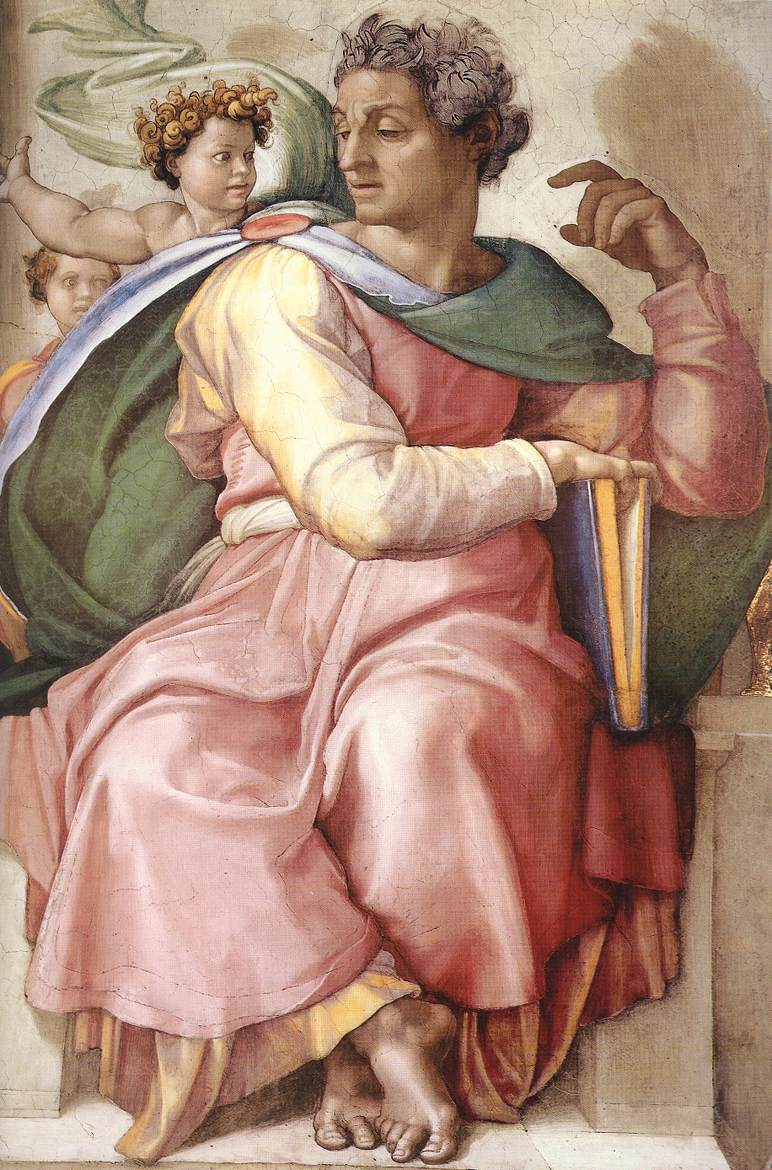
The prophet Isaiah

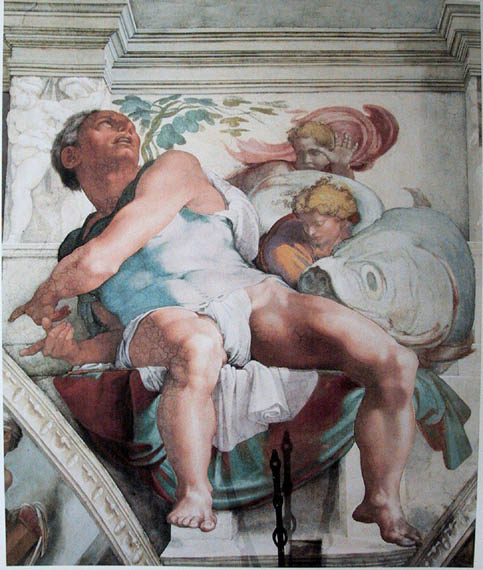
The prophet Jonah

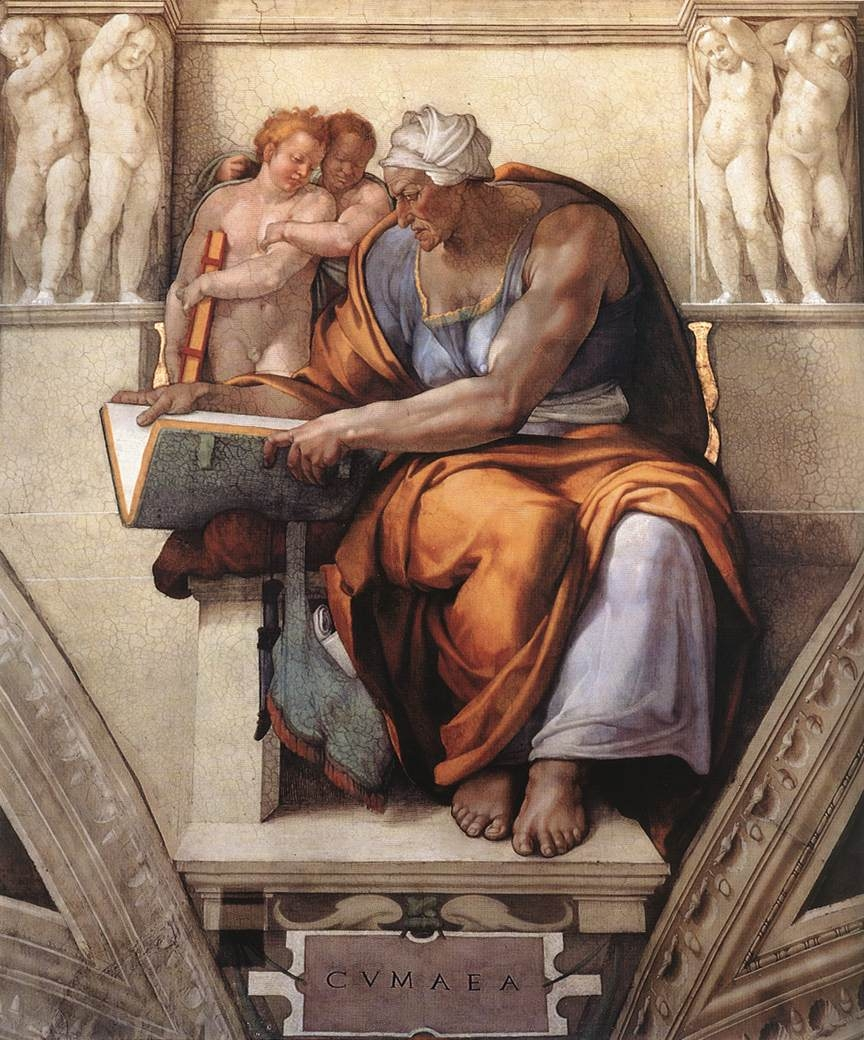
The Cumaean Sibyl

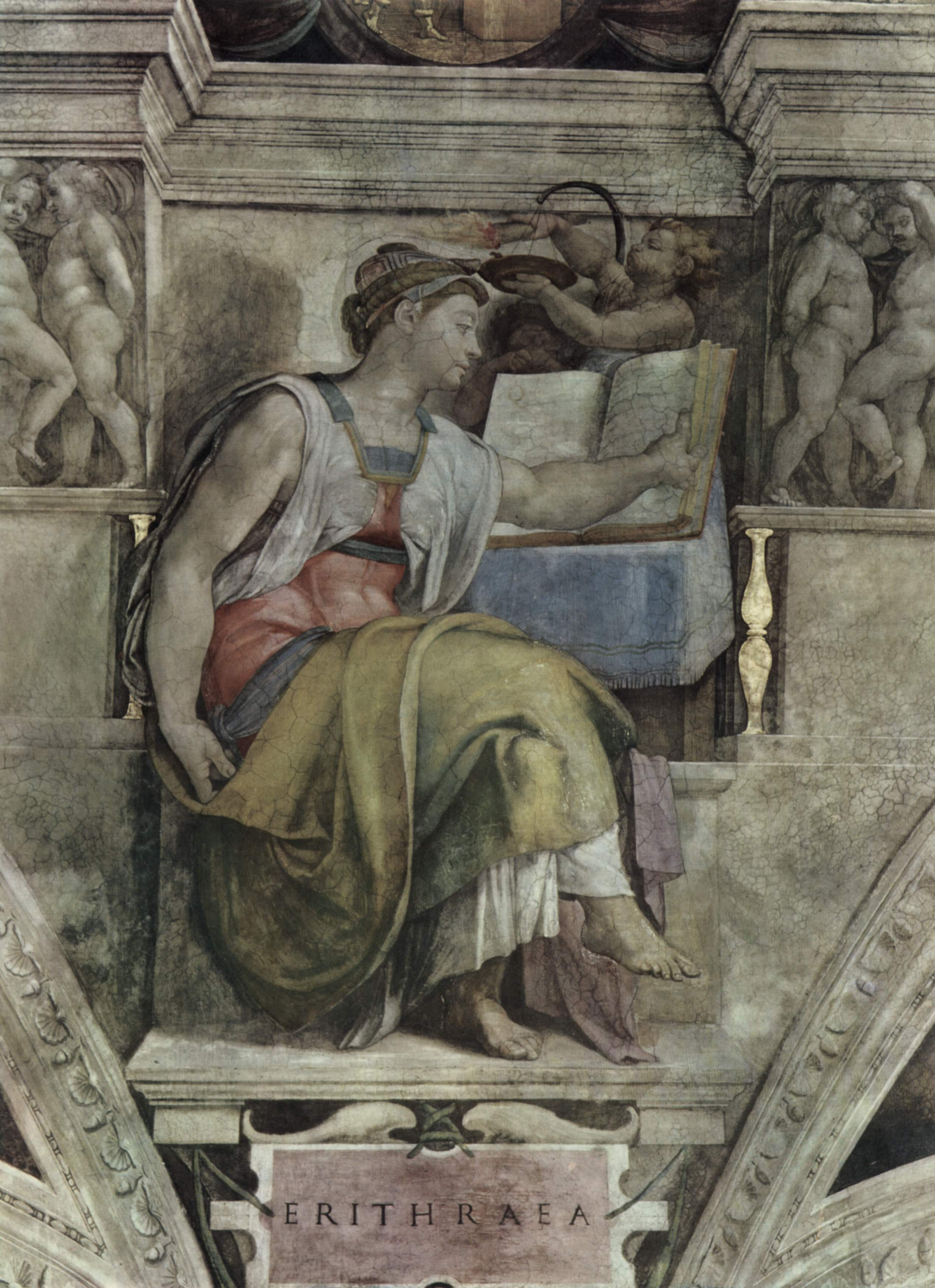
The Erythraean Sibyl

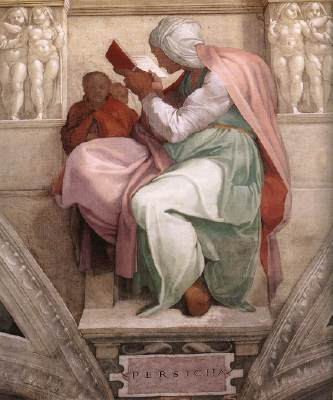
The Persian Sibyl

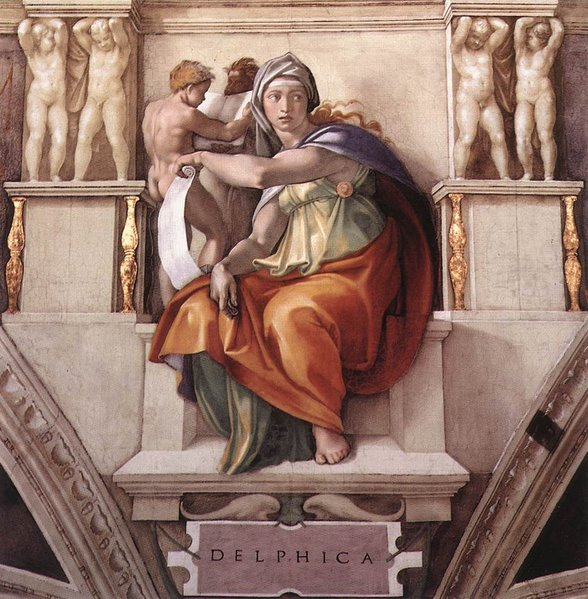
The Delphic Sibyl

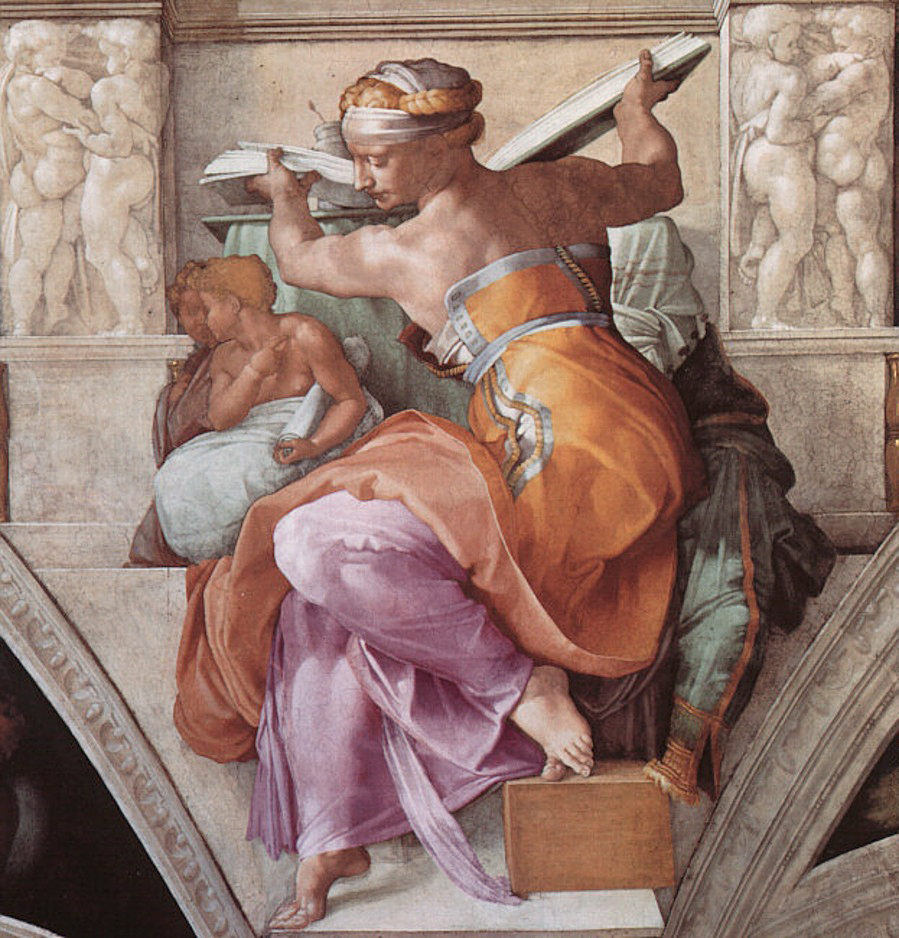
The Libyan Sibyl

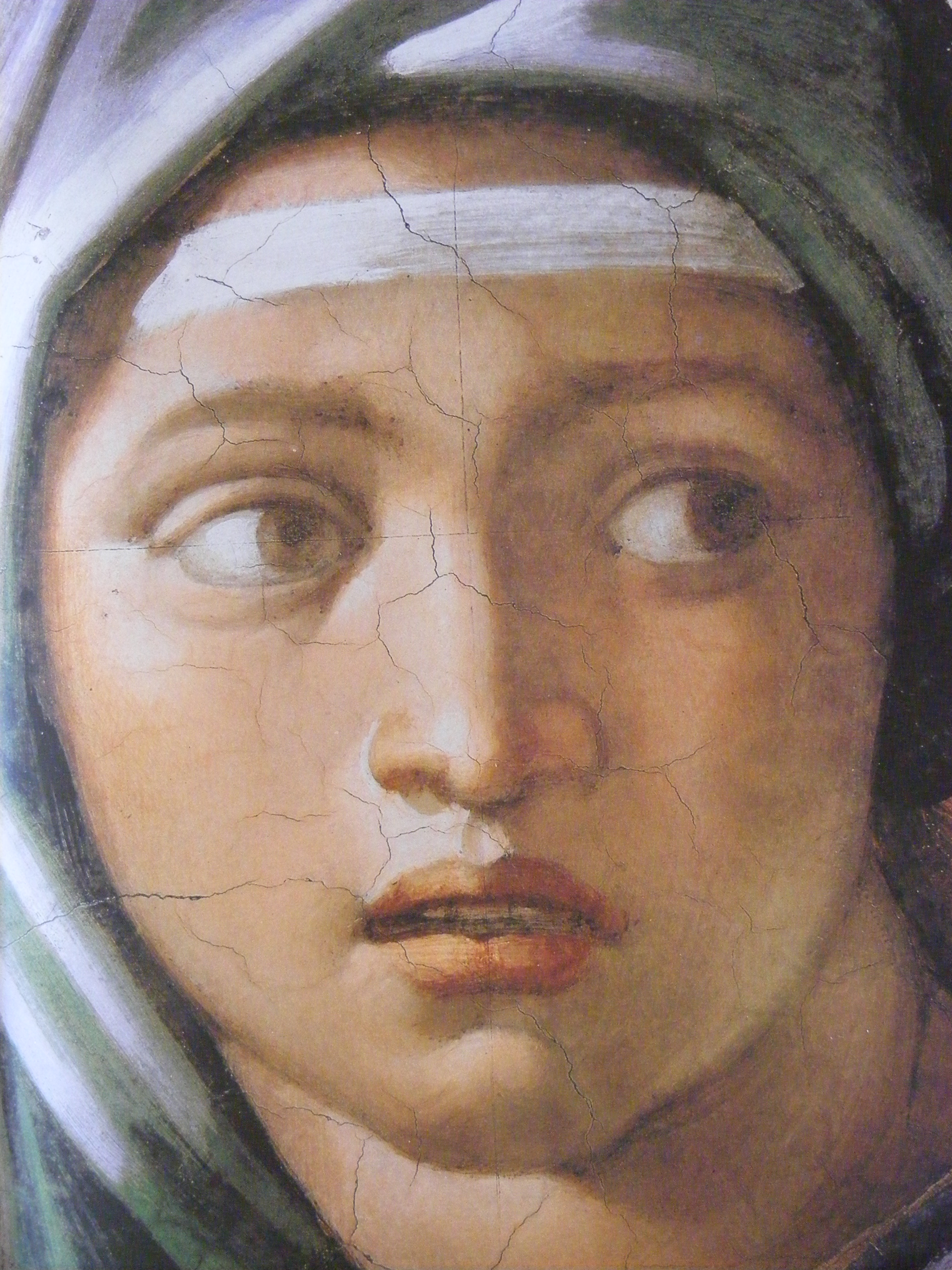
Detail of the Delphic Sibyl

=== Pendentives ===
The four corner pendentives show violent episodes in which the People of Israel were rescued from enemies, or from their own sinful ways.

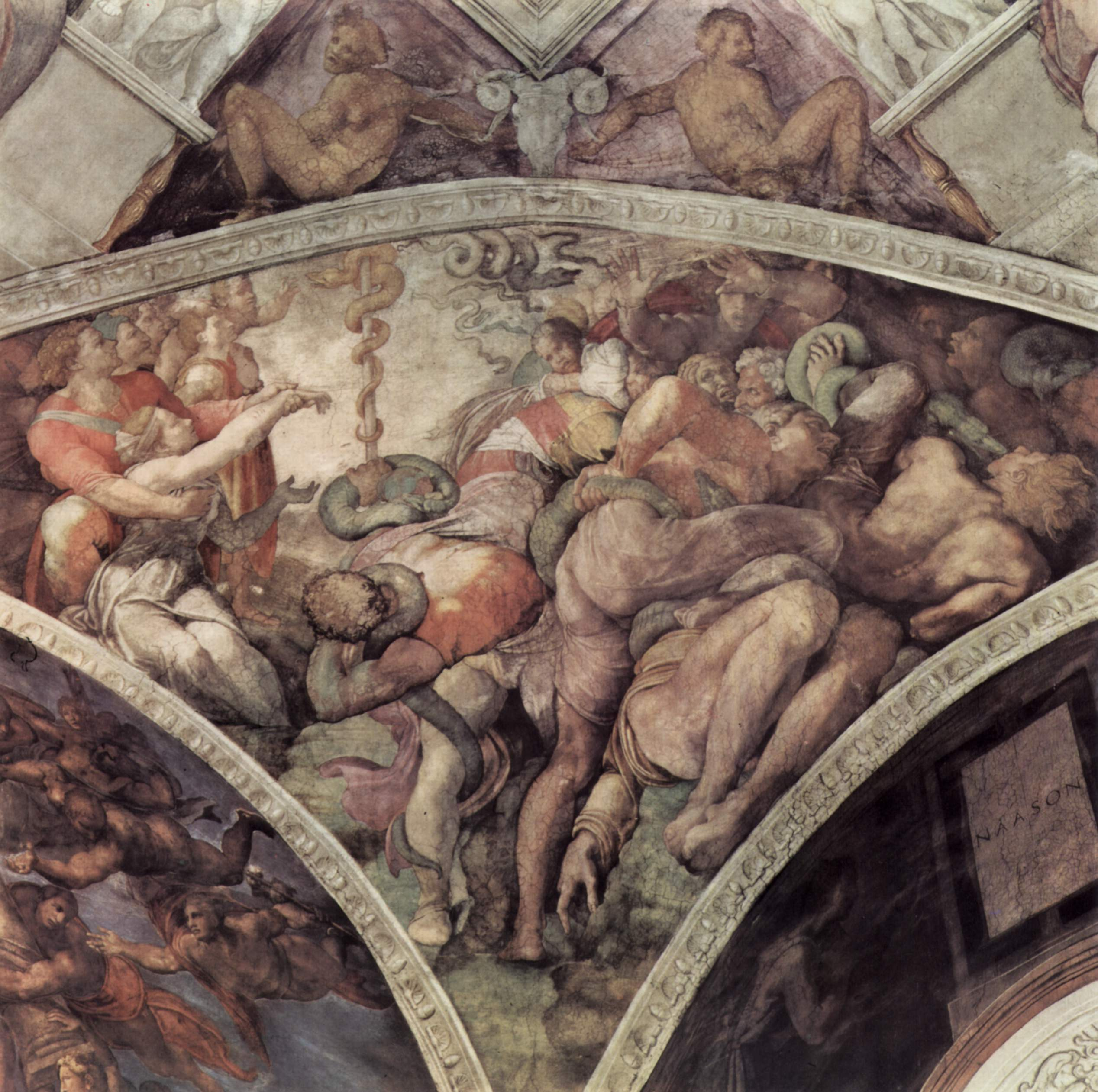
The Brazen serpent

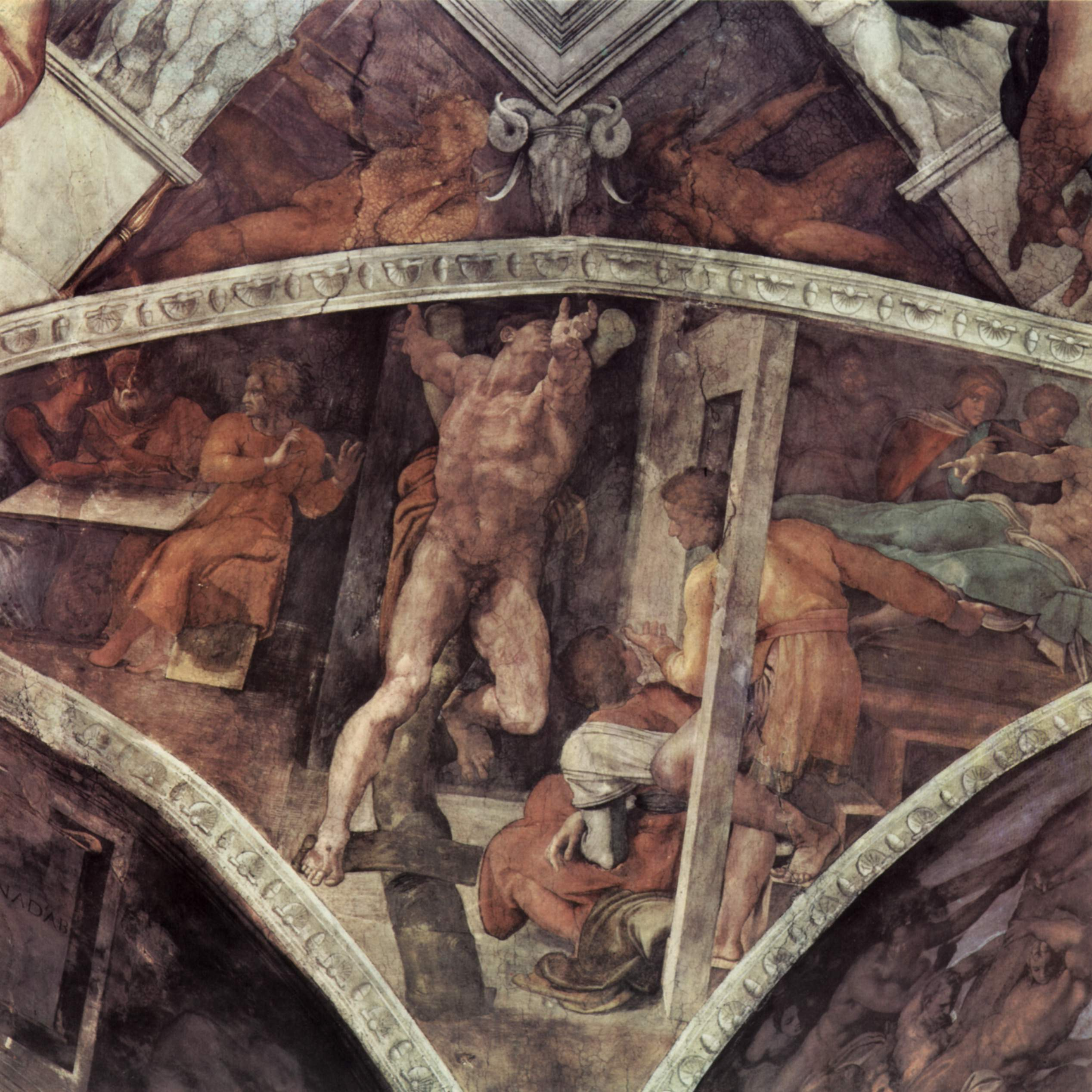
Haman's punishment

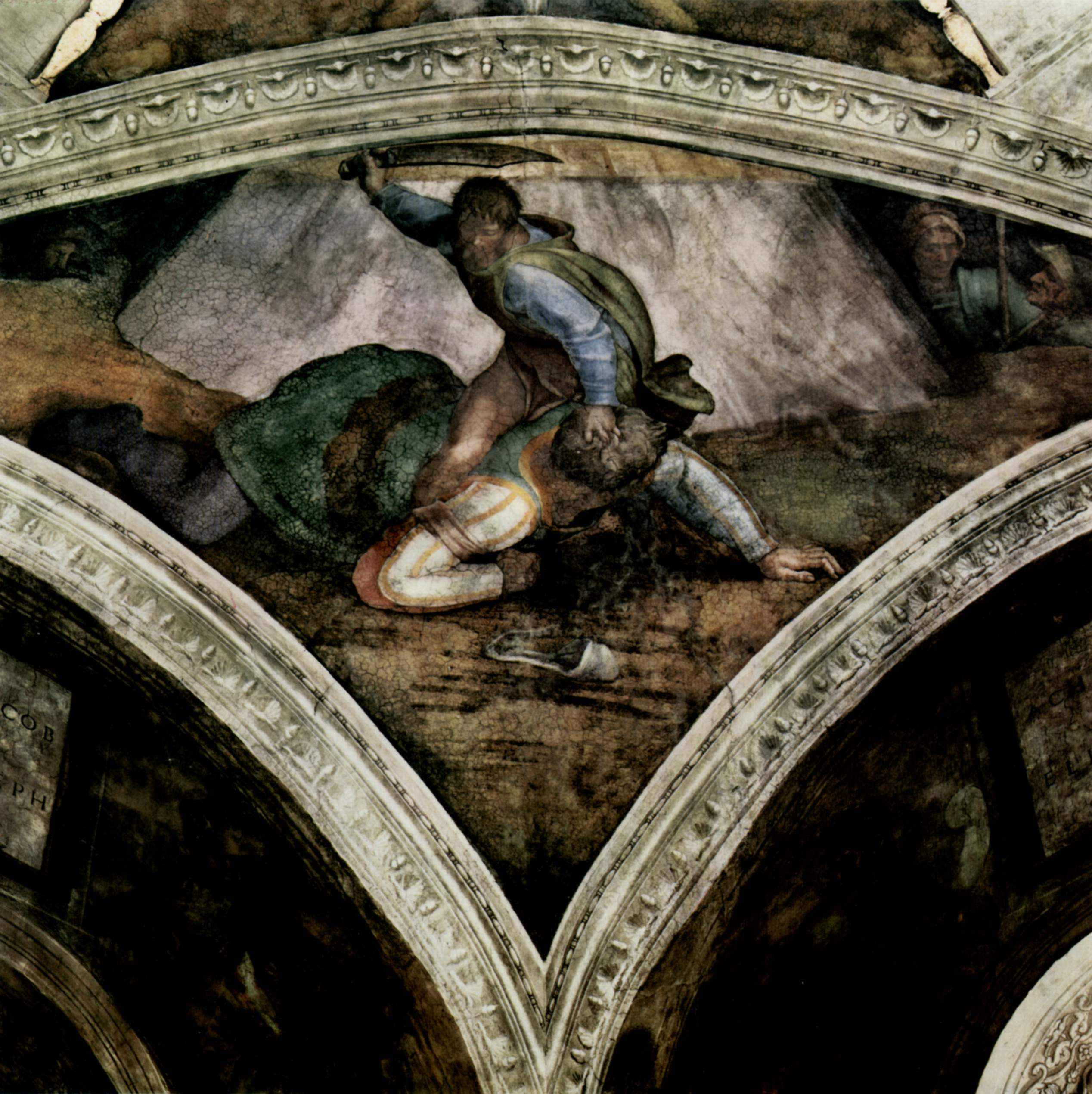
David and Goliath

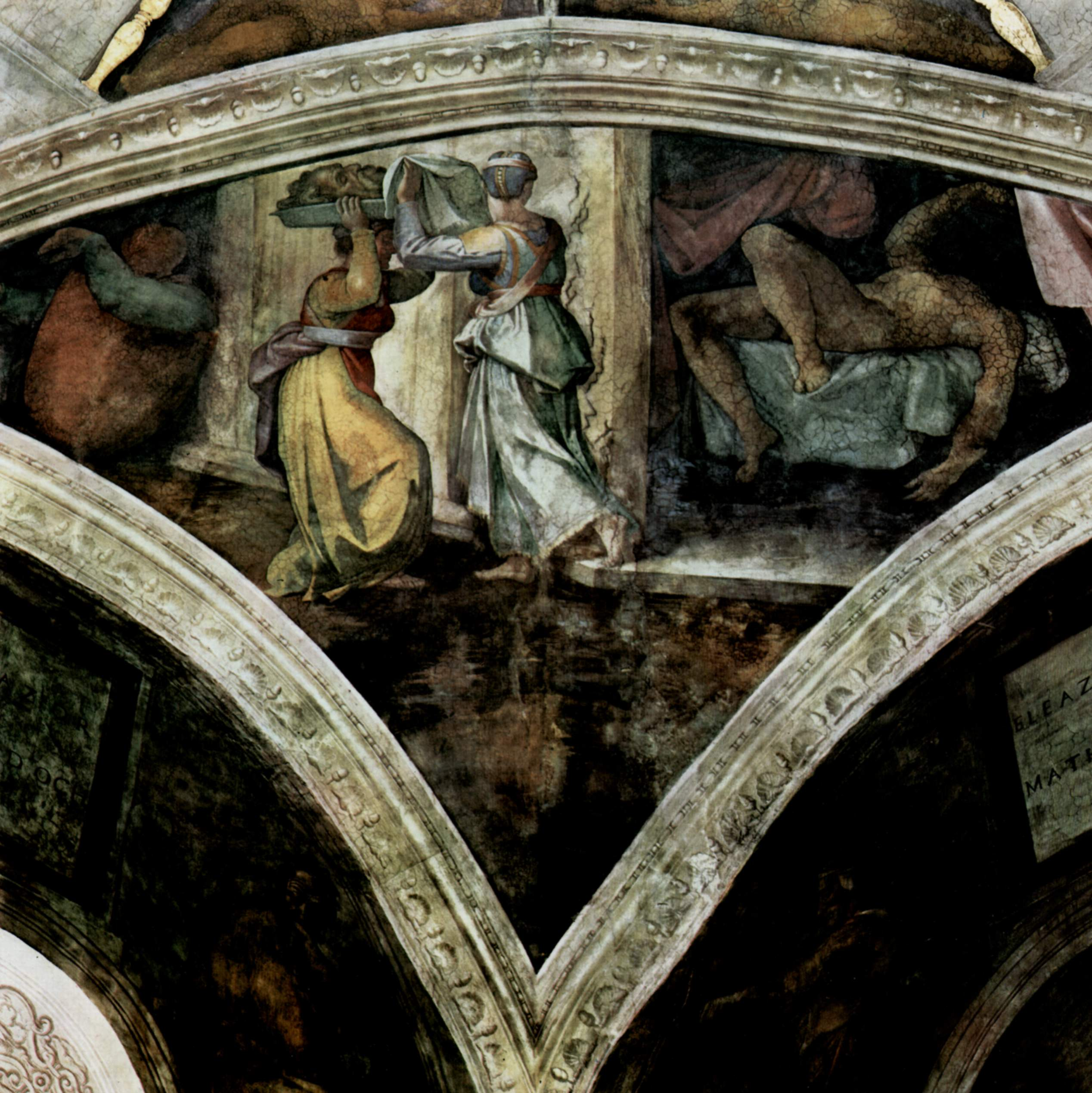
Judith and Holofernes

=== Ancestors ===
The ancestors of Jesus are listed in the Biblical books of Matthew and Luke. This is the first known large painted series, although they were often shown in stained glass. See Tree of Jesse. Although each picture has a title, the characters cannot be positively identified.

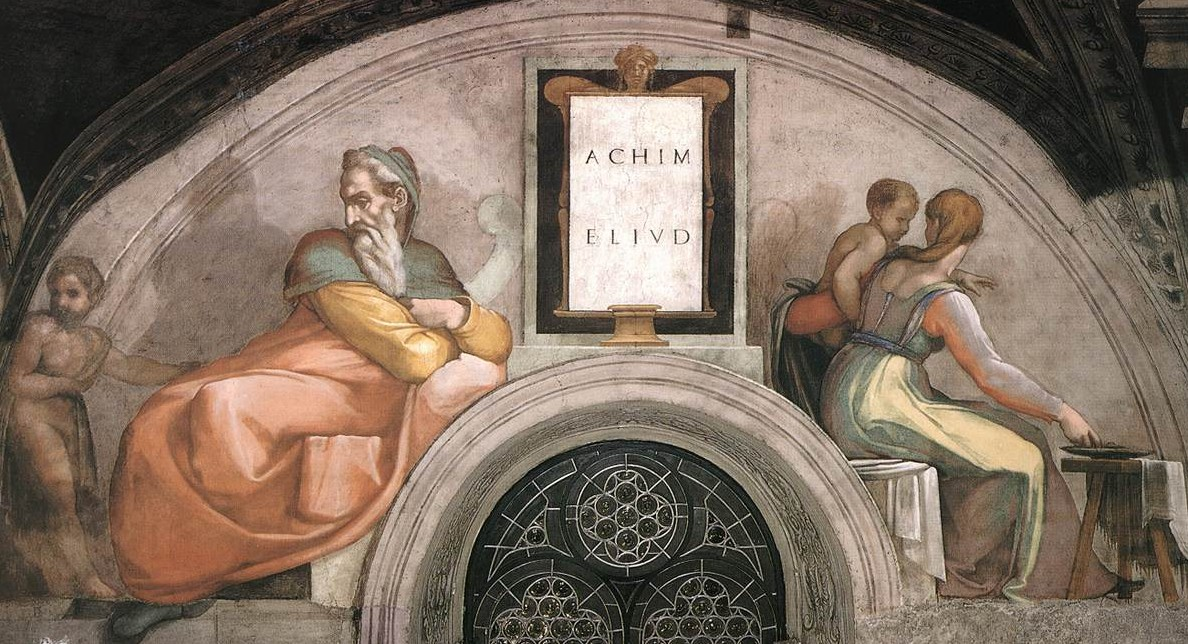
Achim / Eliud

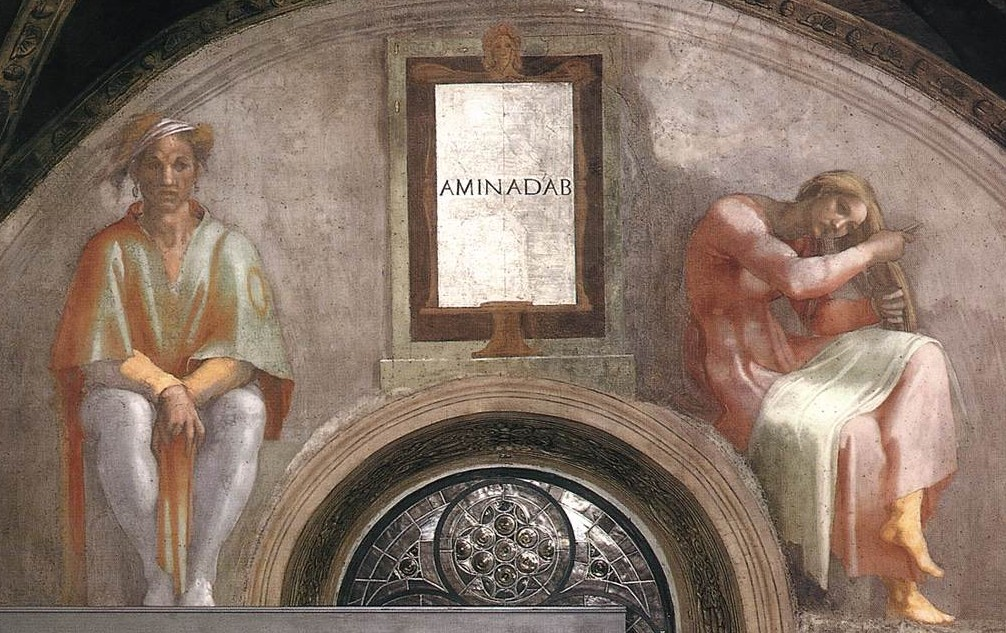
Aminadab

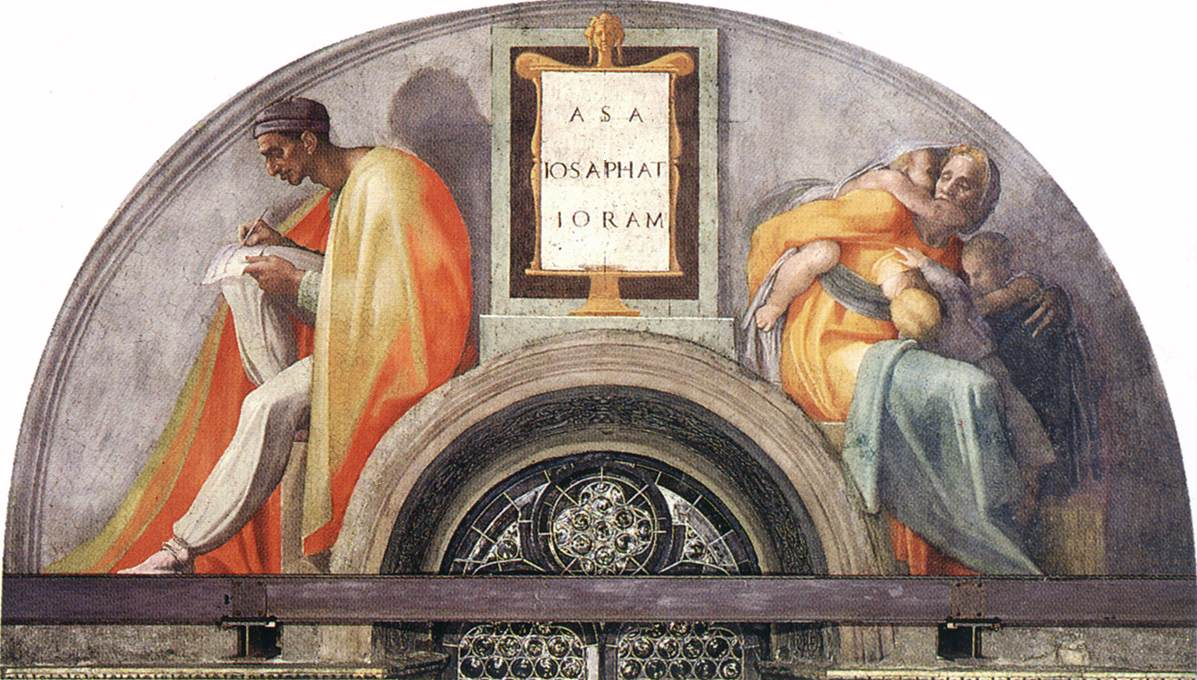
Asa / Jehosaphat / Joram

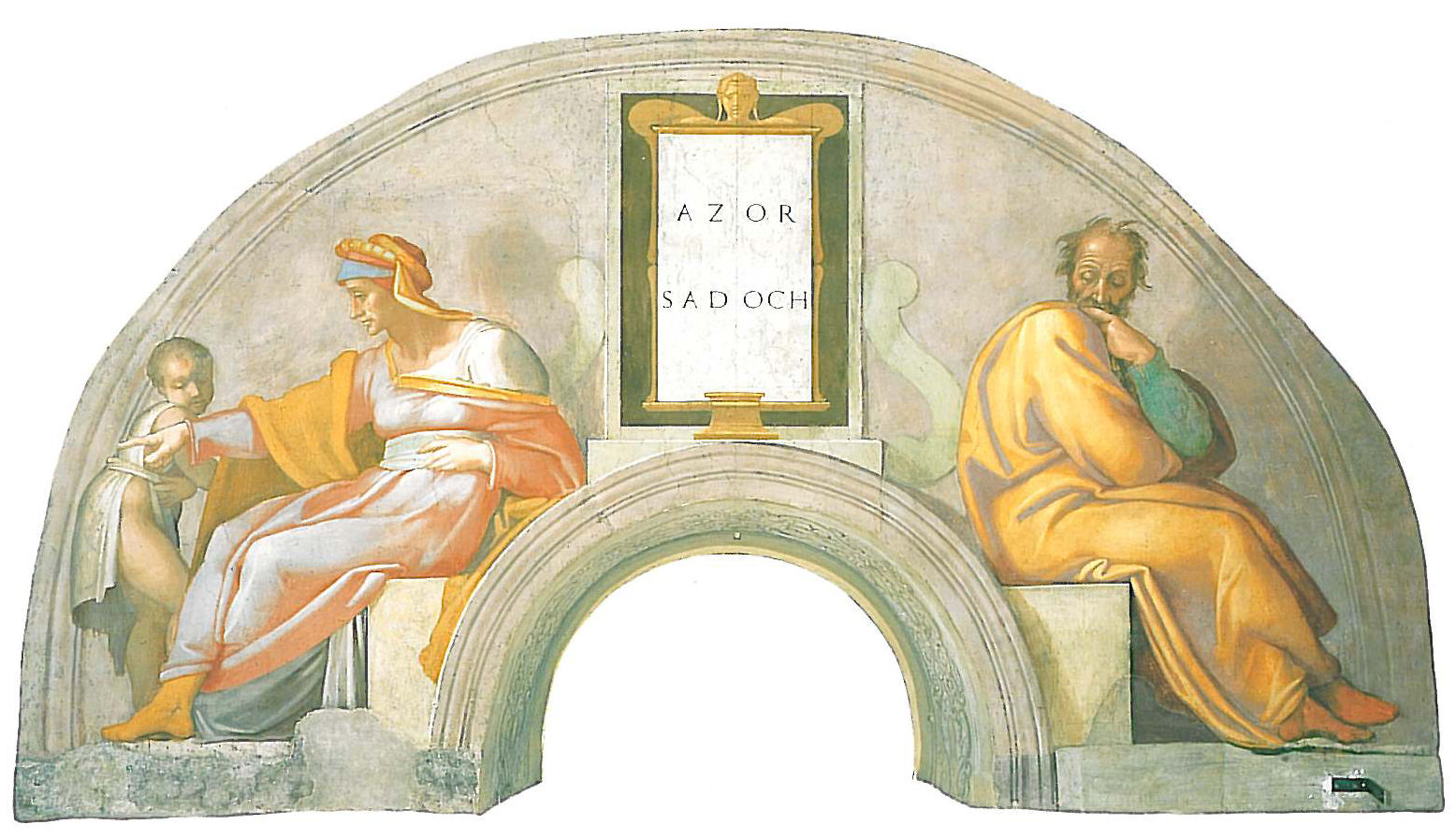
Azor / Sadoch

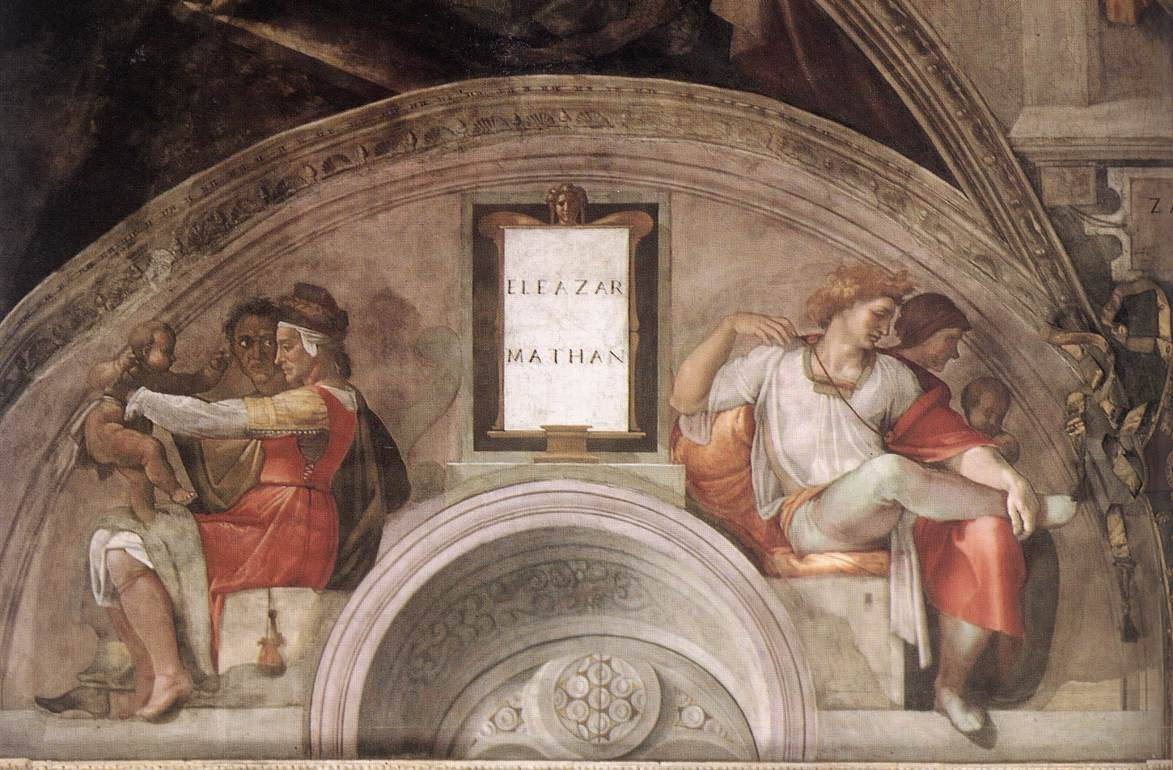
Eleazar / Mathan

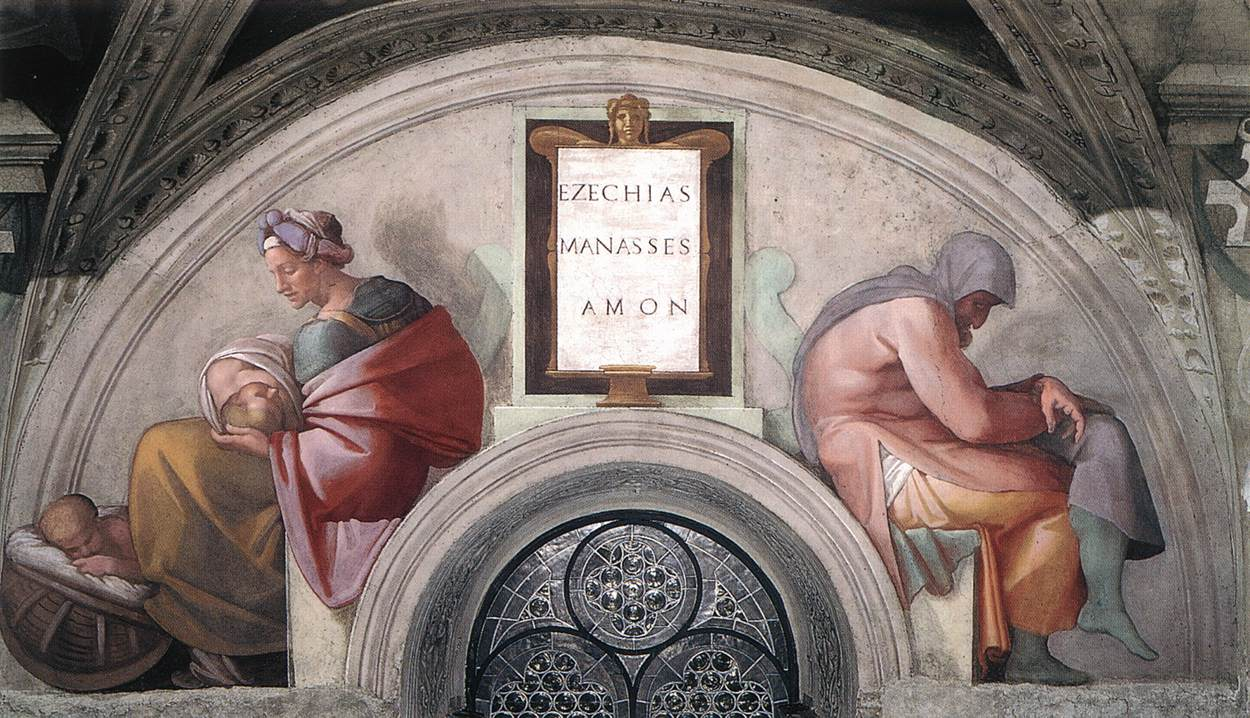
Hezekiah / Manasseh / Amon

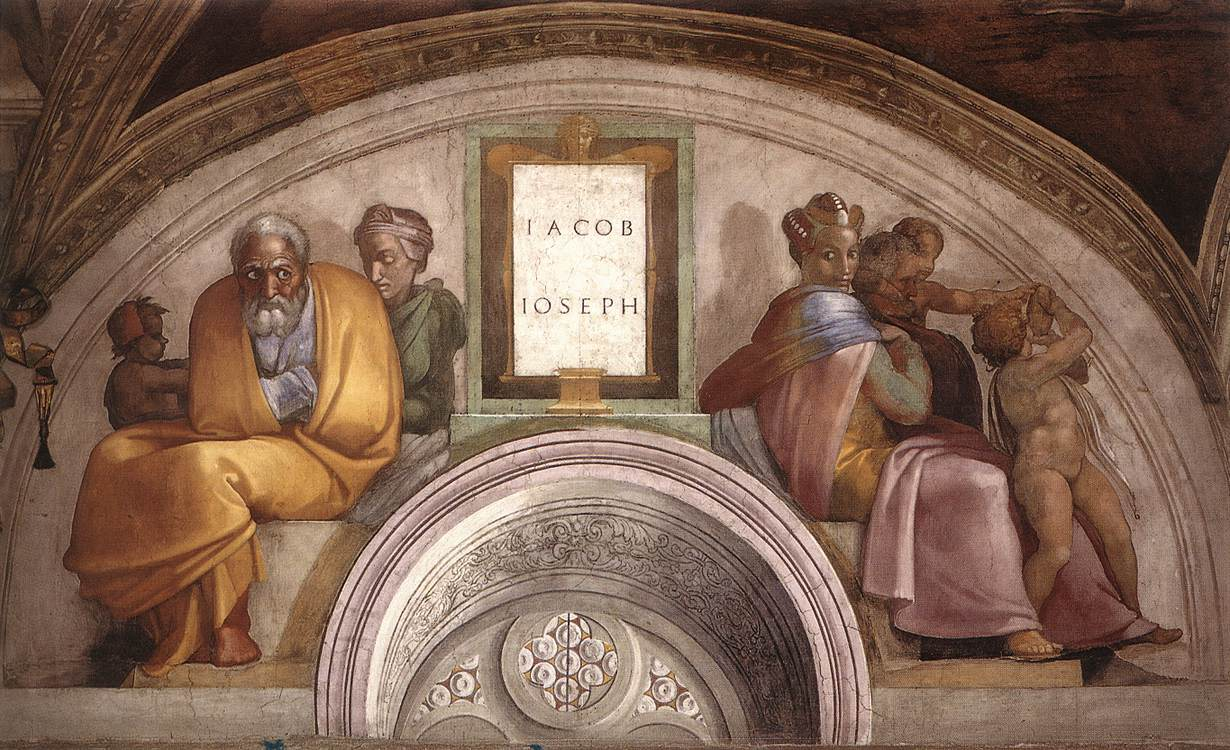
Jacob / Joseph

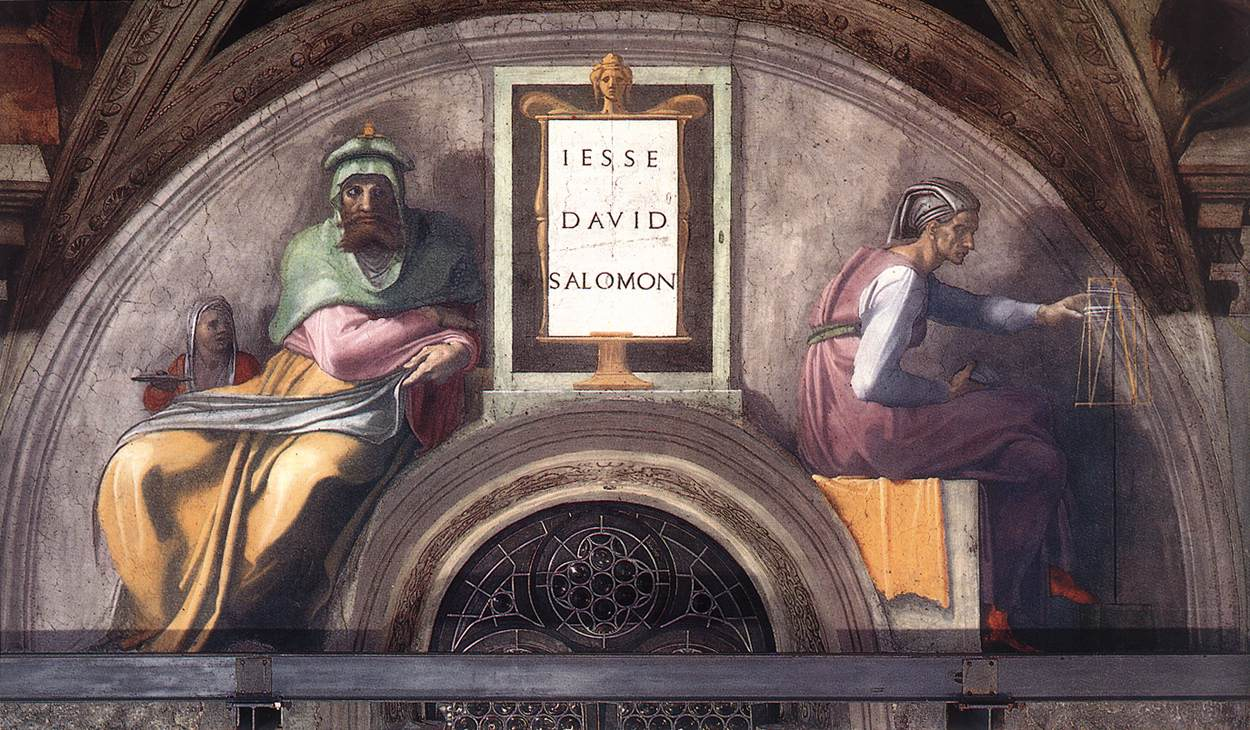
Jesse / David / Solomon

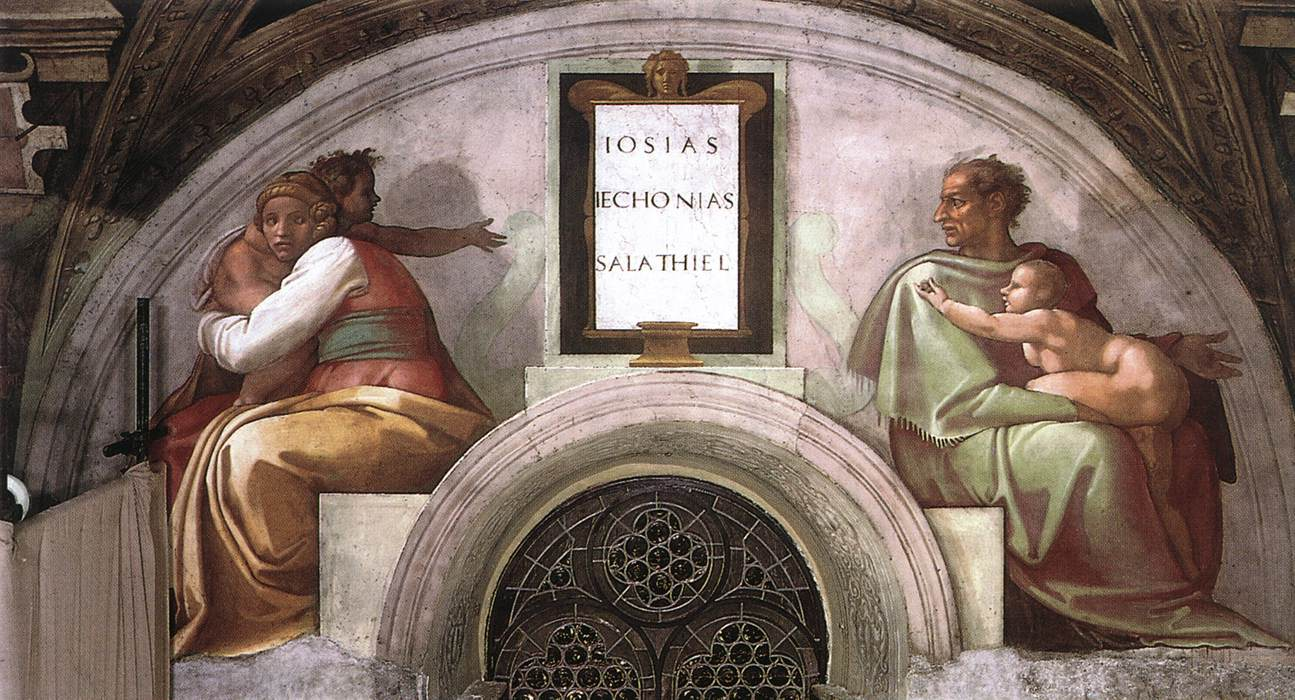
Josiah / Jechoniah / Sheatiel

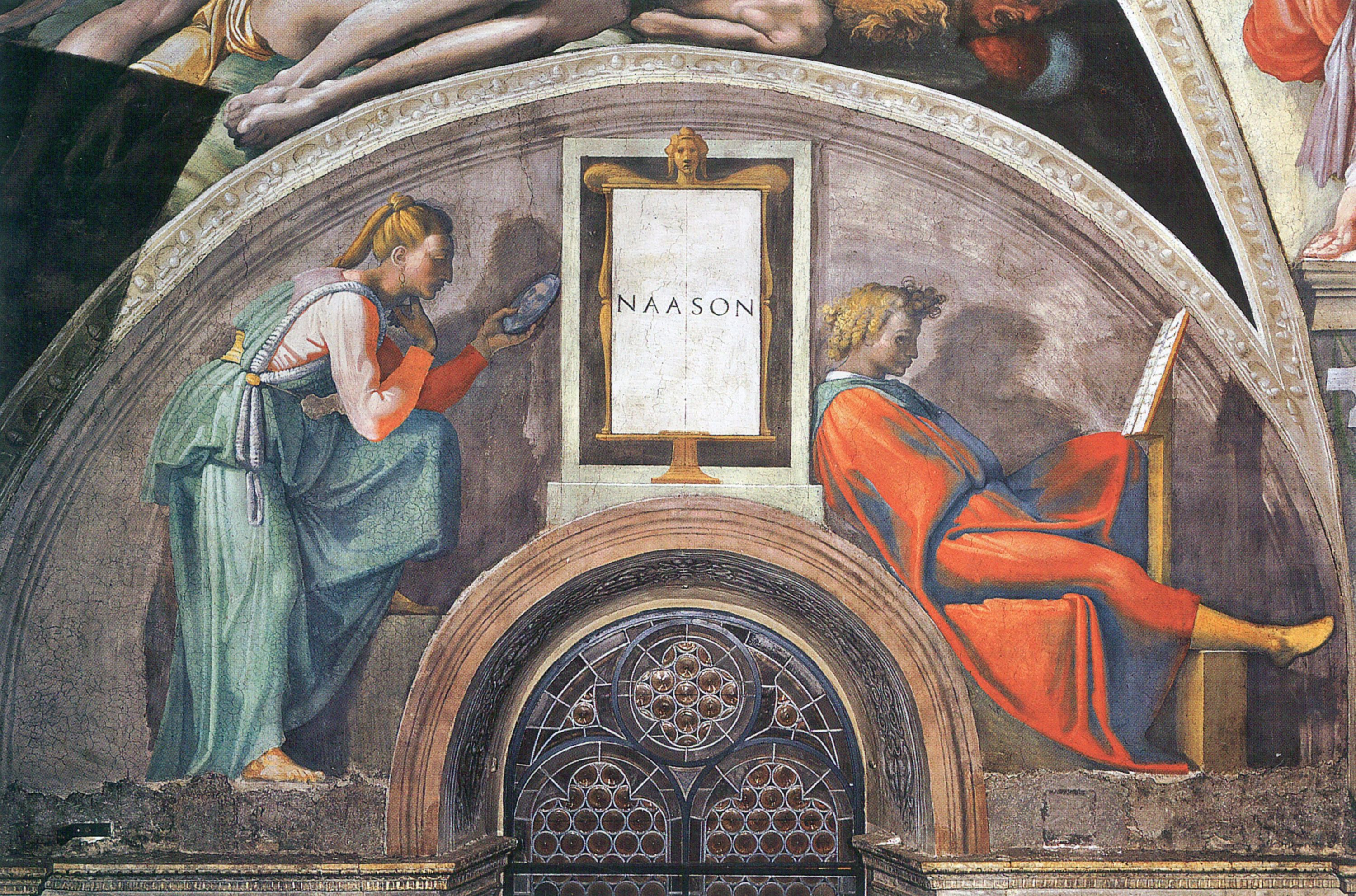
Naason

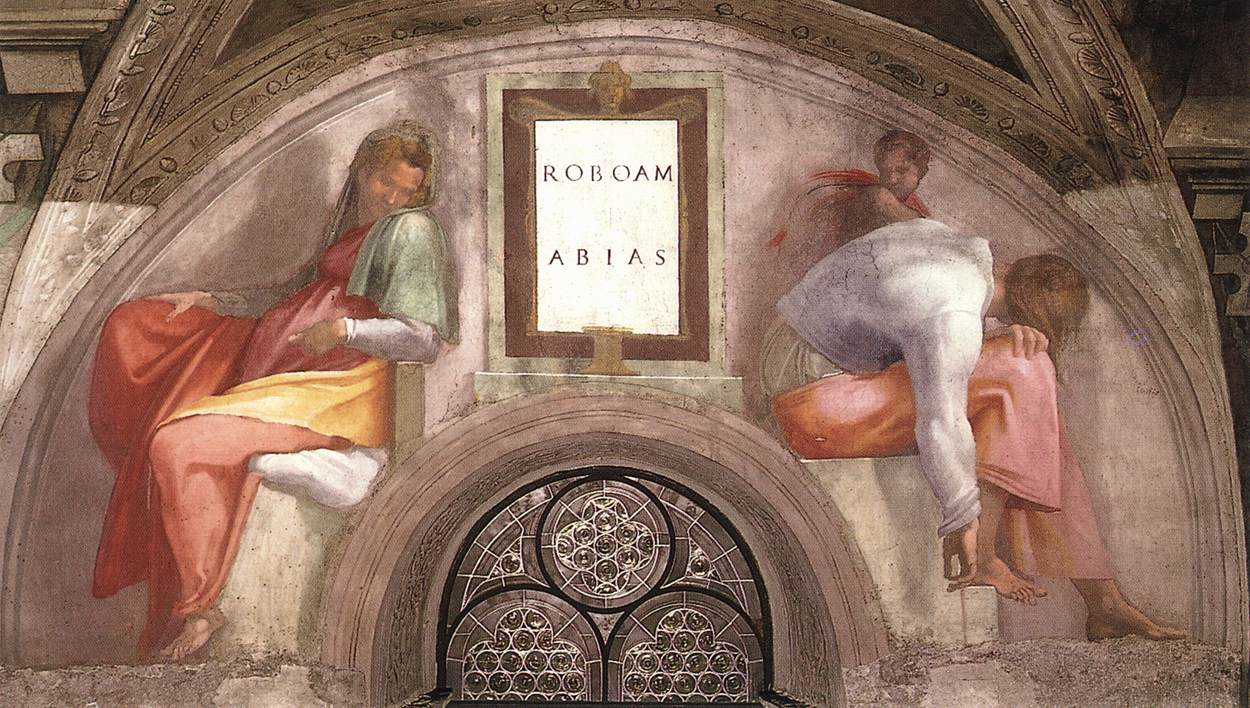
Rehoboam / Abijah

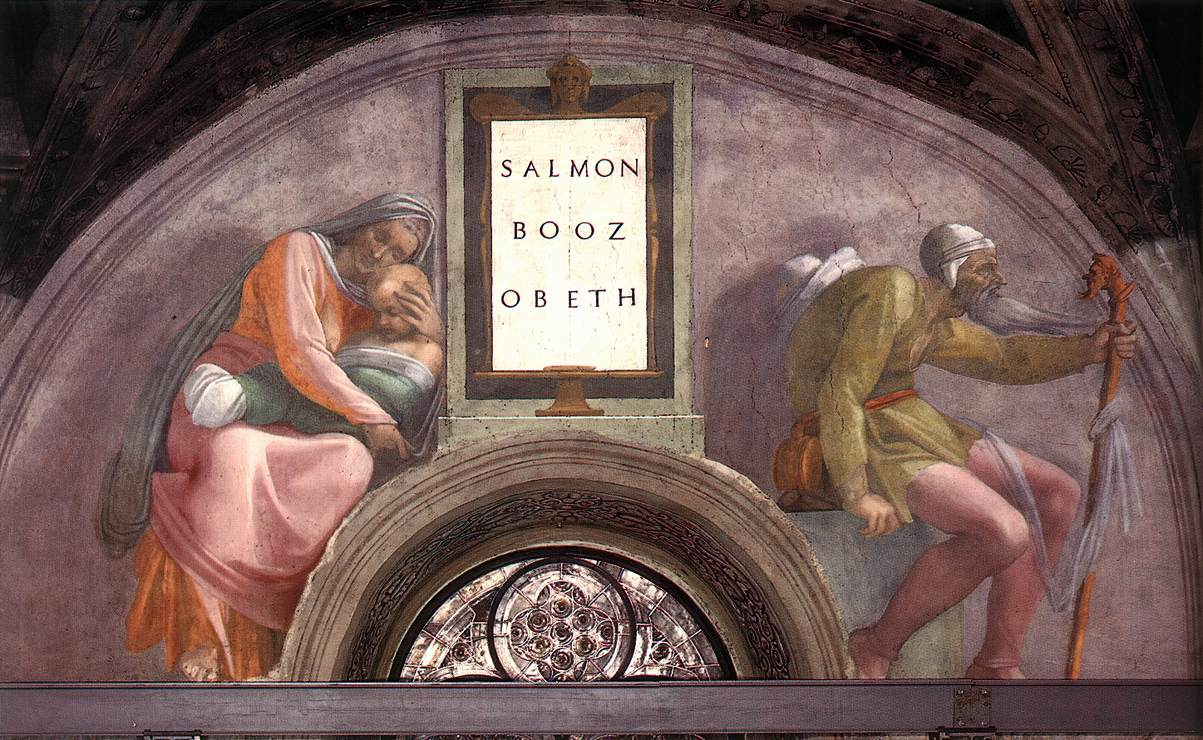
Salmon / Boaz / Obed

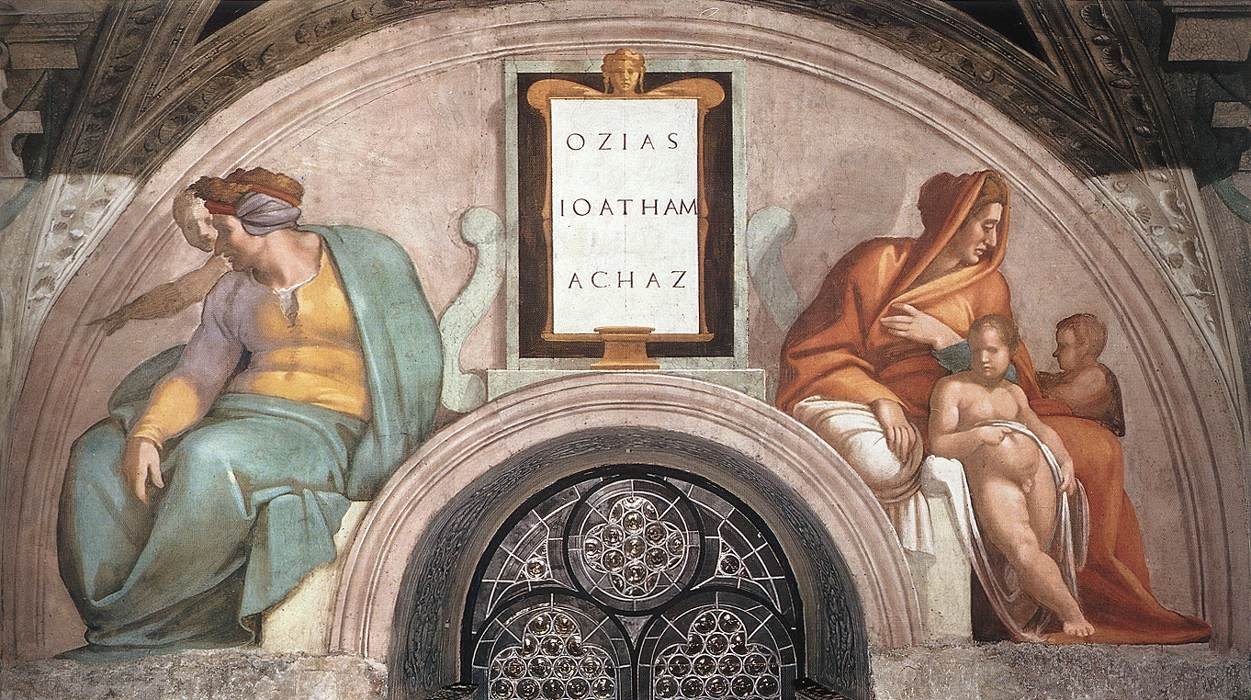
Uzziah / Jotham / Ahaz

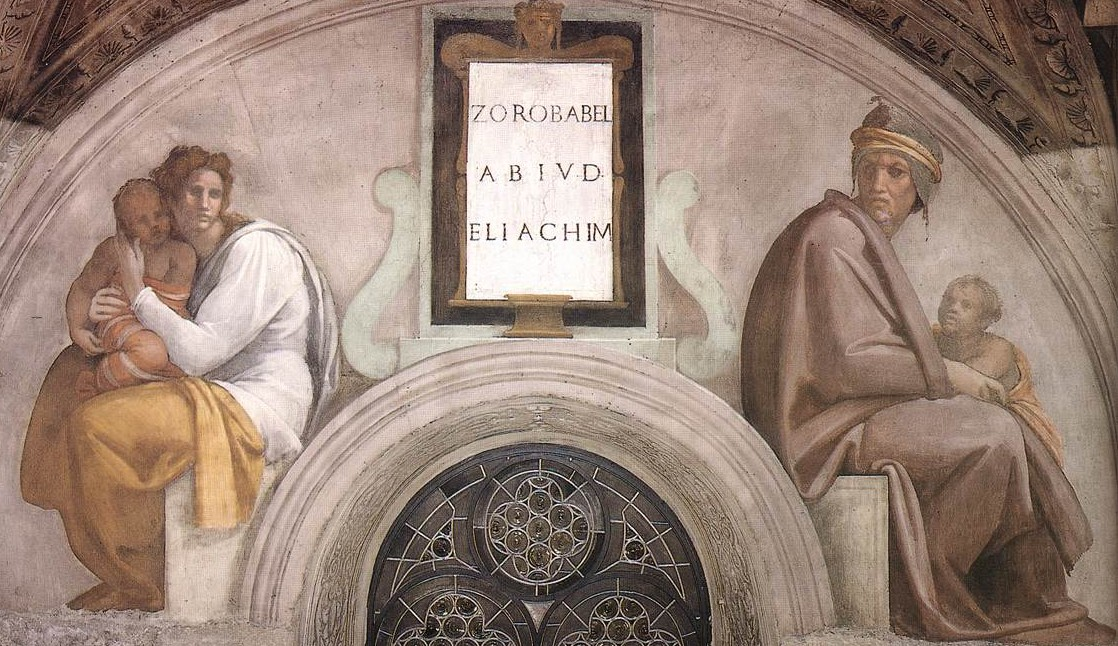
Zerubbabel / Abiud / Eliakim

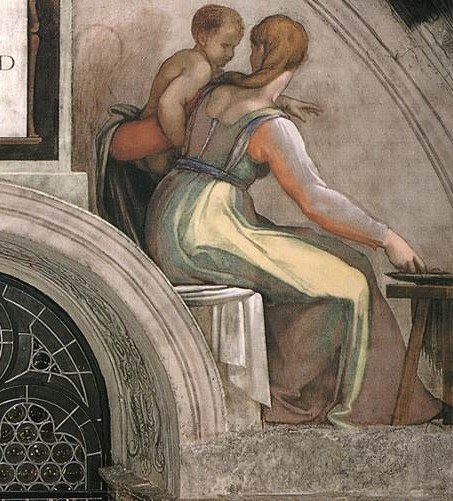
Detail of the Achim lunette

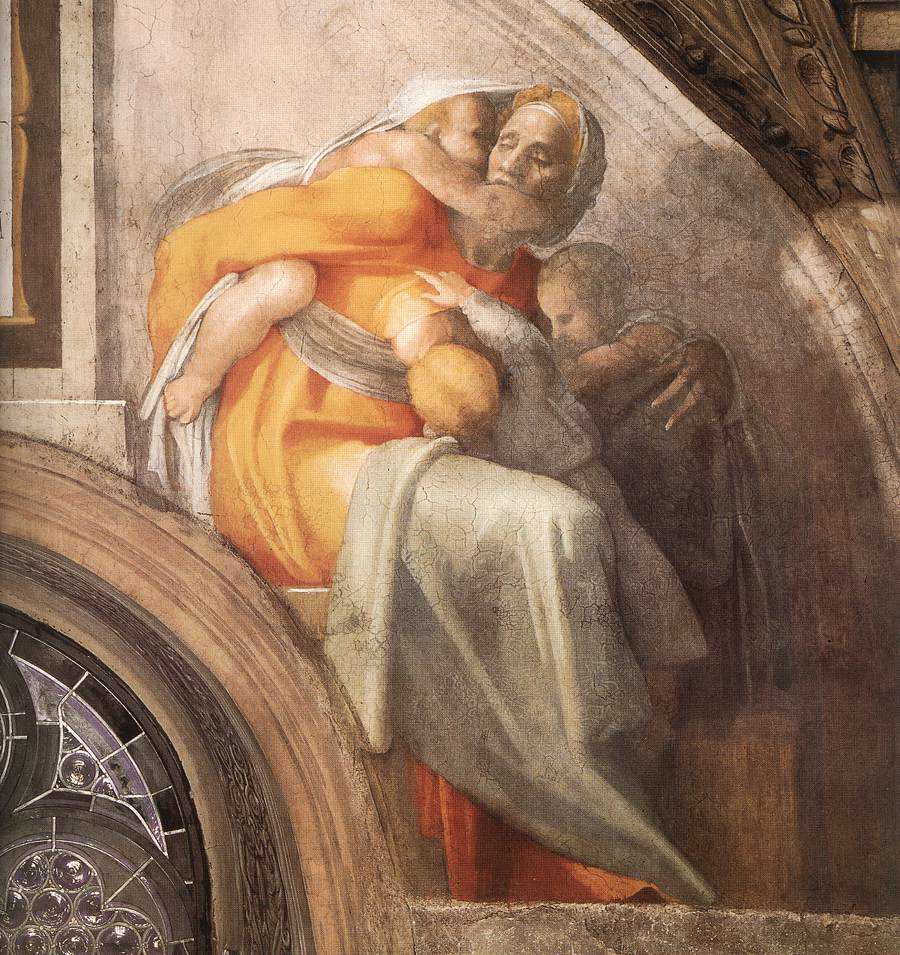
Detail of the Asa, Jehosaphat and Joram lunette

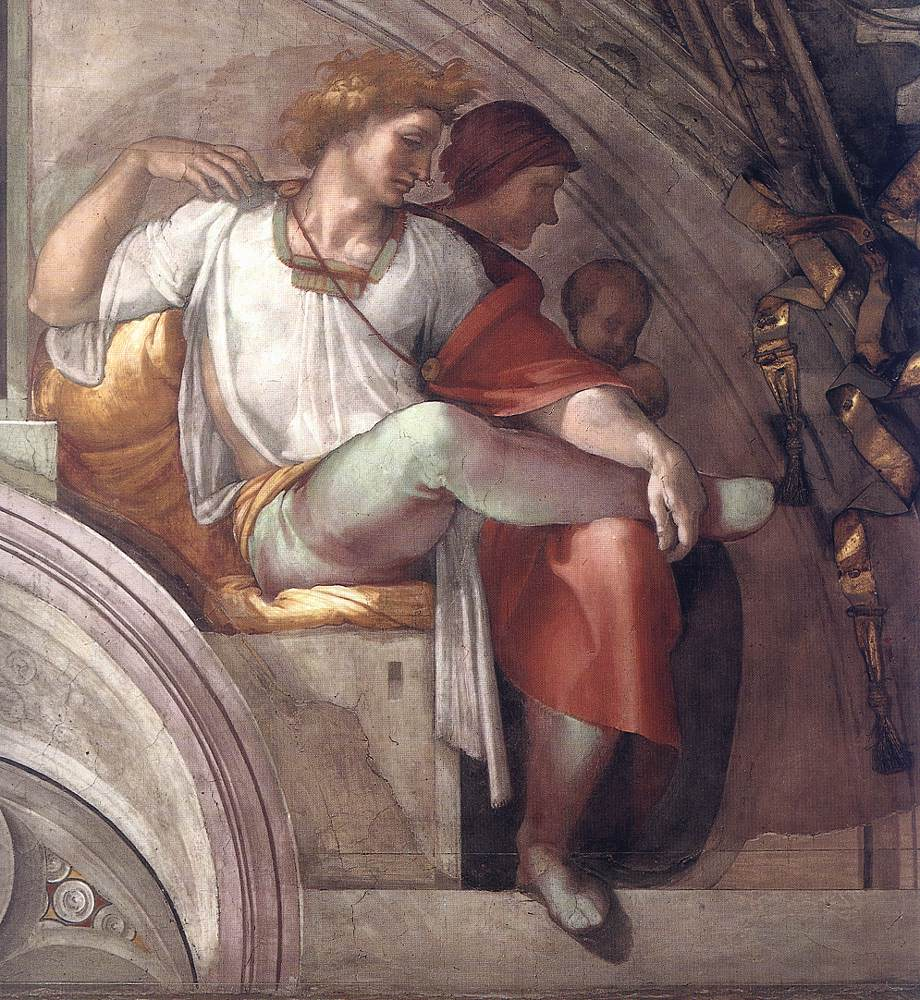
Detail from the Eleazar lunette

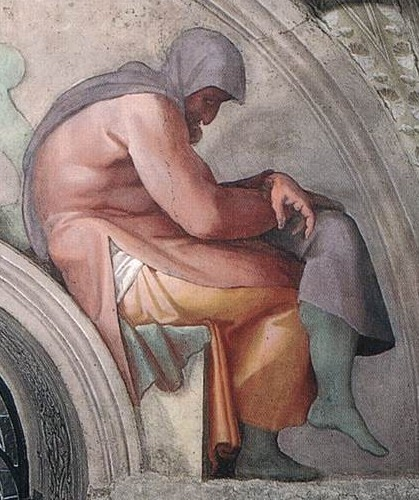
Detail of the Ezechias lunette

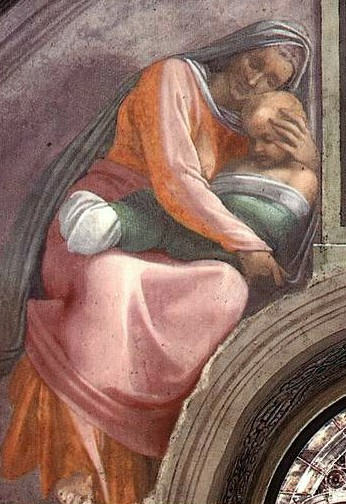
Detail of the Salmon lunette

=== Spandrels ===
Above the windows are a series of families with young children. The children may represent particular children who are mentioned in the Bible, such as Isaac and Samuel. The composition of many of the pictures is similar to that found in depictions of the Holy Family resting on the Flight into Egypt.

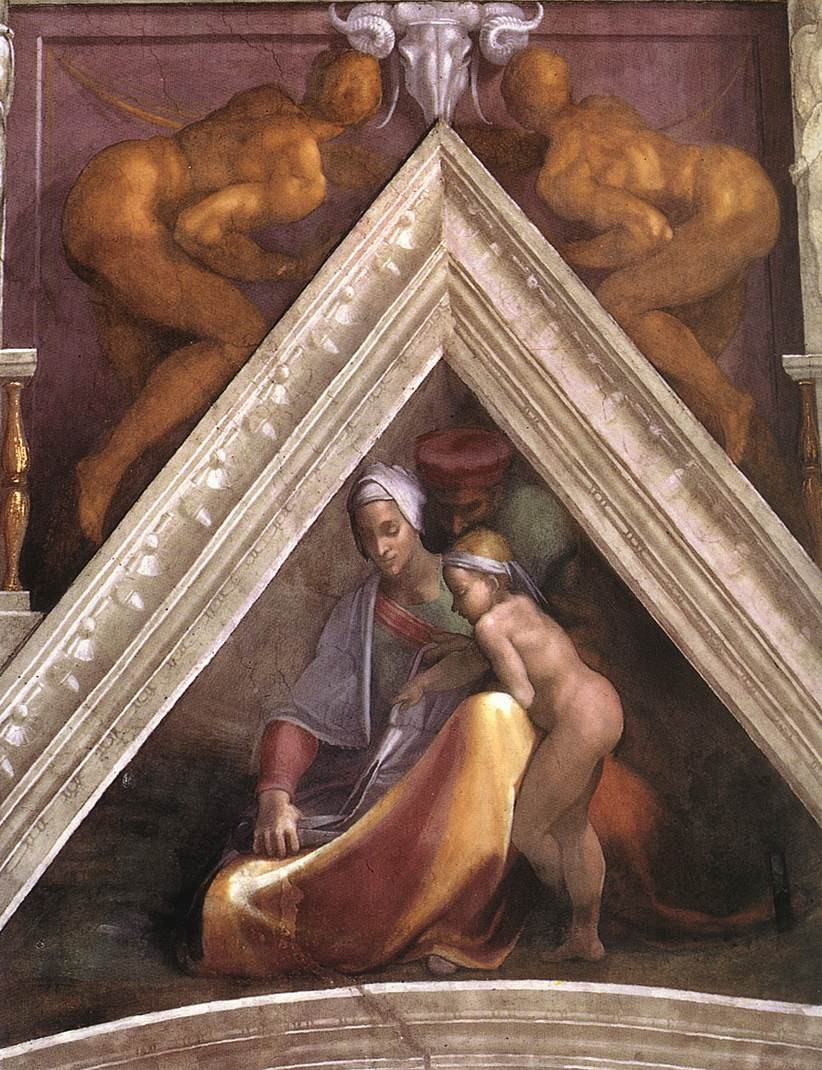
In the Salmon spandrel a woman is making a garment while her child looks on.

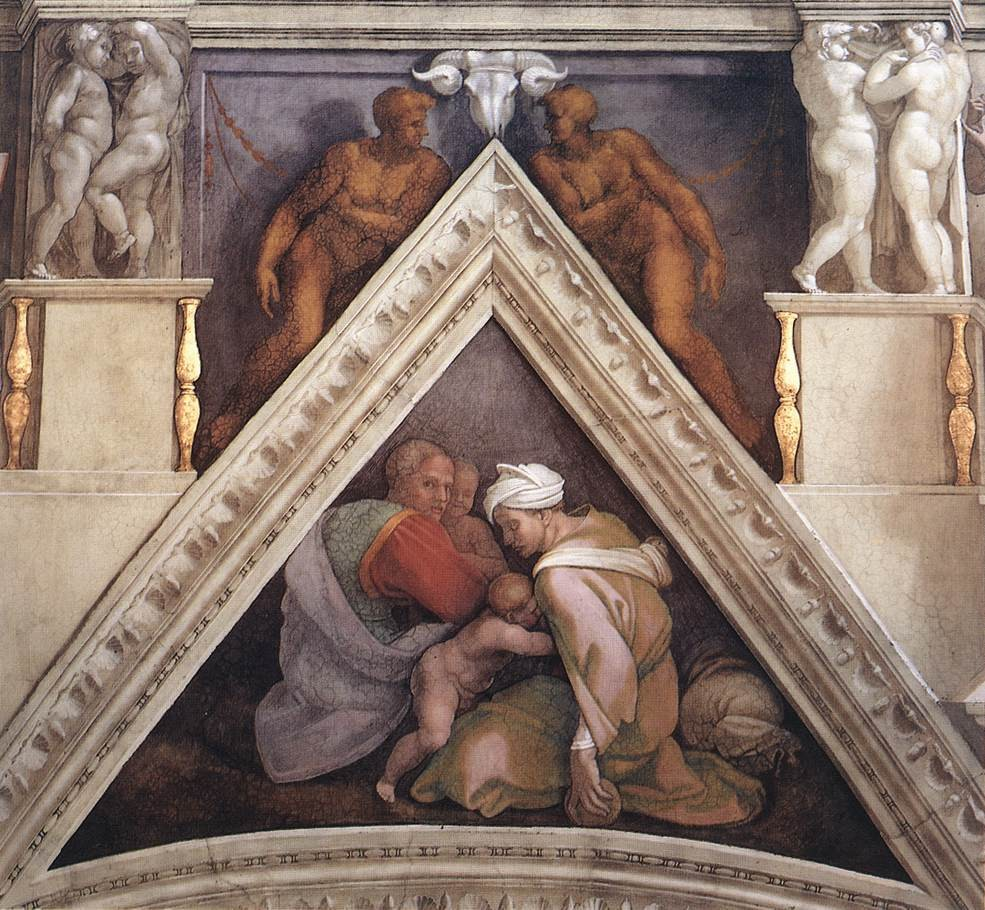
In the Ozias spandrel a young child is attempting to breast feed from his exhausted-looking mother, who clasps a round loaf in her hand.

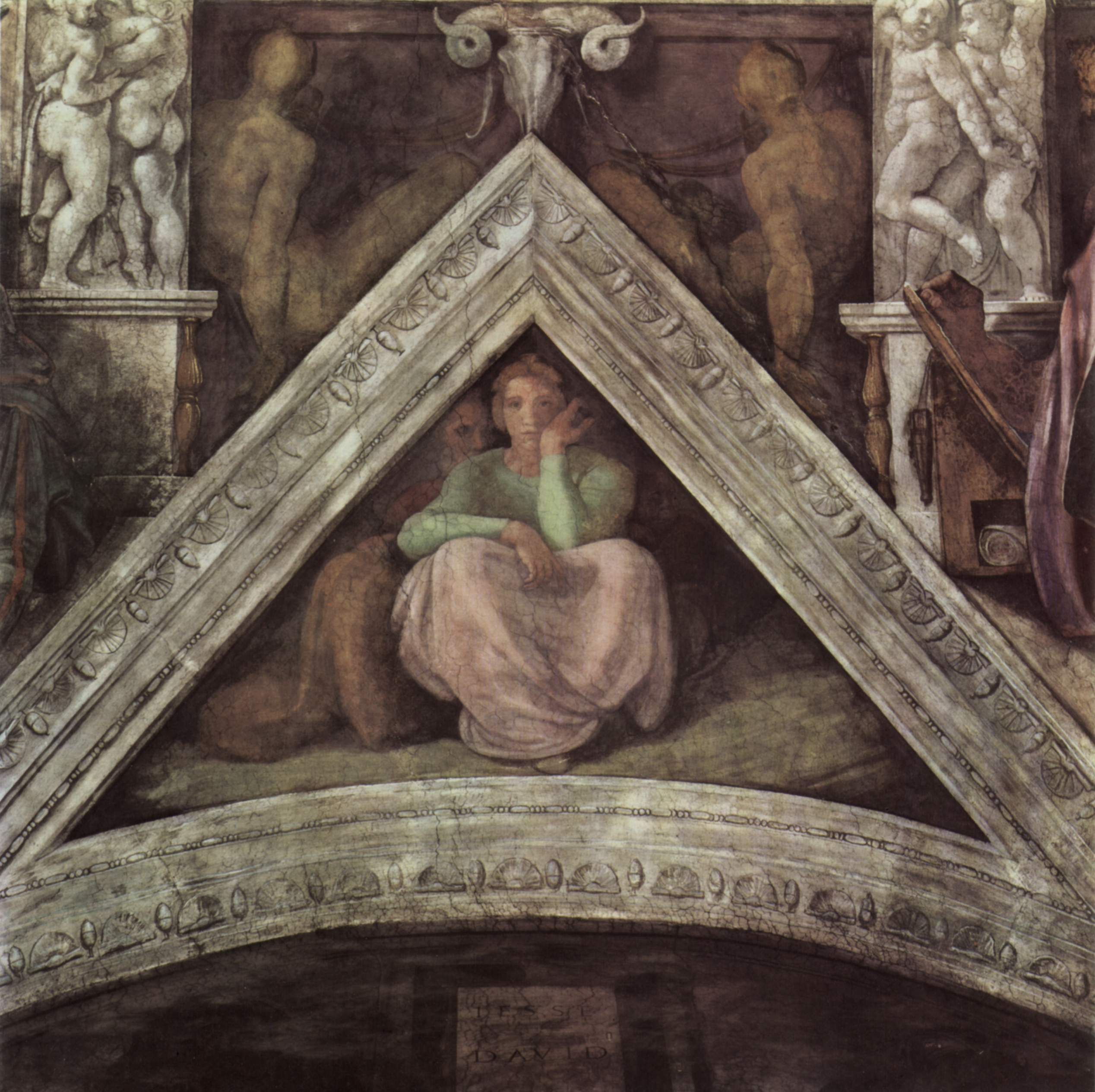
Jesse spandrel, before restoration

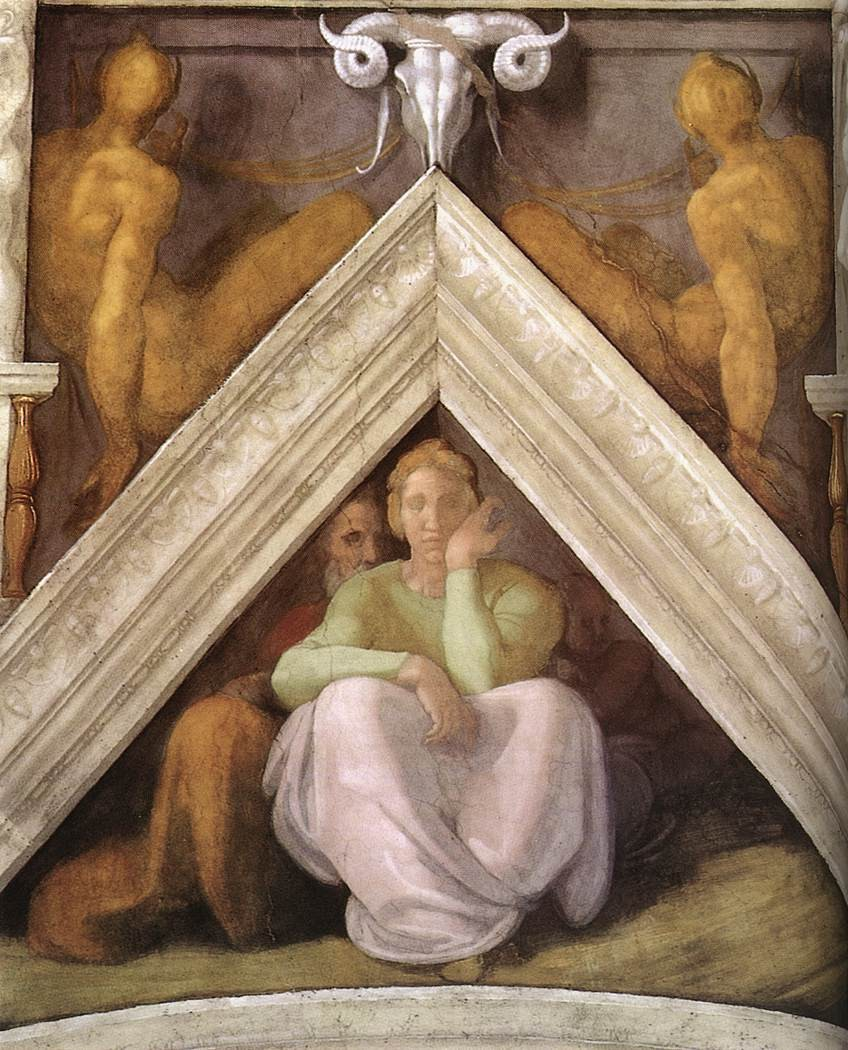
Jesse spandrel, after restoration. In this spandrel, a young woman who may represent the Virgin Mary gazes out with a prophetic expression. The details of her eyes were removed in the recent restoration.

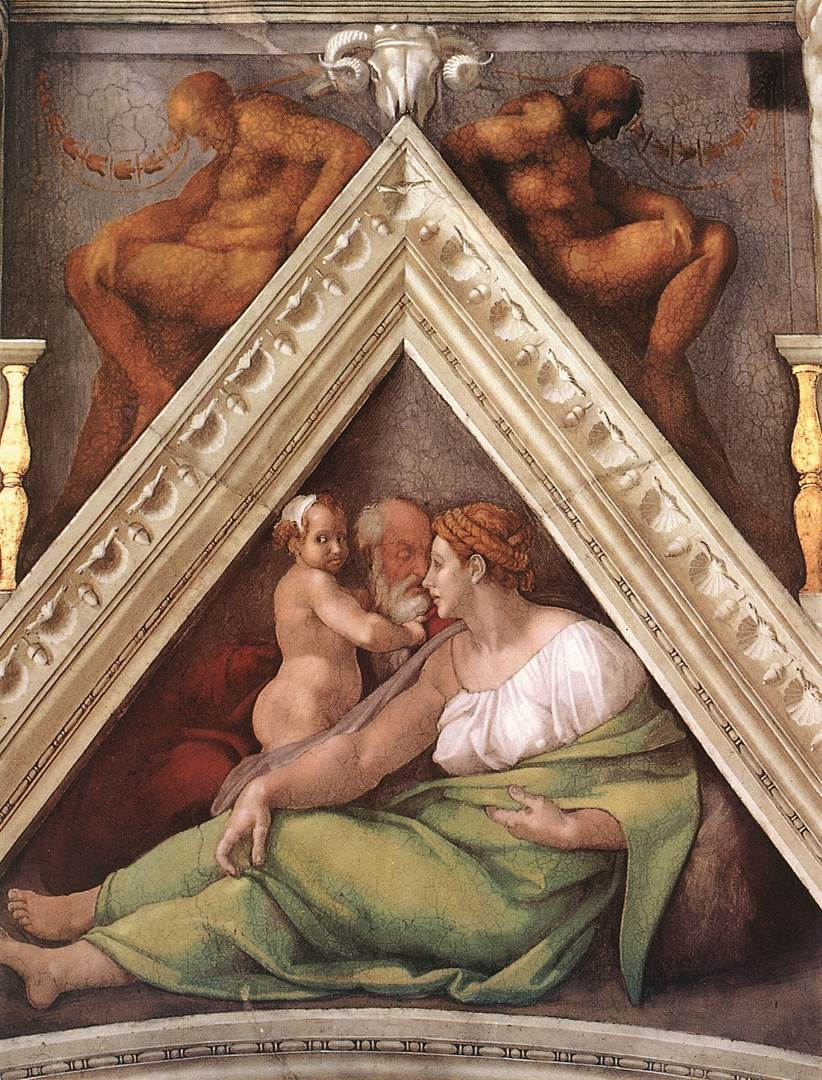
The Ezechias spandrel shows a small child gazing out of the picture.

=== Ignudi ===
The Ignudi that surround the narrative scenes may show the perfection of Humanity, or may represent angels. They were often imitated by other artists.

The Drunkenness of Noah group

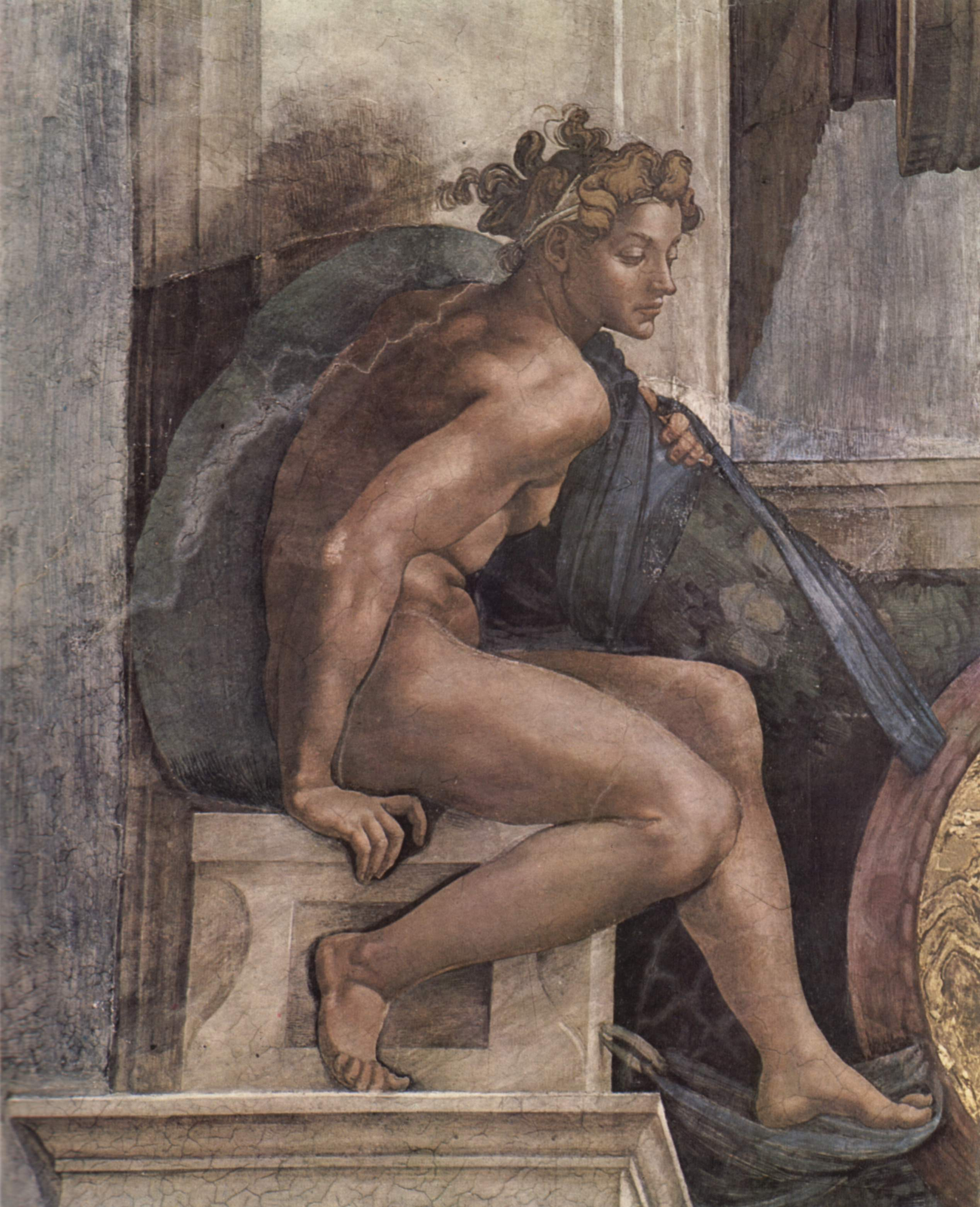

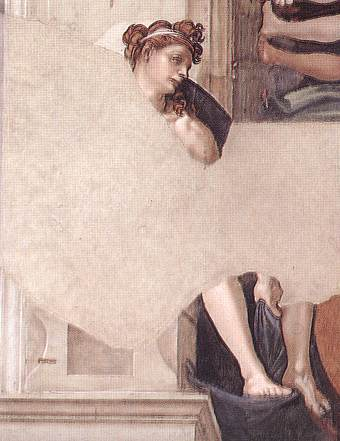
The Sacrifice of Noah group

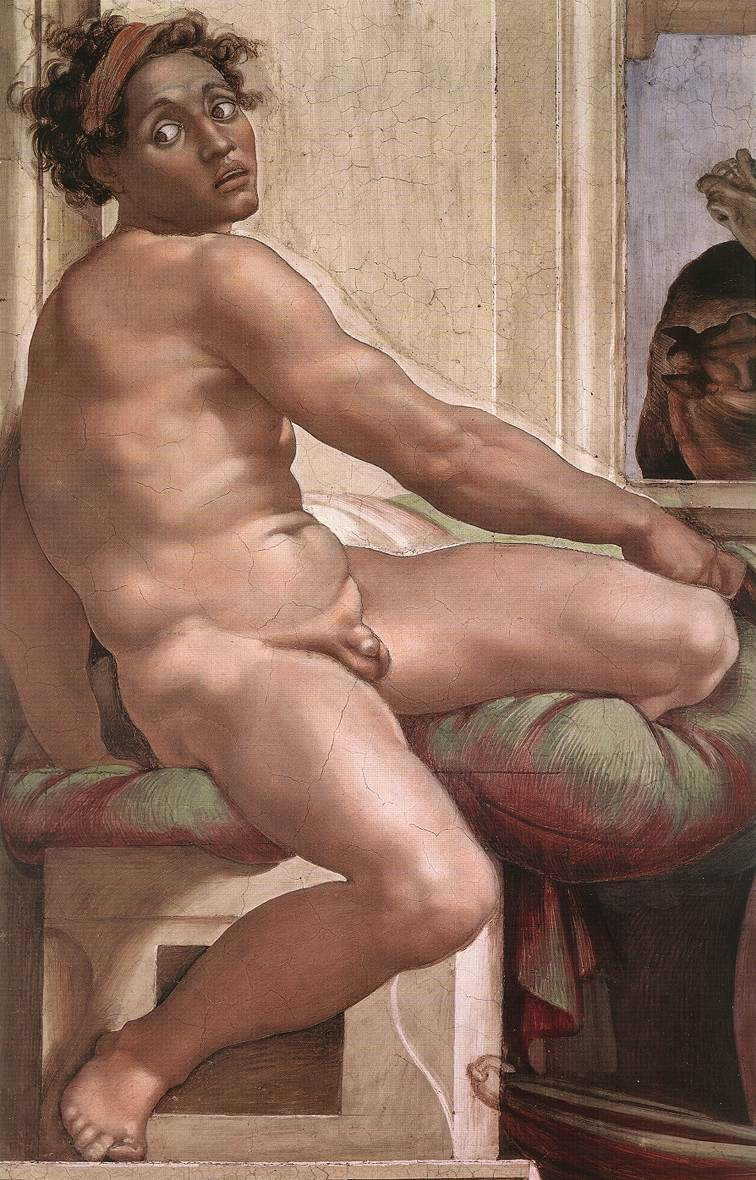

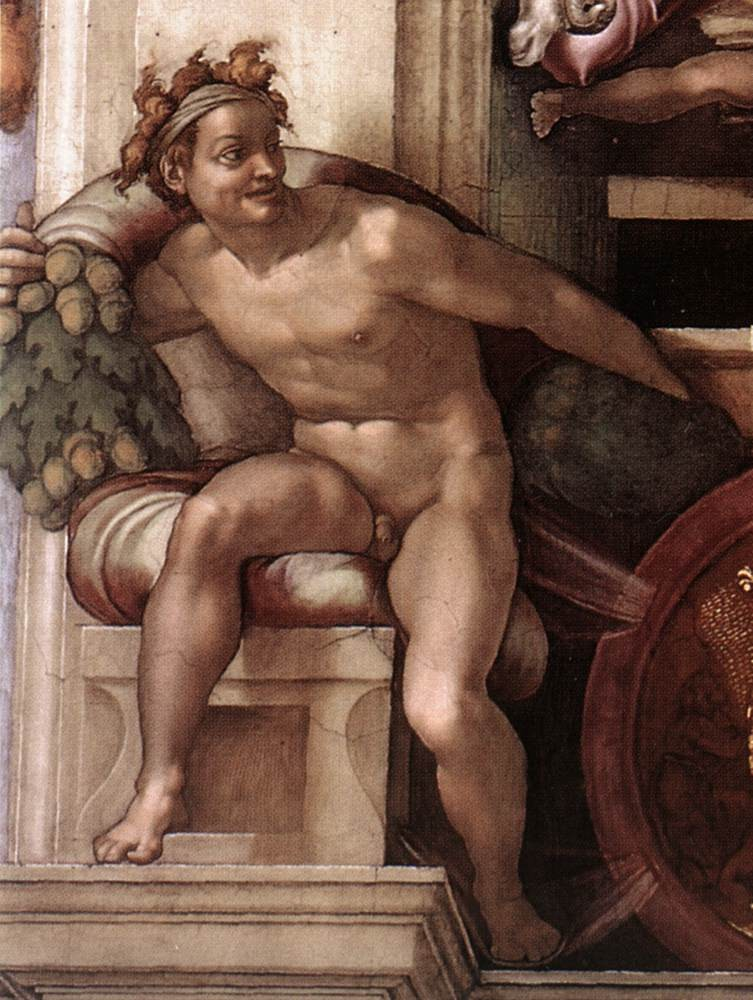

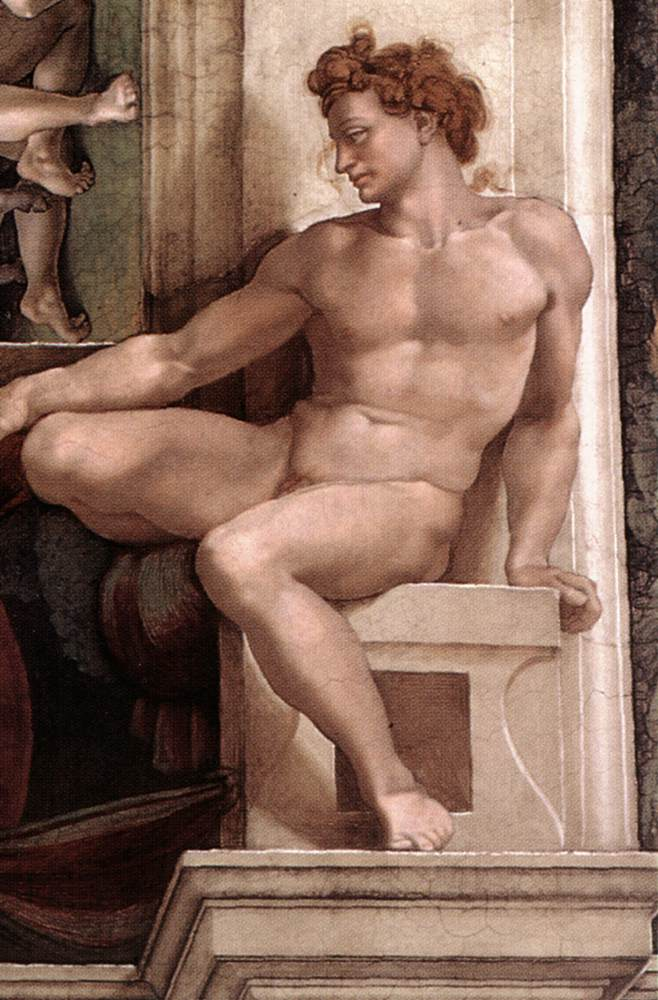
Above the Erithraean Sibyl

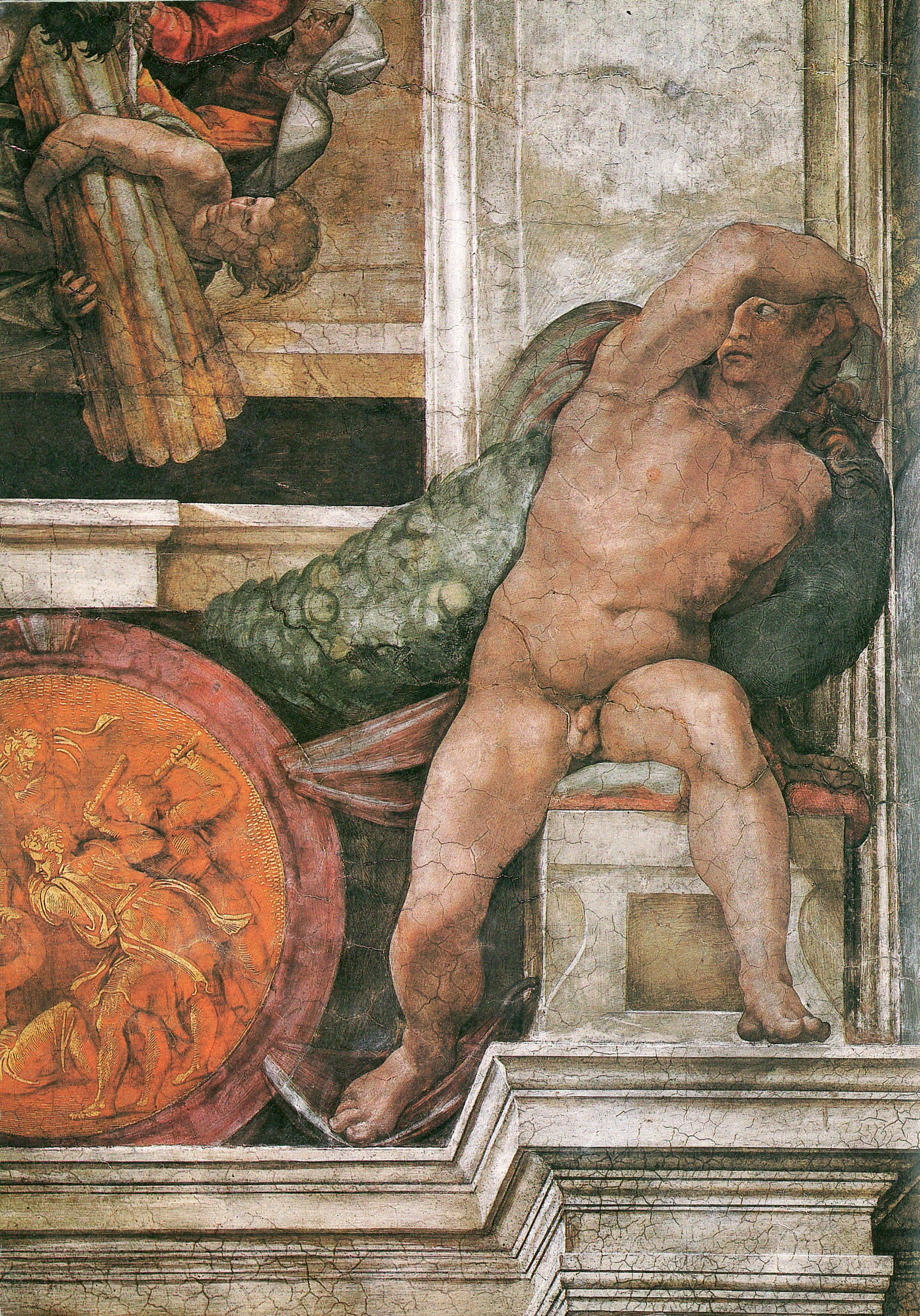
To the right of "Isaiah"
The Creation of Eve group

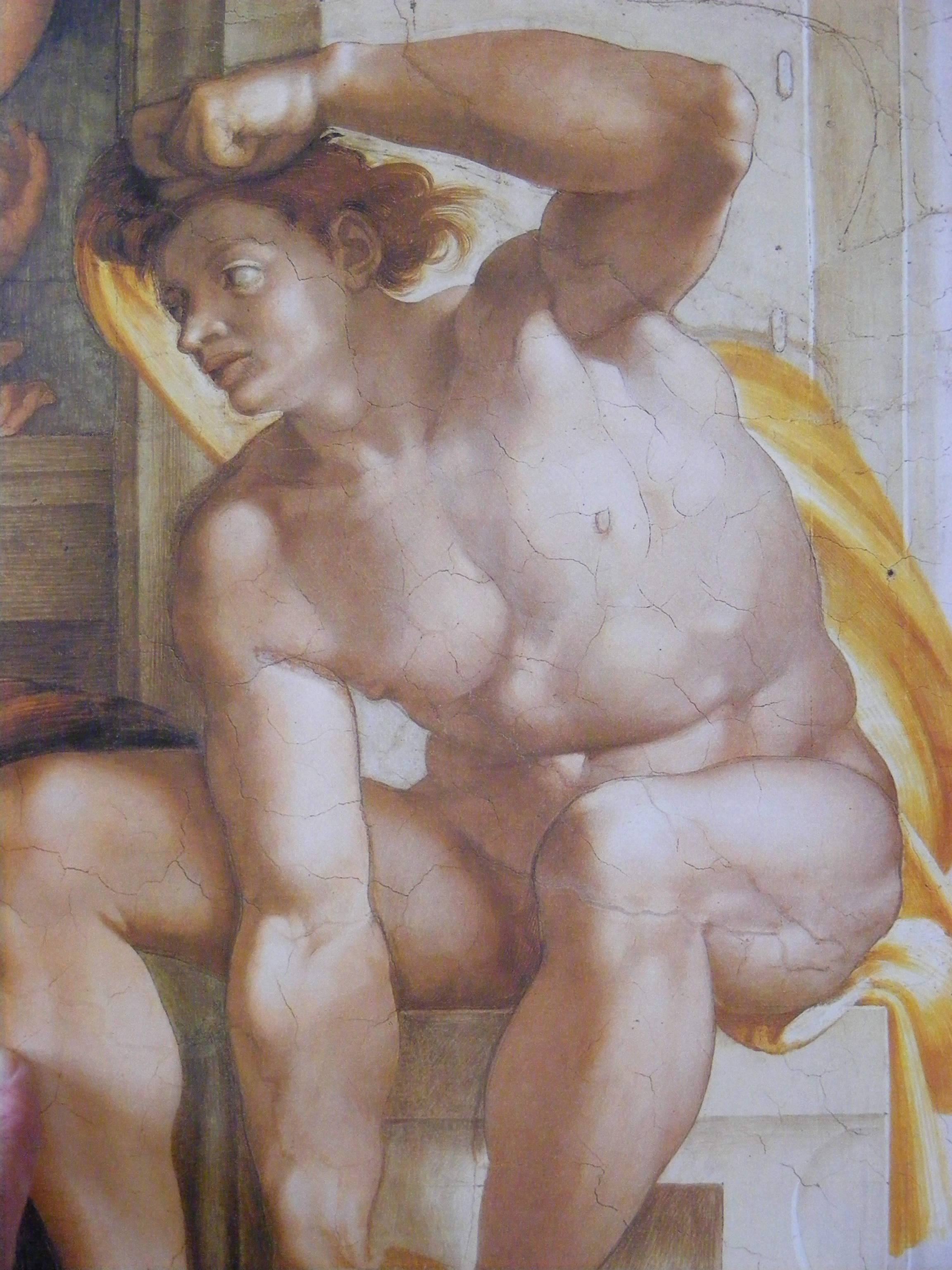

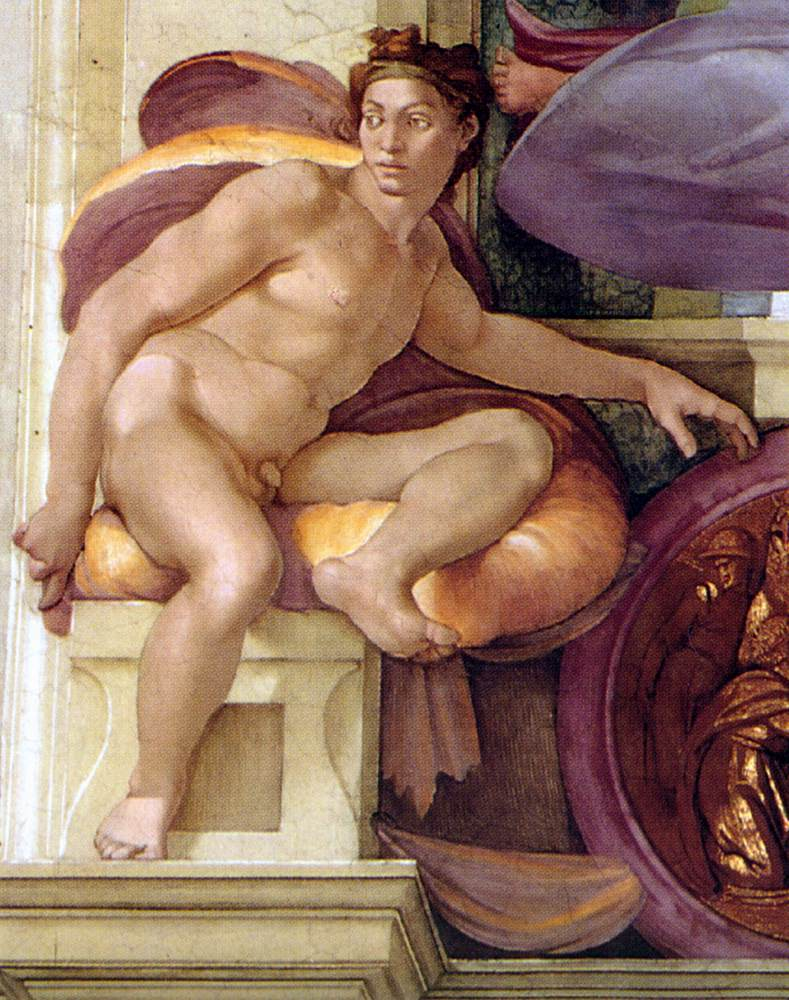
Above the Cumean Sibyl

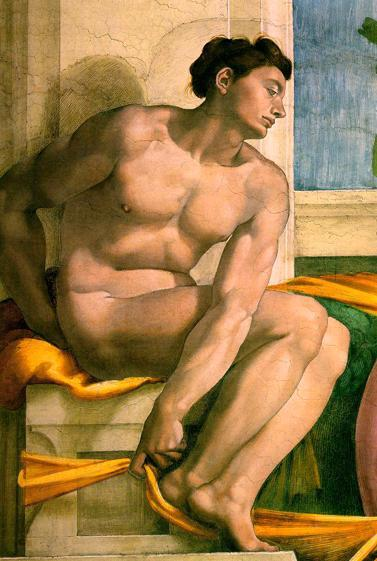
The Separating the Waters group

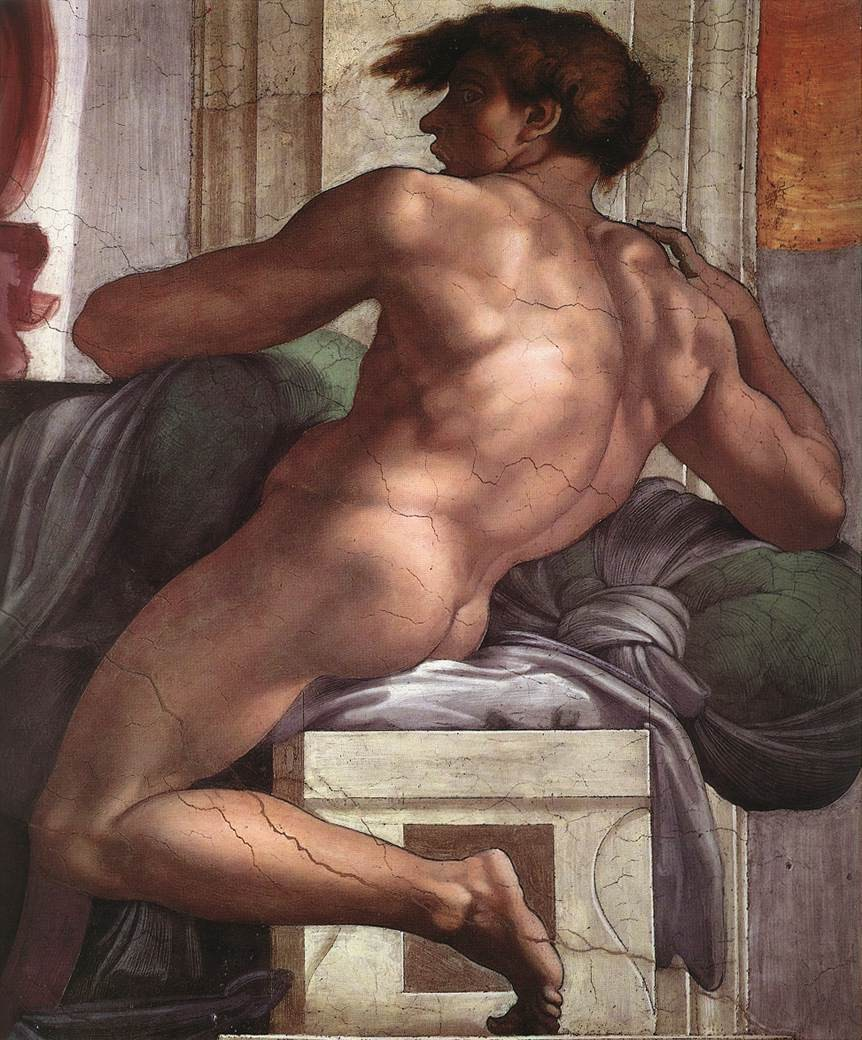
The great muscularity of the lower back of this figure suggests that he was a stonemason.

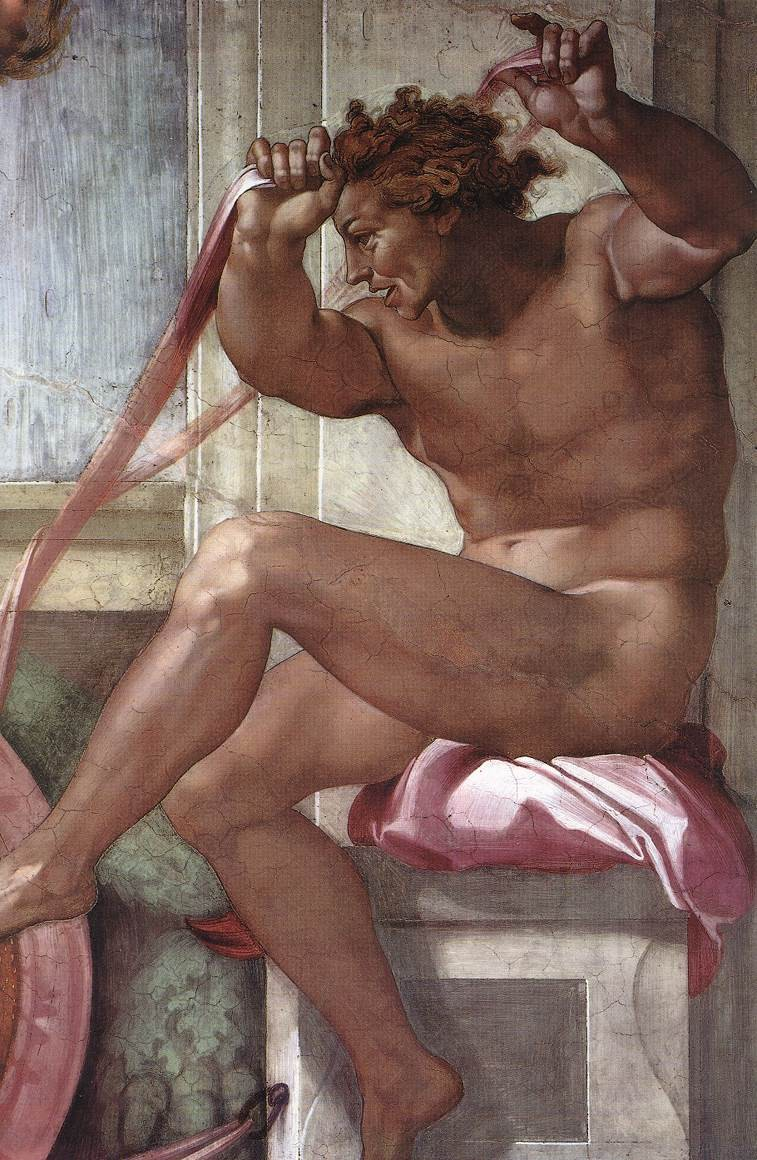

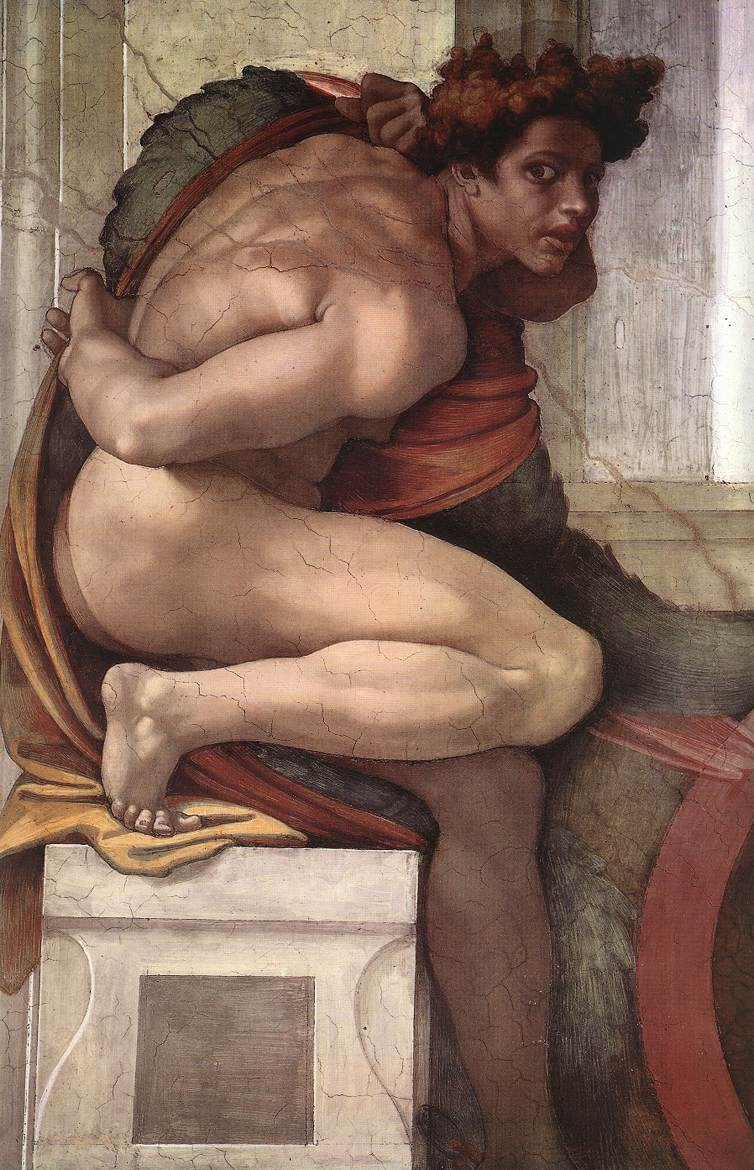
The First Day of Creation group

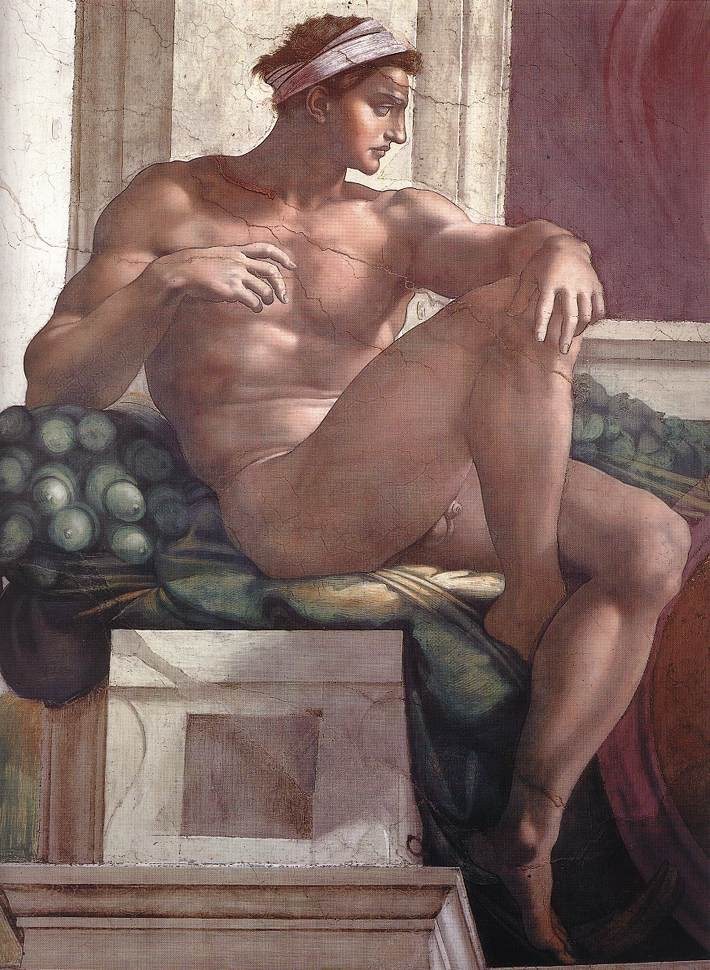
Above Jeremiah. This figure is one of the most reproduced on the ceiling.

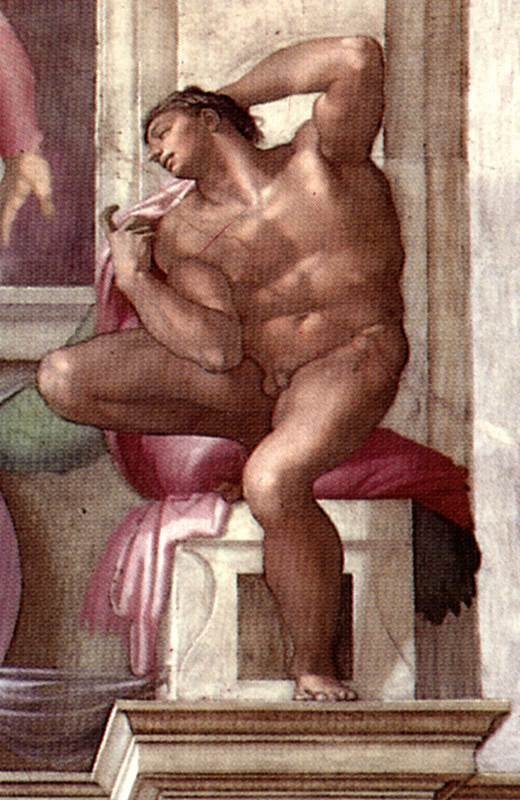
Above Libyan Sibyl

=== Shields ===
There are 10 shields (medallions) representing violent episodes in the history of Israel.

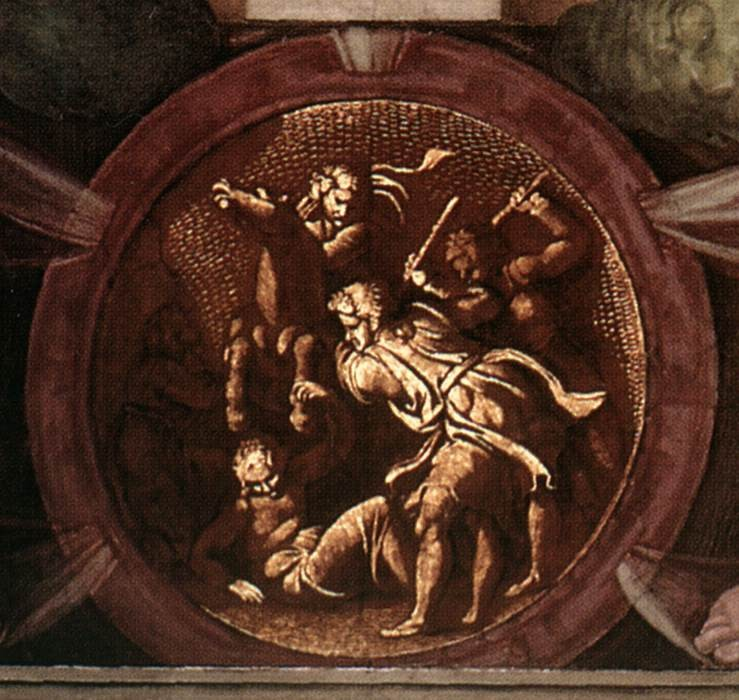
'The Death of Uriah'

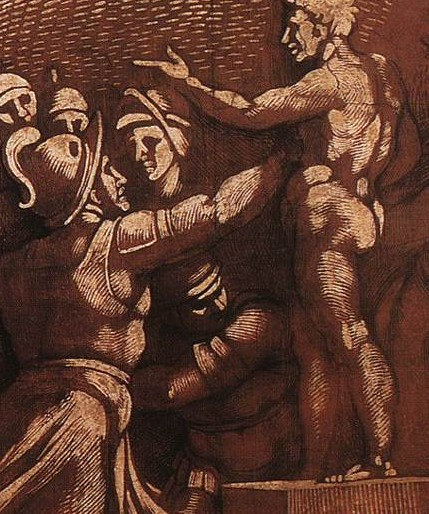
Detail of 'The Idol of Baal'

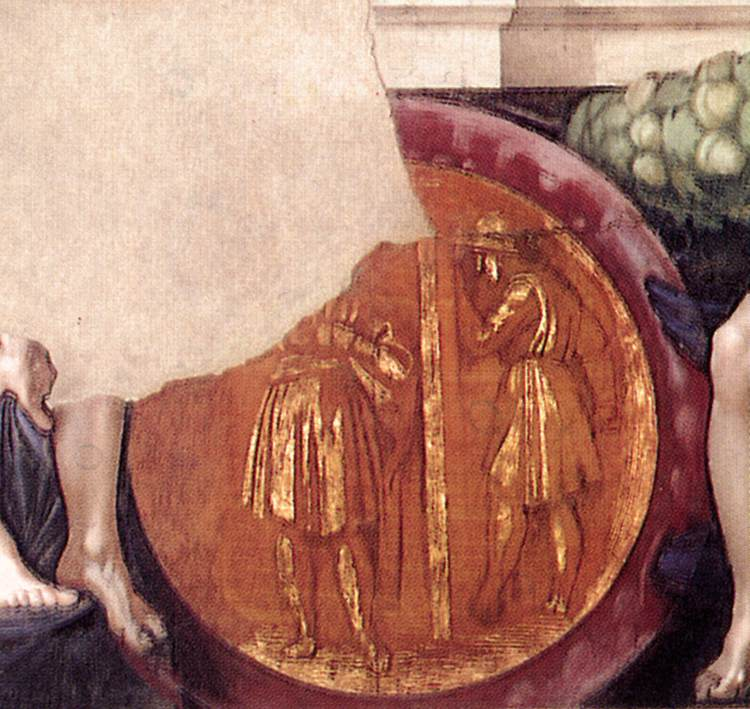
'Joab sneaking up on Abner to murder him' or 'Death of Razis' or 'Suicide of Razis'

== See also ==
- List of works by Michelangelo
- Index of Vatican City-related articles

== Sources ==
- Massimo Giacometti, The Sistine Chapel, a collection of essays on aspects of the chapel, its decoration and the restoration of Michelangelo's frescoes, by Carlo Pietrangeli, André Chastel, John Shearman, John O'Malley S.J., Pierluigi de Vecchi, Michael Hirst, Fabrizio Mancinelli, Gianluigi Colallucci, and Franco Bernabei. 1984, Harmony Books ISBN 0-517-56274-X
- Gabriele Bartz and Eberhard König, Michelangelo, 1998, Könemann, ISBN 3-8290-0253-X
- Hirst, Michael (1994). The Sistine Chapel: A Glorious Restoration. ISBN 978-0810938403.
- Panyard, Christine M. (2013). The Sistine Chapel: a Biblical tour. ISBN 978-0-8091-0593-9.
- Zöllner, Frank; Thoenes, Christof (2022). Michelangelo. ISBN 978-3-8365-3716-2.
