= Altarpiece of San Nicolò della Lattuga =

Altarpiece by Titian

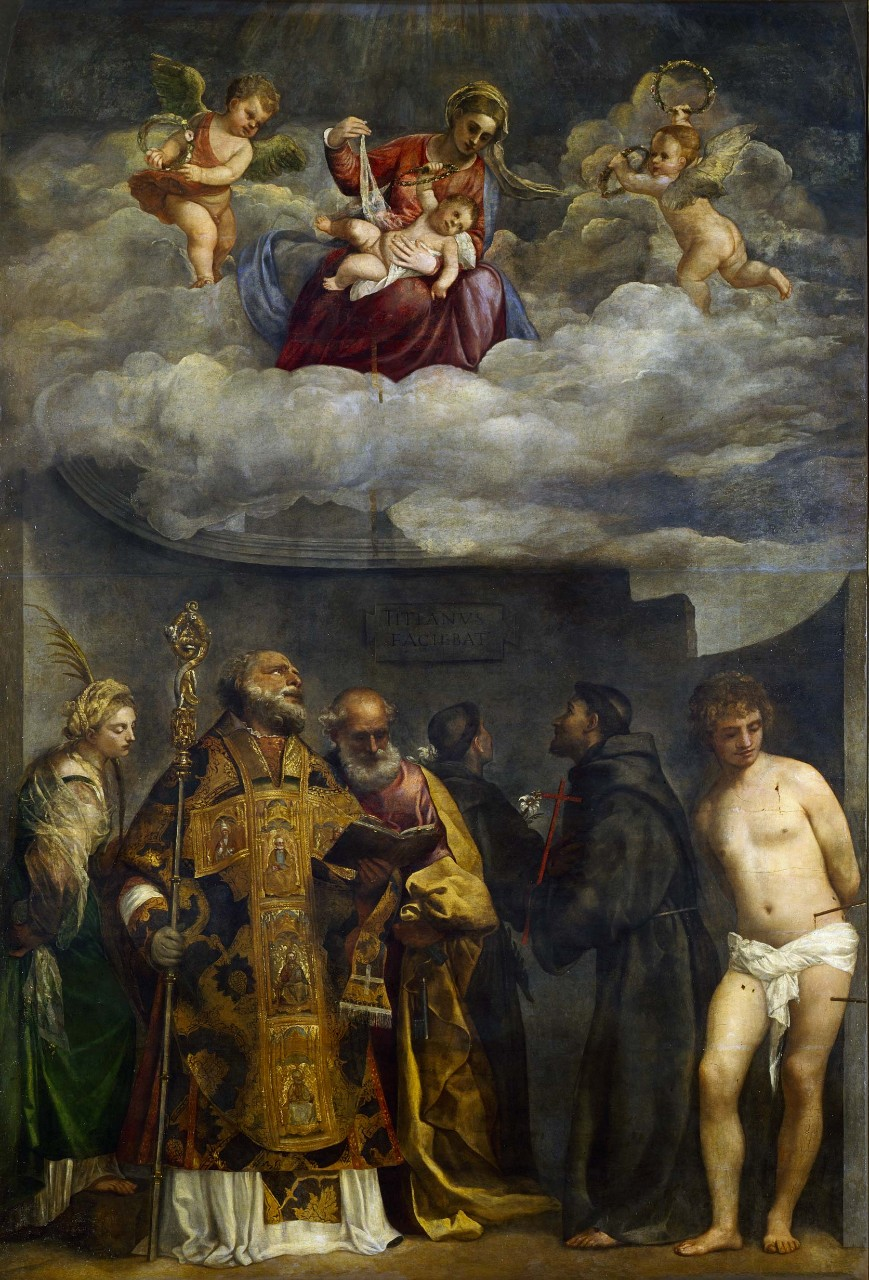
- Madonna of San Nicolò dei Frari
- Artist: Titian
- Catalogue: 40351
- Medium: Oil on wood transferred to canvas
- Dimensions: 388×260 cm
- Location: Vatican Museums, Vatican City (since 1820)

The Altarpiece of San Nicolò della Lattuga, also known as the Altarpiece of San Nicolò dei Frari or Madonna di San Nicolò dei Frari, is a work by Titian painted in oil on panel. It was begun in 1522, finished in 1535, and later transferred to canvas. It comes from the Venetian church of the same name, before its destruction, and is exhibited in the Vatican.

== History ==
The provenance of the painting remains uncertain. The first to raise doubts about the attribution was Italian biographer Giorgio Vasari, who claimed that the original commission had been given to Titian's pupil, Paris Bordone, when he was 18. However, Vasari acknowledged that Bordone was already actively working as an artist at that time. The master "contrived by means of friends and favours to get it out of his hands, perhaps to prevent his giving proof of his ability at so early a period; perhaps, also, induced by the love of gain".

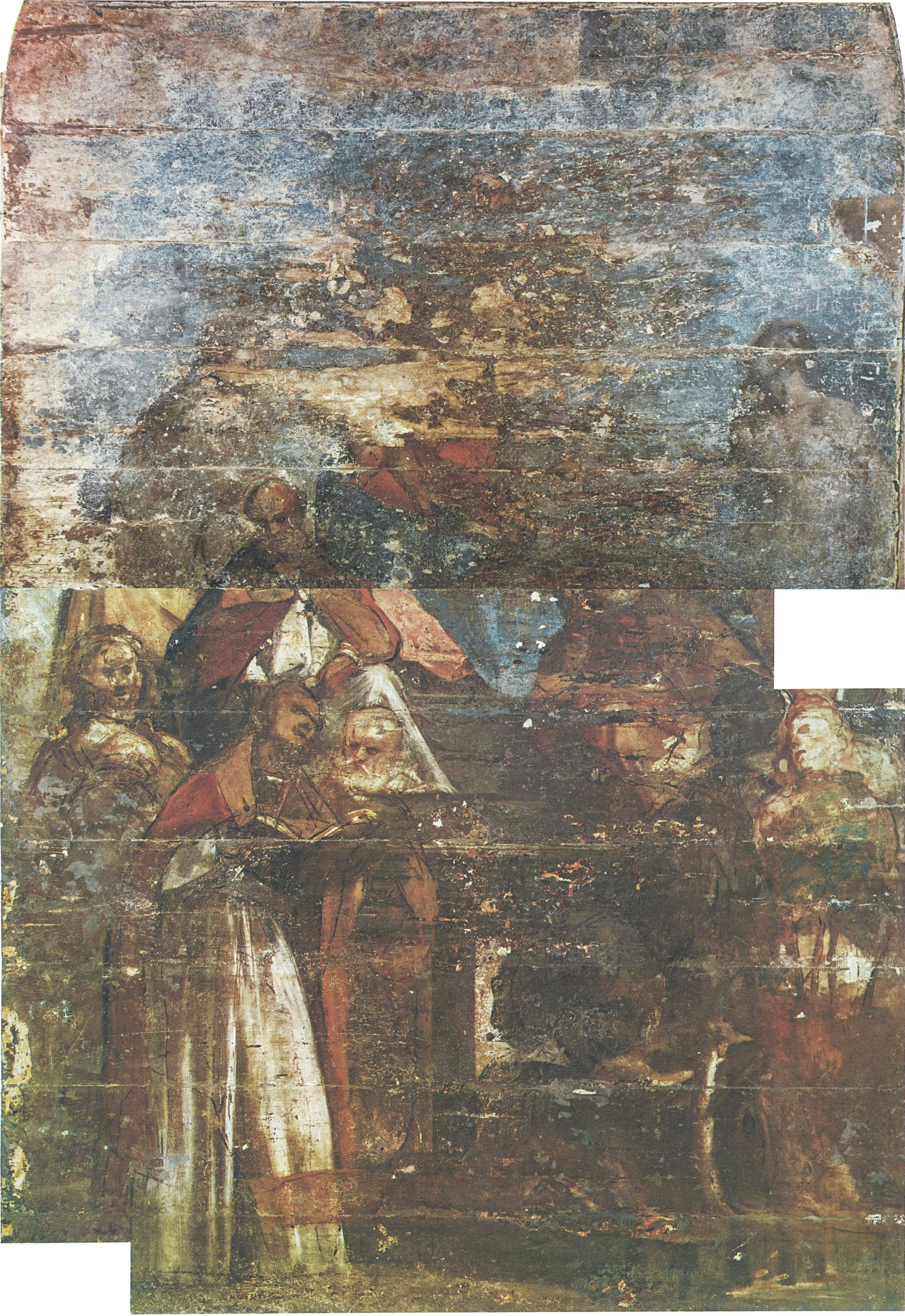
Painting under the pictorial layer of the final altarpiece, 1514-1515; mirror image of the painting during the restoration of 1960-1966.

However, the resulting date of 1518 (Bordone was born in 1500) is substantially contradicted by the publication of a document from 1770 that gives the date of the commission as 1514. The transport of the painting on canvas in 1960 revealed that there was another version of the painting, with a different composition, underneath the final version (the one Titian began in 1514-1515 and left unfinished). It has been proven that Bordone was not able to work independently until 1520.

Vecellio abandoned the first pyramidal version to devote himself to more prestigious commissions. In 1518, again for the Frari complex, he delivered the altarpiece of the Assumption and in 1519 he dedicated himself to the Pesaro altarpiece. On the other hand, he already had many commissions from the authorities, and on some panels of the first version of the altarpiece for San Nicolò traces of another painting with a lake landscape have been found. It is probably the one described in the painter's letter to Alfonso d'Este: "I have not forgotten the lake that your illustrious lordship ordered me to paint". This painting was later abandoned in favor of the new Estense order of the Worship of Venus (1518-1519), the first canvas in the Bacchanal series for the Duke's dressing room (1519-1523).

In the eighteenth century, the friars complained several times to the Procuratori de Ultra, who were in charge of the legal protection of the Church, about the precarious state of the painting. Thus, in 1740, Gaetano Zompini offered to restore it. But in 1751, the Prior Barbarigo had to insist on the terrible state of the painting, which "is deteriorating day by day and will undoubtedly be completely lost in a few years".

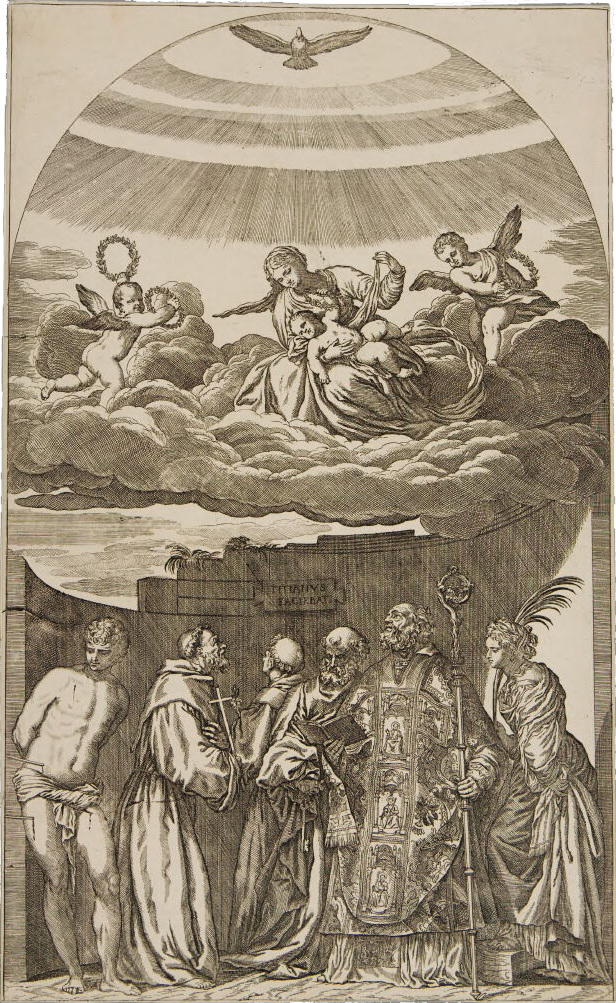
The work before its destruction: Valentin Lefebvre after Titian, Altarpiece of San Nicolò dei Frari, before 1677, etching (there is also an 18th-century chiaroscuro engraving made in 1742 by John Baptist Jackson).

Finally, in 1770, the altarpiece was sold to the British consul John Udny for 300 zecchini. He arranged for a first restoration. The "famous painting by Titian in the main chapel" had been removed from the site and Zanetti, who had praised it in 1733, confirming Boschini's quote, no longer mentioned it among the public works of Cadore in his guide published in 1771. The purchase price was paid to the Mint as a deposit for the Consul's promise to replace the painting within two years with a new work by Giambettino Cimaroli (Pompeo Batoni, who had been contacted earlier, had refused the commission). However, Cimaroli died the following year and the consul's project was not carried out. His deposit was therefore confiscated by the procurators, who appointed Giuseppe Angeli to replace him. The painter delivered the painting in 1774, depicting St. Nicholas calming the stormy sea. However, there is no trace of this new work and it is not even mentioned in the report of the paintings taken over by Pietro Edwards in 1807, after the suppression of the convent.

Thanks to the efforts of Giovanni Volpato and Gavin Hamilton, Pope Clement XIV was persuaded to purchase Titian's altarpiece. The work was first exhibited in the Quirinal Palace, where it was seen by Goethe in 1786, accompanied by Tischbein, and then transferred by Pius VII to the Vatican, where it became the Vatican Art Gallery in 1817.

During the first relocation, the painting was divided into two parts to make it easier to transport; during the subsequent relocation, the arched part was removed so that it would be a counterpart to Raphael's Transfiguration.

By 1960, the wooden support had deteriorated to the point that the painting had to be transferred to canvas. When the painted surface on the reverse was removed, the first layer of the work became visible, as well as traces of the previous landscape. A new restoration was carried out on the occasion of the Titian exhibition at the Scuderie del Quirinale in 2013.

Cavalcaselle and Crowe confused the painting with the fresco of the Chapel of San Nicolò in the Doge's Palace; their dating of the painting to 1523, taken from Sanudo's diaries, may not be correct. Before the recent confirmation of the consensus on the date 1522/1526 (or at least around the first half of the 1520s), the following authors had already expressed a preference for a similar date: Burckhardt (1898, in which he corrected the earlier later date he had given in 1855), Venturi (1928), and Longhi (1948). On the other hand, Mayer (1937), Pallucchini (1969), and Valcanover (1969) considered the work to be later, around 1535. Hood and Hope (1977) proposed an extension of the period to 1532/1538, citing as further evidence the fact that the signature is Titianus instead of Ticianus, a form they believed to have been adopted after the painter's appointment as count palatine. However, the signature Titianus also appears on the Gozzi Altarpiece of 1520 and the signature Ticianus on the St. John the Baptist of 1540.

== Description and style ==
=== First version ===
As far as is known, the remains of the first version of the altarpiece had a different general layout, built with the classic Bellini pyramidal structure, with a number of nine or ten saints that are difficult to identify with certainty. However, unlike the previous one, the St. Mark's altarpiece presents a variation of the scheme, placing the non-protagonist saints on different levels, no longer emerging from a single baseline. This is the solution that Titian probably found in the altarpiece of St. Ambrose of the Milanese by Alvise Vivarini, present for about ten years in the third chapel on the left of the apse of the Frari Basilica and, before that, painted by the same author in the Belluno altarpiece around 1485, which then went to the Kaiser-Friedrich-Museum in Berlin and was destroyed in 1945. A solution that Carpaccio later experimented with in the two Sacred Conversations of Koper (1516) and Piran (1518).

=== Second version ===
For the second version, it is possible to think of a post quem date, defined by the dedication on the marble frame: "Almae Virgini Mariae, Redemptoris Matri, Hanc Aram Frater Germanus DivI Nicolai dicavit MDXXII". In this new composition, strengthened by his experience of the Assumption, he abandoned the scheme of a closed symmetrical pyramid and the expressiveness of the saints present, replacing them with more pronounced and varied gestures in the group below.

This is evidenced by the pages in which Goethe recalls November 3, 1786, when, accompanied by his friend, the painter Tischbein, he went to the Quirinal to attend a Mass for the repose of the souls of the deceased celebrated by Pope Pius VI in the private chapel of the Palace. After the service, he visited the rest of the Residence, lingering over the work of art and wanting to share his feelings for this "work of art of inestimable value":

Still more struck was I with a picture of Titian's. It throws into the shade all I have hitherto seen. Whether my eye is more practised, or whether it is really the most excellent, I cannot determine.

The poet was not interested in identifying the various figures, nor did he probably have any documentation at his disposal, but rather, as he commented at the end, he was attentive to the ensemble of the various figures and thus continued the description:

An immense mass-robe, stiff with embroidery and gold-embossed figures, envelopes the dignified frame of a bishop. With a massive pastoral staff in his left hand, he is gazing with a look of rapture toward heaven, while he holds in his right a book, out of which he seems to have imbibed the divine enthusiasm with which he is inspired. Behind him a beautiful maiden, holding a palm-branch in her hand, and full of affectionate sympathy, is looking over his shoulder into the open book.

He was referring to the figures of St. Nicholas and St. Catherine of Alexandria. The presence of the Bishop of Myra, especially venerated in Venice, was obligatory, since he was the titular saint of the church of origin. But while in the other Venetian churches named after him he was seen as the protector of sailors, here he stands out from the other figures and "his great stature" defines him as "a sure bulwark, a solid pillar of the Church". Ridolfi had noted how his head resembled that of Laocoön, the main figure of the sculptural group found in 1506, of which numerous drawings were immediately circulated. The drawing reveals Titian's meticulous research into classical antiquity at the time. Dolce, on the other hand, praised the rendering of the garments for "the brilliance and hardness of the gold, which seems to be really woven", and the head, "truly marvelous and full of infinite majesty". This figure was also the model for Lorenzo Lotto's St. Nicholas in Glory and was literally reproduced in St. Zeno of the altarpiece by Jacopo Bassano in Borso del Grappa.

The blonde St. Catherine is characterized only by the martyr's palm and the peplos, which are tinted by the light to an almost monochromatic bronze. Although her devotion was still present in Venice, a preference on the part of the prior Germano da Casale is plausible who, about twenty years earlier, when he was prior of the convent of San Rocco in Mestre, had commissioned from Cima a triptych dedicated to this martyr. Like Goethe, the ancient critics dwelt on the beauty and elegance of Catherine, "of a very gentle nature", and on her "graceful bearing, in her face and in every divine part of her".

To the right of the first group, St. Peter, with the heavy keys hanging from an invisible belt, seems to be looking into Nicolò's open book. Dressed in red with a golden mantle, he almost merges with the latter's figure, as if he were his inspiration. The saint was chosen to commemorate the previous prior, Pietro da Lucignano, who had begun the reconstruction of the small church.

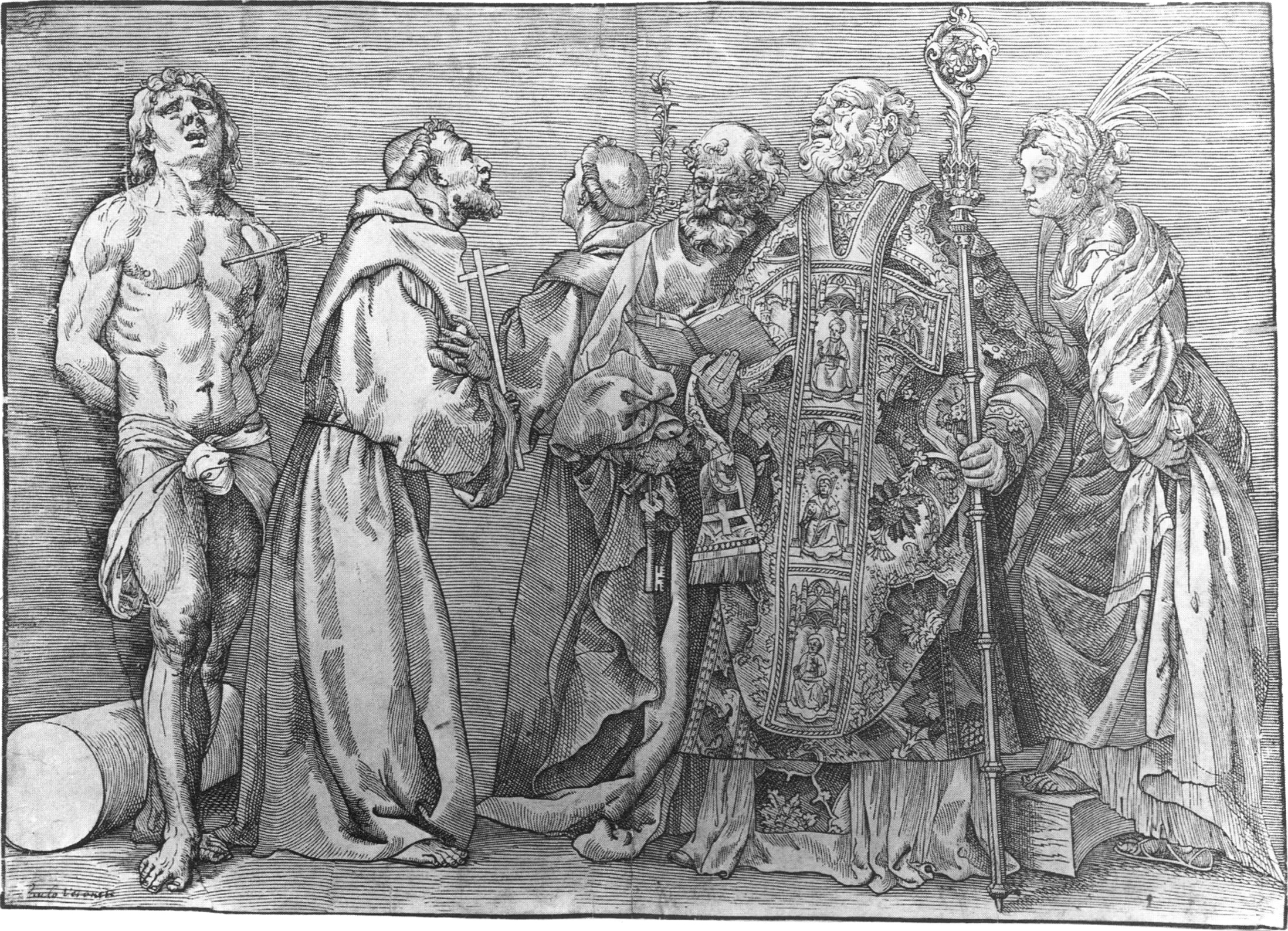
Anonymous after Titian, Six saints, 16th century, woodcut

Goethe then went on to comment on the figure of St. Sebastian on the opposite side:

Over against this group, a naked, well-made youth, wounded with an arrow, and in chains, is looking straight before him, with a slight expression of resignation in his countenance. [...]

A figure that, according to Dolce, particularly impressed Pordenone: "When Pordonone went to see Saint Sebastian, he said: I think Titian put flesh on that nude and not paint". Ridolfi also shared this opinion: "Since Titian has represented this nude so delicately, with so few touches, it seems to be real flesh".

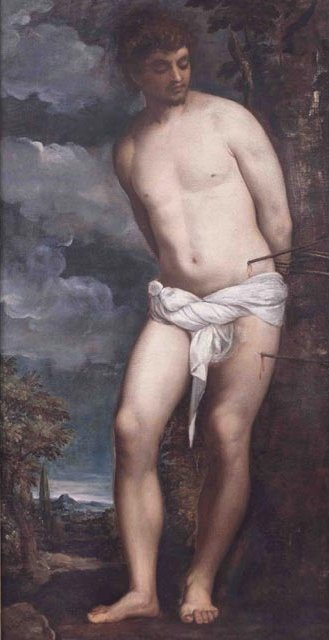
Titian, Saint Sebastian, 1530?, New York, private collection

Vasari, on the other hand, emphasizes that it is "exactly copied from the life without the slightest admixture of art, no efforts for the sake of beauty have been sought in any part, trunk or limbs: all is as Nature left it". The drawing of the figure, well planted on its feet and with only the torso slightly bent forward, lacks the classical contrapposto, as does the younger Sebastian in the St. Mark's Altar (1510), as opposed to the more articulated Martyr in the Averoldi Polyptych. In short, a rather elementary natural version, a fact that led Hood and Hope to suggest the intervention of his brother Francesco, an intervention expressly denied by others. Sebastian's face and legs appear radically modified in the woodcut, which was "drawn on wood by Titian himself, and was then engraved and painted by others", but in another painting by Titian, from a private New York collection, he returns to exactly this natural version, painted against a tree and a landscape in the background.

In contrast to the brighter figures that tend to the foreground, emerging from the shadows, humbly secluded and with their backs turned, the figures of Saints Anthony and Francis - very similar to their own figures in the Pesaro altarpiece - look up at the heavenly creatures: the preacher and the founder of the Order of Friars Minor, one with the Lily of Purity and the other with the Cross of the Passion.

The entire group of saints is gathered in a ruined and roofless exedra, open to the sky. A motif that Rocco Marconi would reproduce in the two altarpieces of the Academy in Venice and the Alte Pinakothek in Munich.

In the sky above the semicircular room, supported by the clouds, there is a Madonna and Child with two little angels:

[…] Above moves a Madonna in highest glory, sympathising with all that passes below. The young, sprightly child on her bosom, with a radiant countenance, is holding out a crown, and seems, indeed, on the point of casting it down. On both sides, angels are floating by, who hold in their hands crowns in abundance.

This Madonna and Child has been compared to the lunette frescoed by Titian in the Doge's Palace with the same subject, mainly because of the intimate pose of the two figures and the literal reproduction of the little angel on the right.

Goethe was able to see the dove of the Holy Spirit, from which the light that illuminated the scene descended, still intact in the curved section of the painting:

High above all the figures, and even the triple-rayed aureola, soars the celestial dove, as at once the centre and finish of the whole group.

The destruction of the altarpiece, from which only a few fragments have been saved, has altered the perception of the painting, which is characterized by the effect of the luminosity of the Holy Spirit, who transports the Virgin and Child to the earth through the "great basin [that] seems to be broken by the flow of clouds" in a "shadow broken by vibrations of light, a song that becomes more sonorous the more it contrasts, an instrument of pictorial splendor and monumental emphasis".

== See also ==
- List of works by Titian

== Bibliography ==
- Venturi, Adolfo (1928). Storia dell'arte italiana - La pittura del Cinquecento [History of Italian art - 16th century painting] (in Italian). Milano: Hoepli.
- Pallucchini, Rodolfo (1969). Tiziano [Titian] (in Italian). Firenze: Sansoni. pp. 75–76.
- Hood, William; Hope, Charles (1977), Titian's Vatican Altarpiece and the Pictures Underneath, vol. 59, pp. 534–552
- Vio, Gastone (1980). La pala di Tiziano a S. Nicolò della Lattuga (S. Nicoletto dei Frari) [Titian's “Altarpiece of S. Nicolò della Lattuga” (St. Nicholas of the Frari)] (in Italian). Vol. 34. p. 210-213.
- Humfrey, Peter (1993). The Prehistory of Titian's Assunta. Vol. 45. pp. 222–243.
- Rosand, David (1994). Titian's Saint Sebastians. Vol. 15. pp. 23–39.
- Humfrey, Peter; Sherman, Allison (2015). The Lost Church of San Niccolò ai Frari (San Nicoletto) in Venice and its Painted Decoration. Vol. 36. pp. 247–281.
- Villa, Giovanni Carlo Federico (2013). Tiziano [Titian] (in Italian). Cinisello Balsamo: Silvana.
