= John Skip =

John Skip, Skipp, Skippe, or Skypp may refer to:

- John Skypp (c. 1495–1552), English cleric and Bishop of Hereford
- John Skippe (1741–1812), English amateur artist
- John Skipp (born 1957), American horror and fantasy author
