= Vatican Museums =

Museums of the Vatican City

- Musei Vaticani

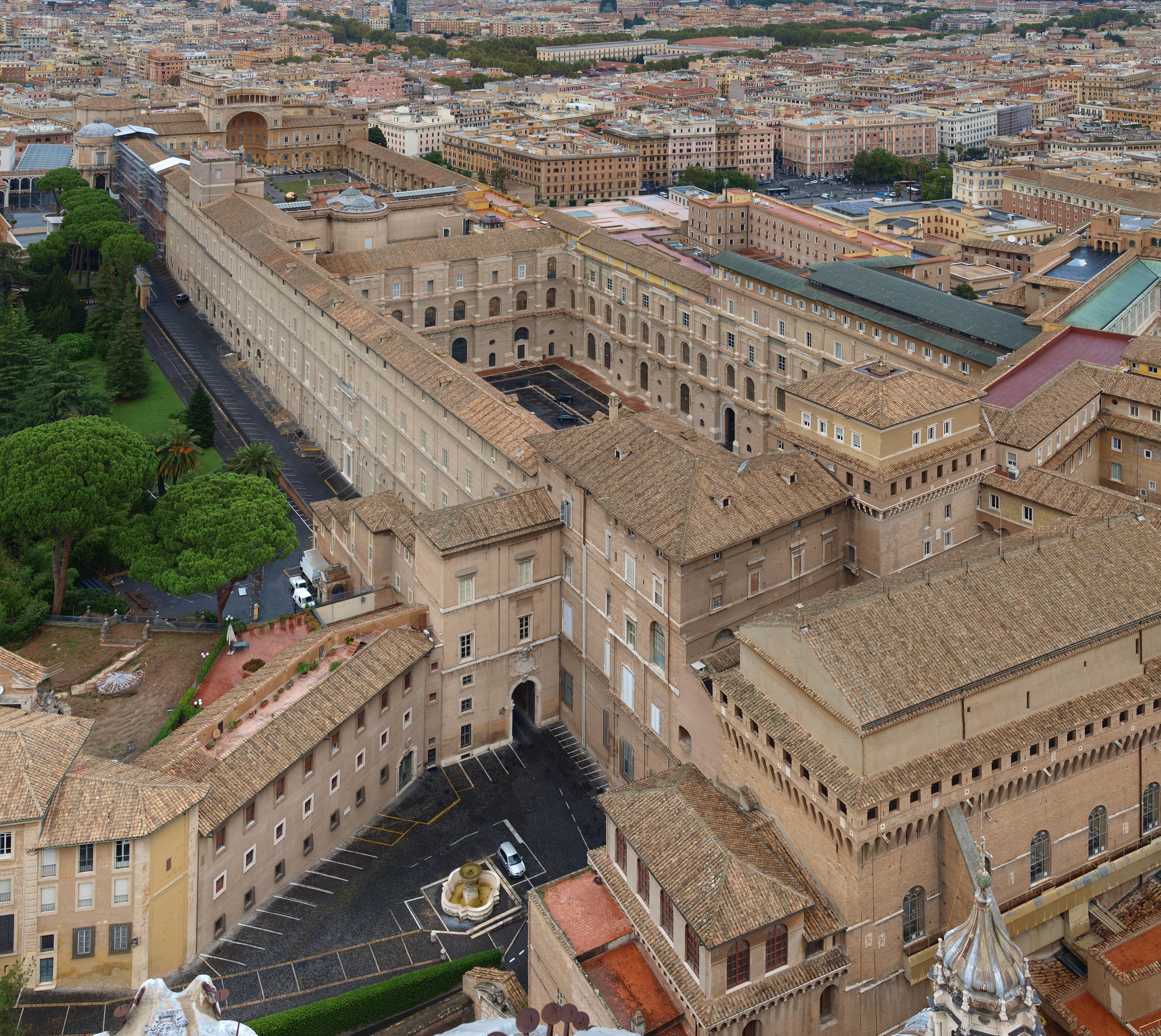
- The Vatican Museums as seen from the dome of St. Peter's Basilica
- Established: 1506; 520 years ago
- Location: Vatican City; Viale Vaticano 6, I-00192, Rome
- Coordinates: 41°54′23″N 12°27′16″E
- Type: Art museum
- Collection size: 70,000
- Visitors: 6,825,436 (2024)
- Director: Barbara Jatta
- Public transit access: Ottaviano – San Pietro – Musei Vaticani
- Website: www.museivaticani.va

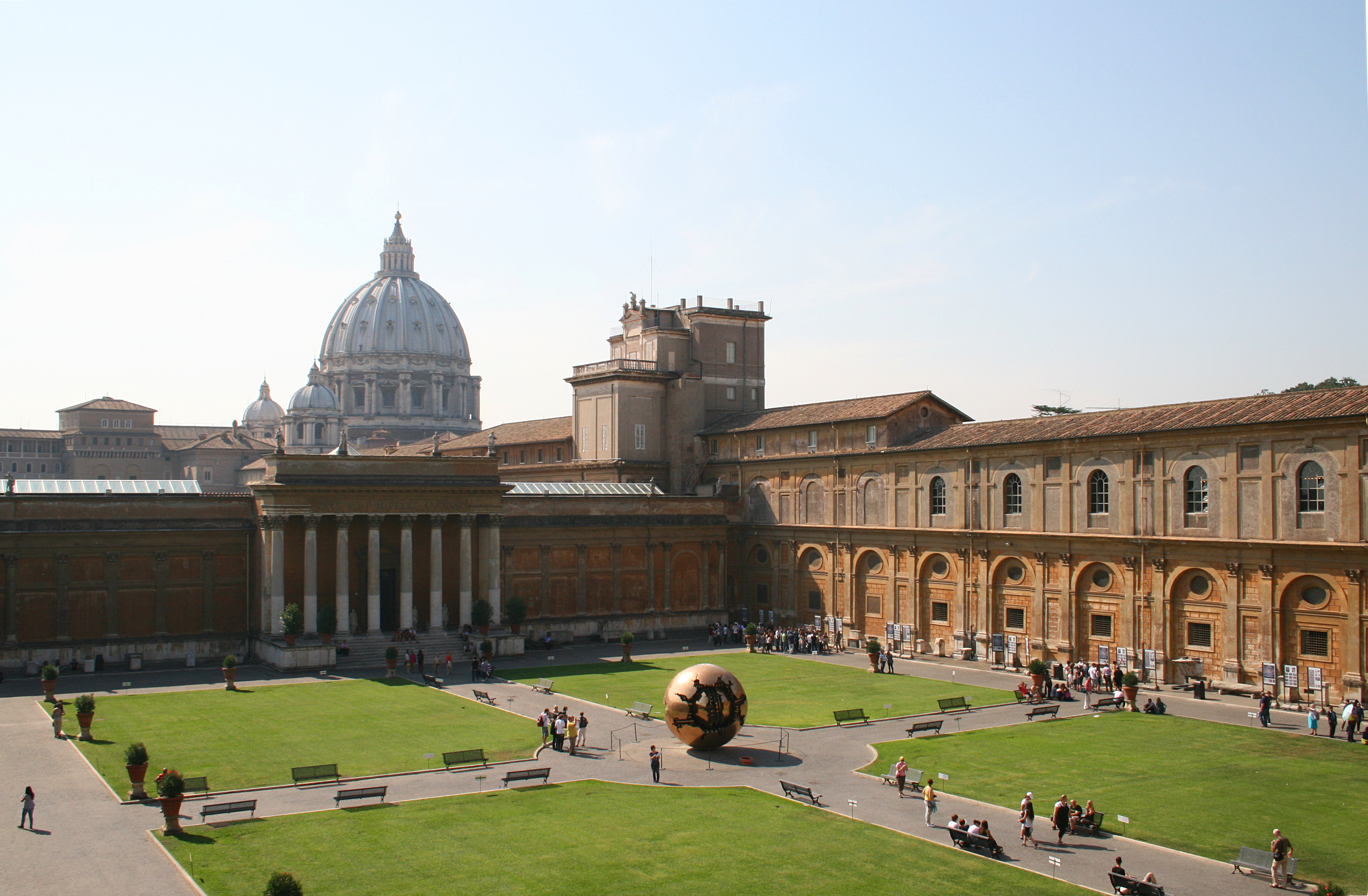
Vatican Museums from the Cortile della Pigna and the dome of St. Peter's

The Vatican Museums (Italian: Musei Vaticani; Latin: Musea Vaticana) are the public museums of the Vatican City. They display works from the immense collection amassed by the Catholic Church and the papacy throughout the centuries, including several of the best-known Roman sculptures and most important masterpieces of Renaissance art in the world. The museums contain roughly 70,000 works, of which 20,000 are on display, and currently employ 640 people who work in 40 different administrative, scholarly, and restoration departments.

Pope Julius II founded the museums in the early 16th century. The Sistine Chapel, with its ceiling and altar wall decorated by Michelangelo, and the Stanze di Raffaello (decorated by Raphael) are on the visitor route through the Vatican Museums, considered among the most canonical and distinctive works of Western and European art.

In 2024, the Vatican Museums were visited by 6.8 million people. They ranked second in the list of most-visited art museums and museums in the world after the Louvre.

There are 24 galleries, or rooms, in total, with the Sistine Chapel, notably, being the last room visited within the Museum.

== History ==
The Vatican Museums trace their origin to a single marble sculpture, purchased in the 16th century: Laocoön and His Sons was discovered on 14 January 1506, in a vineyard near the basilica of Santa Maria Maggiore in Rome. Pope Julius II sent Giuliano da Sangallo and Michelangelo, who were working at the Vatican, to examine the discovery. On their recommendation, the Pope immediately purchased the sculpture from the vineyard owner. The Pope put the sculpture, which represents the Trojan priest Laocoön and his two sons, Antiphantes and Thymbraeus being attacked by giant serpents, on public display at the Vatican exactly one month after its discovery.

Benedict XIV founded the Museum Christianum, and some of the Vatican collections formed the Lateran Museum, which Pius IX founded by decree in 1854.

The museums celebrated their 500th anniversary in October 2006 by permanently opening the excavations of a Vatican Hill necropolis to the public.

On 1 January 2017, Barbara Jatta became the Director of the Vatican Museums, replacing Antonio Paolucci who had been director since 2007.

== Pinacoteca Vaticana ==
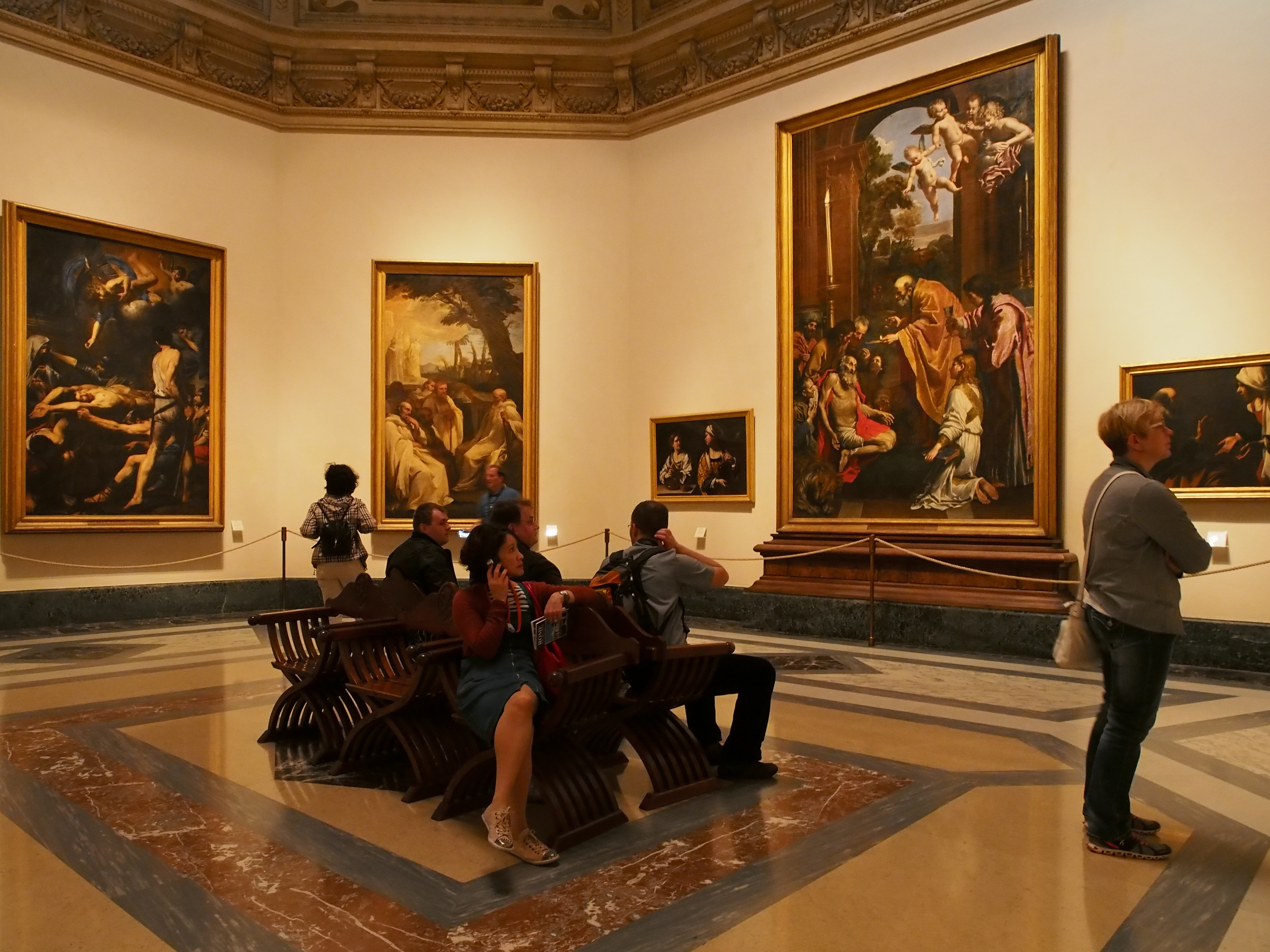
Tourists in the Pinacoteca Vaticana

The art gallery was housed in the Borgia Apartment until Pius XI ordered construction of a dedicated building. The new building, designed by Luca Beltrami, was inaugurated on 27 October 1932. The museum's paintings include:

- Giotto: Stefaneschi Triptych
- Olivuccio di Ciccarello: Opere di Misericordia
- Filippo Lippi: Marsuppini Coronation
- Giovanni Bellini: Pietà
- Melozzo da Forlì: Sixtus IV Appointing Platina as Prefect of the Vatican Library
- Pietro Perugino: Decemviri Altarpiece and San Francesco al Prato Resurrection
- Leonardo da Vinci: Saint Jerome in the Wilderness
- Raphael: Madonna of Foligno, Oddi Altarpiece and Transfiguration
- Titian: Frari Madonna
- Antonio da Correggio: Christ in Glory
- Paolo Veronese: The Vision of Saint Helena
- Caravaggio: The Entombment of Christ
- Domenichino, The Last Communion of Saint Jerome
- Nicolas Poussin, The Martyrdom of Saint Erasmus
- Jan Matejko: Sobieski at Vienna

== Collection of Modern Religious Art ==
The Collection of Modern Religious Art was added in 1973 and houses paintings and sculptures from such artists as Carlo Carrà, Giorgio de Chirico, Vincent van Gogh, Paul Gauguin, Marc Chagall, Paul Klee, Salvador Dalí, and Pablo Picasso.

== Sculpture museums ==
The group of museums includes several sculpture museums surrounding the Cortile del Belvedere. These are the Museo Gregoriano Profano, with classical sculpture, and others as below:

=== Museo Pio-Clementino ===
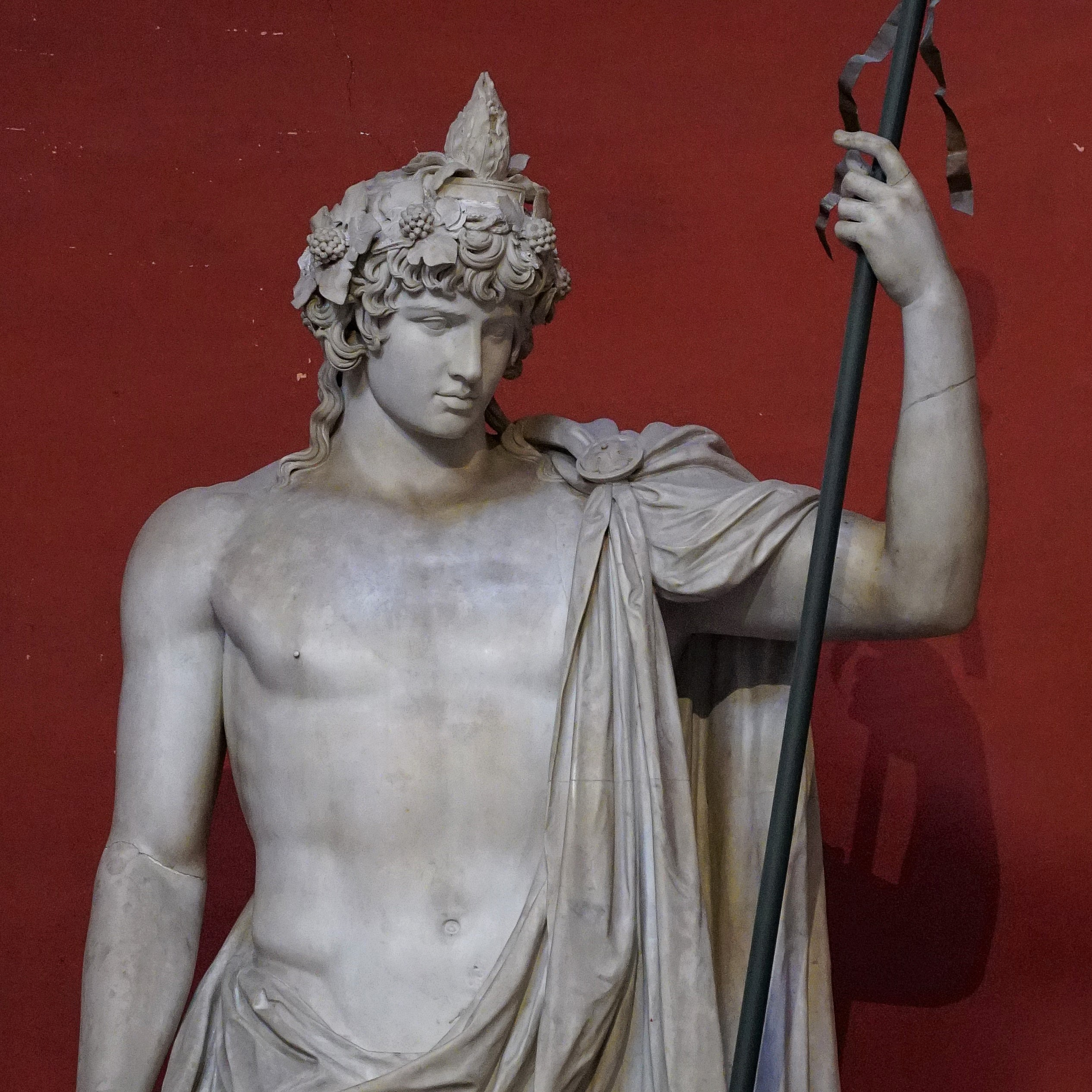
The Braschi Antinous is in the Sala Rotonda (Round Hall) of Pio-Clementine Museum.

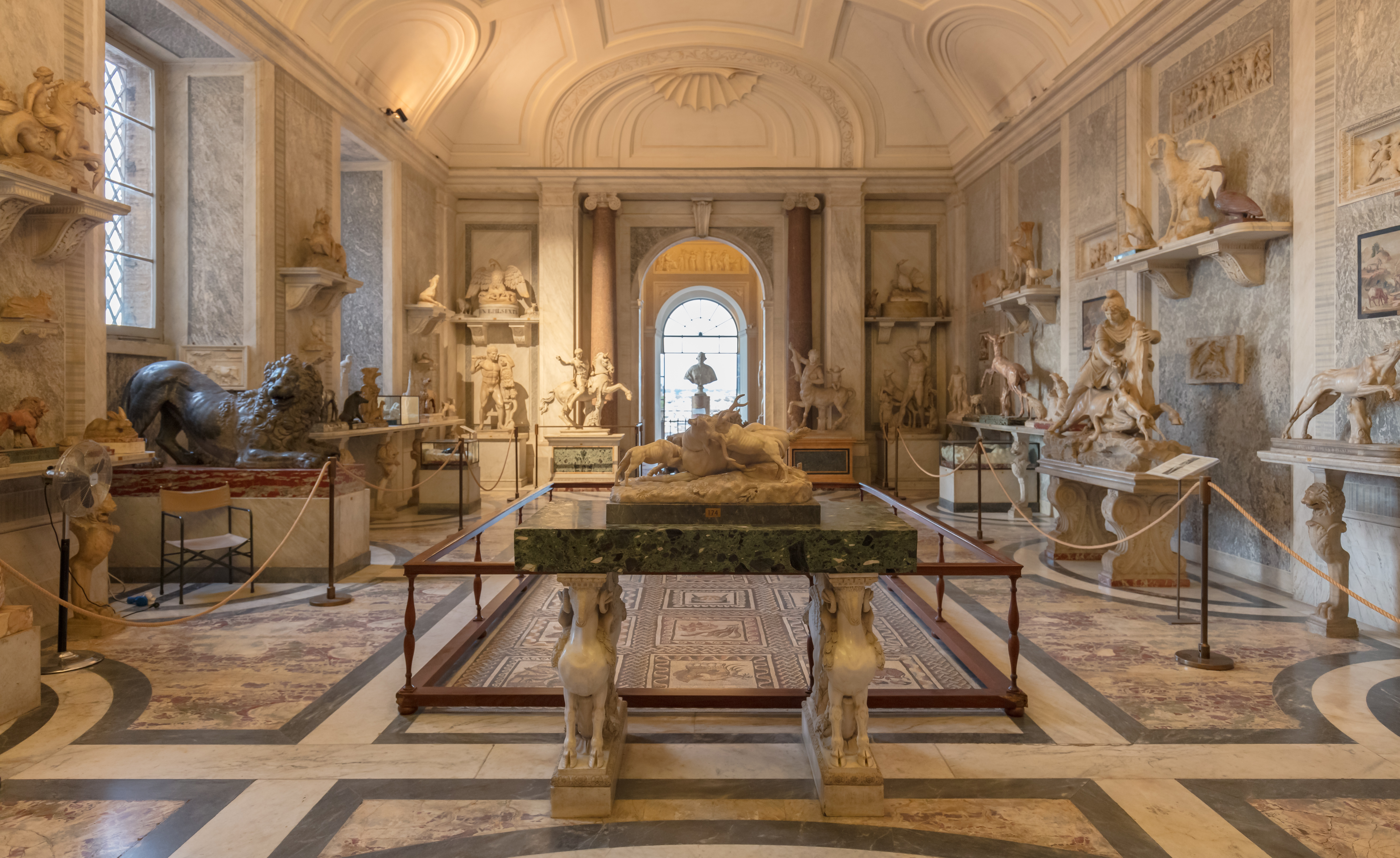
Hall of Animals, Pio-Clementino Museum

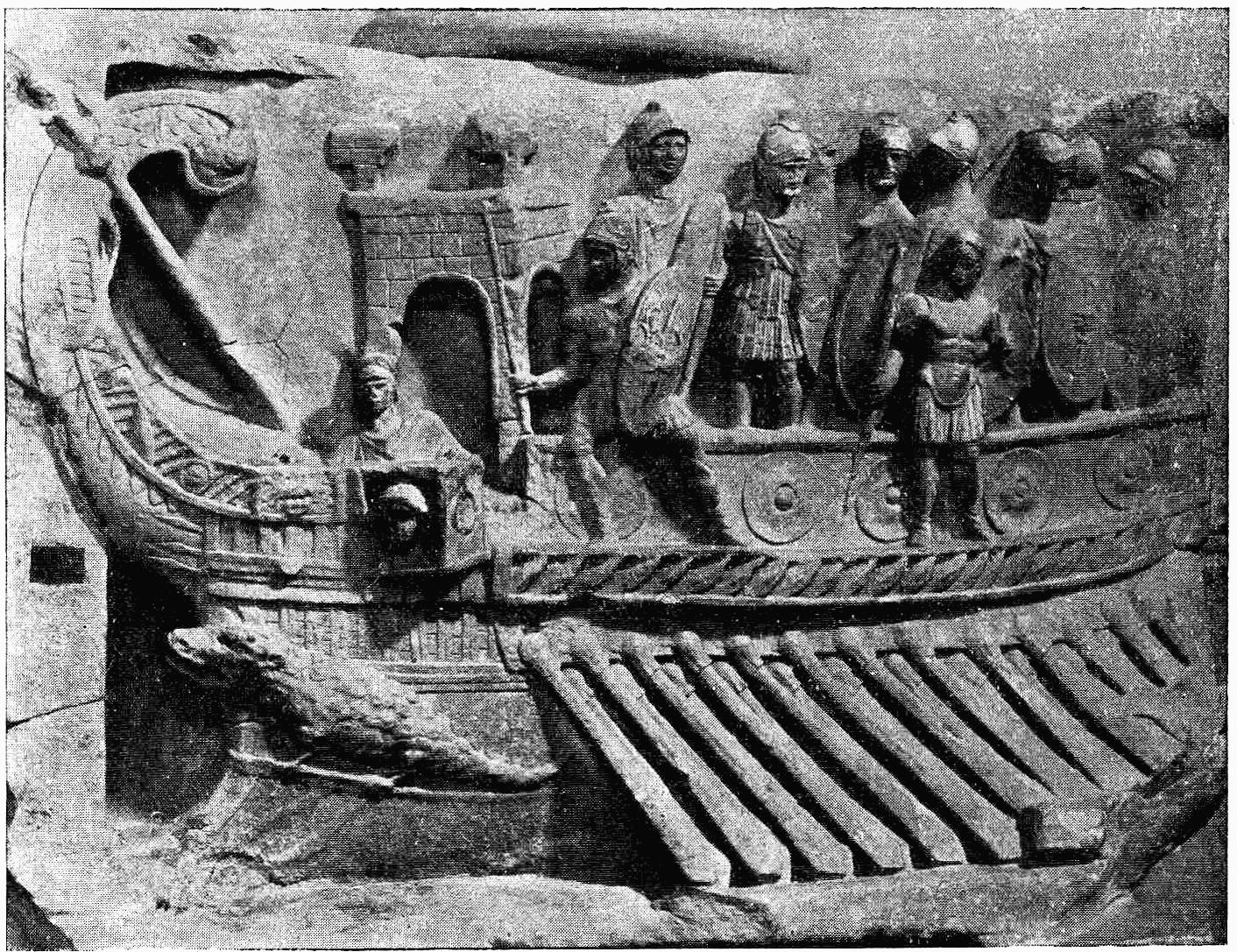
A Roman naval bireme depicted in a relief from the Temple of Fortuna Primigenia in Praeneste (Palestrina), constructed c. 120 BC; in the Museo Pio-Clementino

The museum takes its name from two popes: Clement XIV, who established the museum, and Pius VI, who brought it to completion. Clement XIV came up with the idea of creating a new museum in Innocent VIII's Belvedere Palace and started the refurbishment work.

Clement XIV founded the Museo Pio-Clementino in 1771; it originally contained artworks of antiquity and the Renaissance. The museum and collection were enlarged by Clement's successor Pius VI. Today, the museum houses works of Greek and Roman sculpture. Some notable galleries are as follows:

- Octagonal Court (aka Belvedere Courtyard and Cortile delle Statue): this was where some of the first ancient classical statues in the papal collections were first displayed. Some of the most famous pieces, the Apollo of the Belvedere and Laocoön and His Sons have been here since the early 1500s.
- Sala Rotonda: shaped like a miniature Pantheon, the room has ancient mosaics on the floors, and ancient statues lining the perimeter, including a gilded bronze statue of Hercules and the Braschi Antinous.
- Greek Cross Gallery (Sala a Croce Greca): with the porphyry sarcophagi of Constance and Saint Helena, mother of Constantine the Great.
- Gallery of the Statues (Galleria delle Statue): as its name implies, holds various important statues, including Sleeping Ariadne and the bust of Menander. It also contains the Barberini Candelabra.
- Gallery of the Busts (Galleria dei Busti) Many ancient busts are displayed.
- Cabinet of the Masks (Gabinetto delle Maschere). The name comes from the mosaic on the floor of the gallery, found in Villa Adriana, which shows ancient theater masks. Statues are displayed along the walls, including the Three Graces.
- Sala delle Muse: houses the statue group of Apollo and the nine muses, uncovered in a Roman villa near Tivoli in 1774, as well as statues by important ancient Greek or Roman sculptors. The centerpiece is the Belvedere Torso, revered by Michelangelo and other Renaissance men.
- Sala degli Animali: so named because of the many ancient statues of animals.

=== Museo Chiaramonti ===
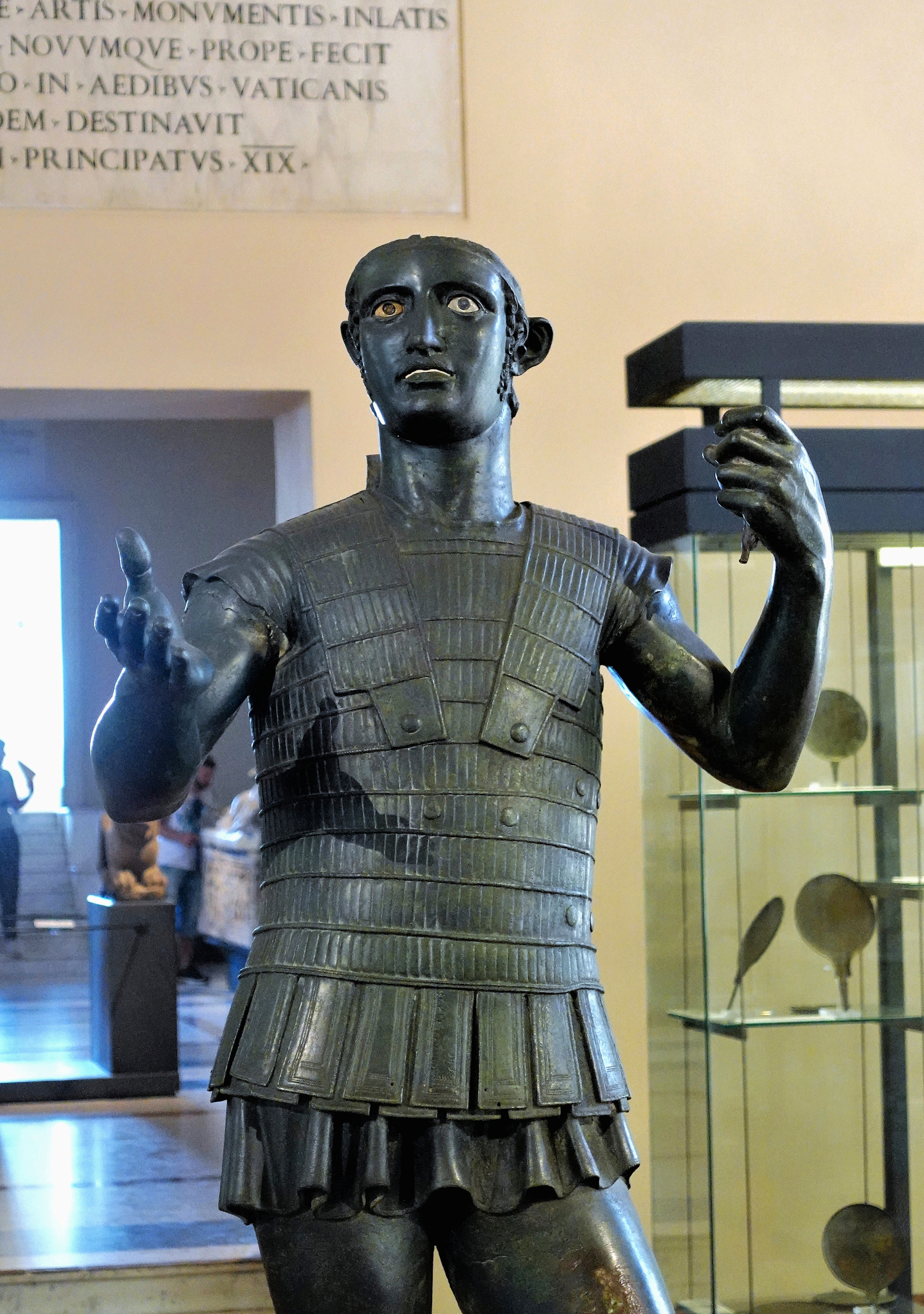
The Mars of Todi is an ancient Etruscan bronze statue from the late 400s BC; in the Gregorian Etruscan Museum.

This museum was founded in the early 19th century by Pius VII, whose surname before his election as Pope was Chiaramonti. The museum consists of a large arched gallery in which are exhibited several statues, sarcophagi and friezes. The New Wing, or Braccio Nuovo, built by Raffaele Stern, houses statues including the Augustus of Prima Porta, the Doryphoros, and The River Nile. It is in the Neoclassical style and has a wide arched roof with skylights. The Galleria Lapidaria forms part of the Museo Chiaramonti, and contains over 3,000 stone tablets and inscriptions. It is accessible only with special permission, usually for the purpose of academic study.

=== Museo Gregoriano Etrusco ===
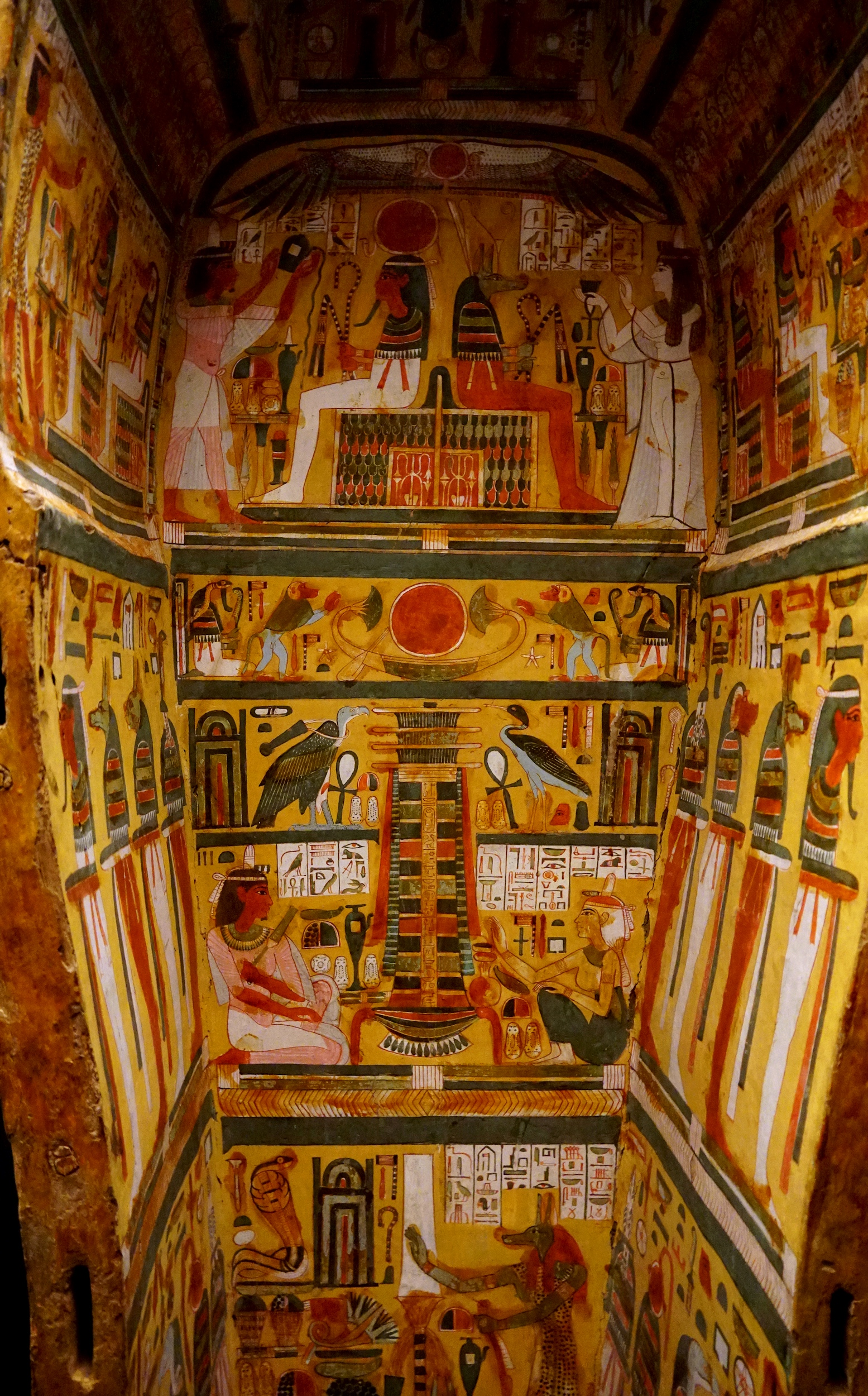
The inside of this Egyptian 'Yellow Coffin' Sarcophagus is filled with intricate iconic and textual symbols; in the Museo Gregoriano Egiziano.

Founded by Gregory XVI in 1837, this museum has nine galleries and houses Etruscan pieces, coming from archaeological excavations in the territory of the Papal State as well as other works already held in the Vatican. The collection include vases, sarcophagus, bronzes, terracotta, ceramics as well as works from the Falcioni and Guglielmi Collections.

=== Museo Gregoriano Egiziano ===
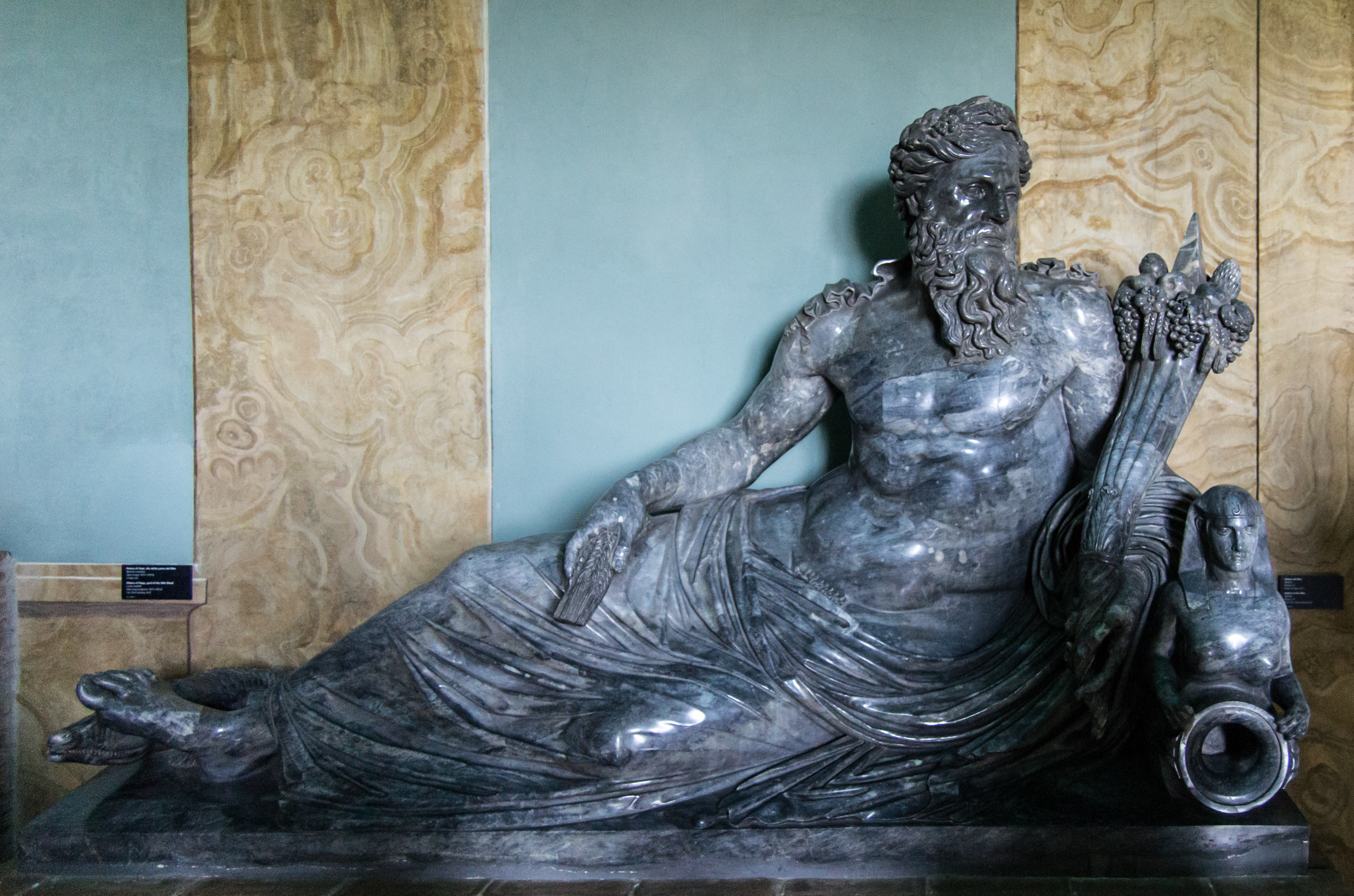
Statue of the Nile recumbent, 1st–2nd century AD; in the Museo Gregoriano Egiziano

The Museo Gregoriano Egiziano ("Gregorian Egyptian Museum") museum houses a large collection of artifacts from Ancient Egypt and also many Egyptian works of Roman production in nine rooms. The Carlo Grassi Collection of bronzes is part of the collection. Such material includes papyruses, sarcophagi, mummies, sculptures and reproductions of the Book of the Dead.

== Vatican Historical Museum ==
The Vatican Historical Museum (Italian: Museo storico vaticano) was founded in 1973 at the behest of Paul VI, and was initially hosted in environments under the Square Garden. In 1987, it moved to the main floor of the Lateran Palace, where it opened in March 1991.

== Highlights ==
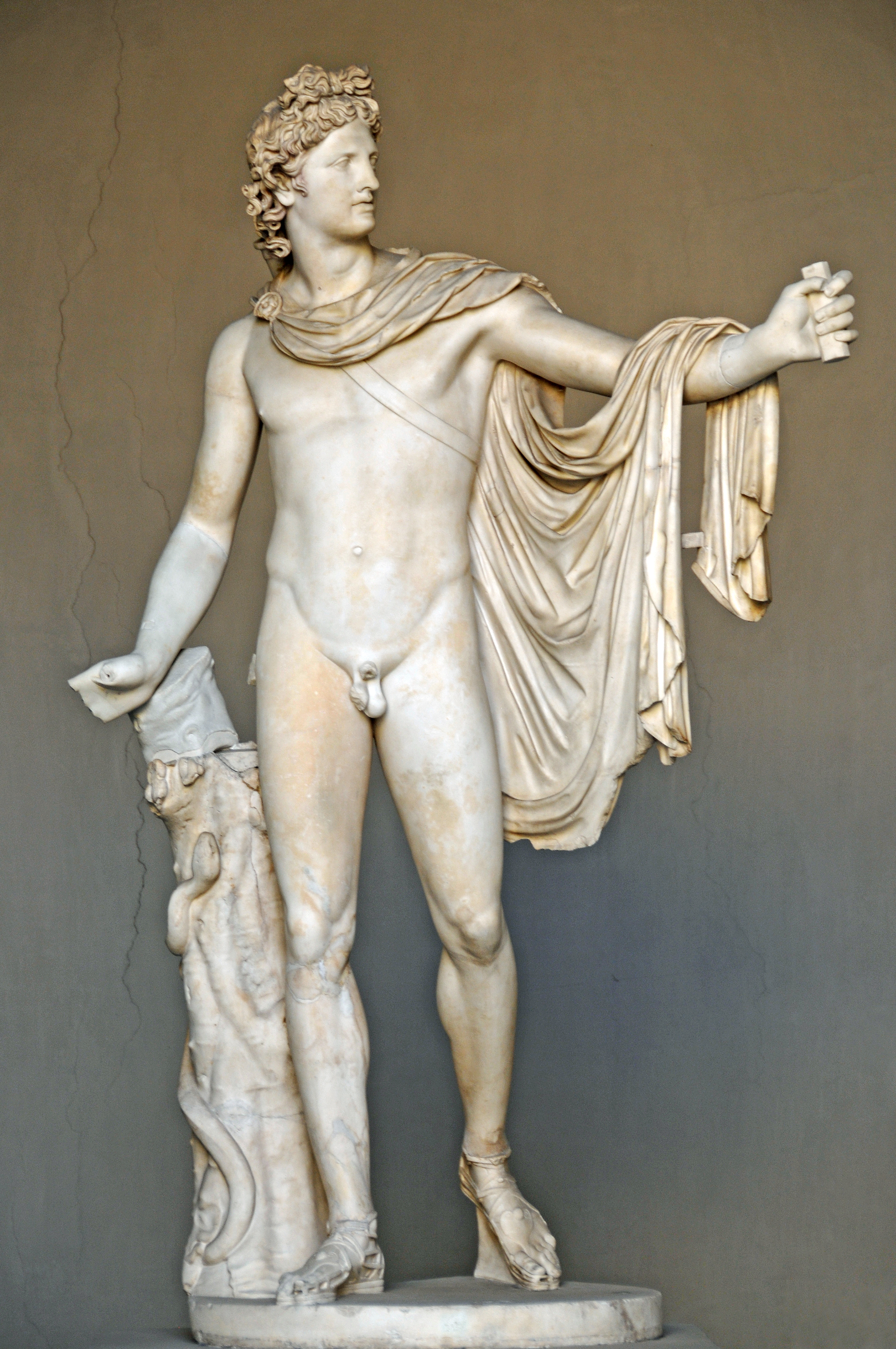
After Leochares
Apollo Belvedere
Museo Pio-Clementino

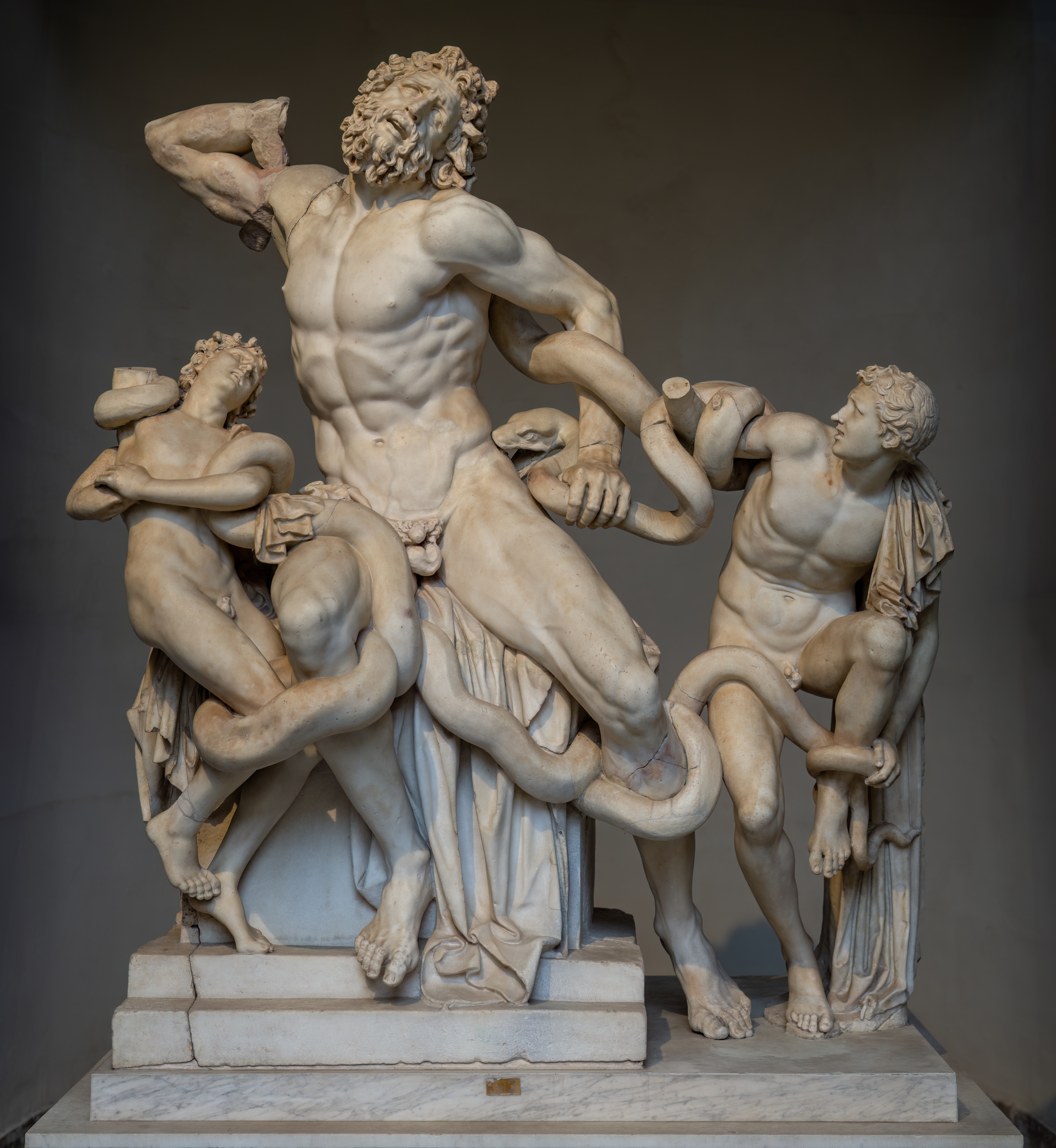
Agesander, Athenodorus and Polydorus
Laocoön and His Sons
Museo Pio-Clementino

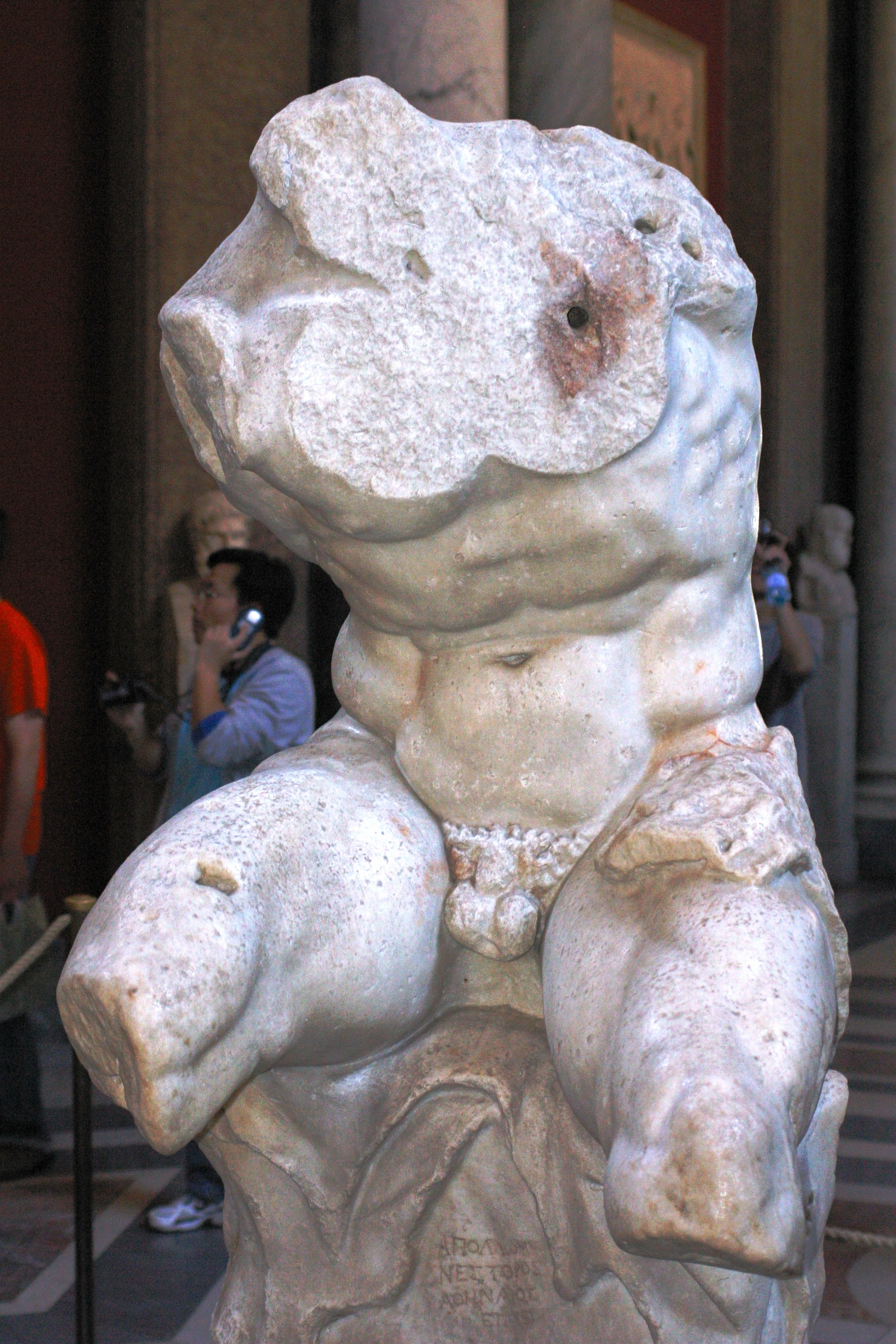
Apollonius
Belvedere Torso
Museo Pio-Clementino

Roman, 1st century AD
Augustus of Prima Porta
Museo Chiaramonti

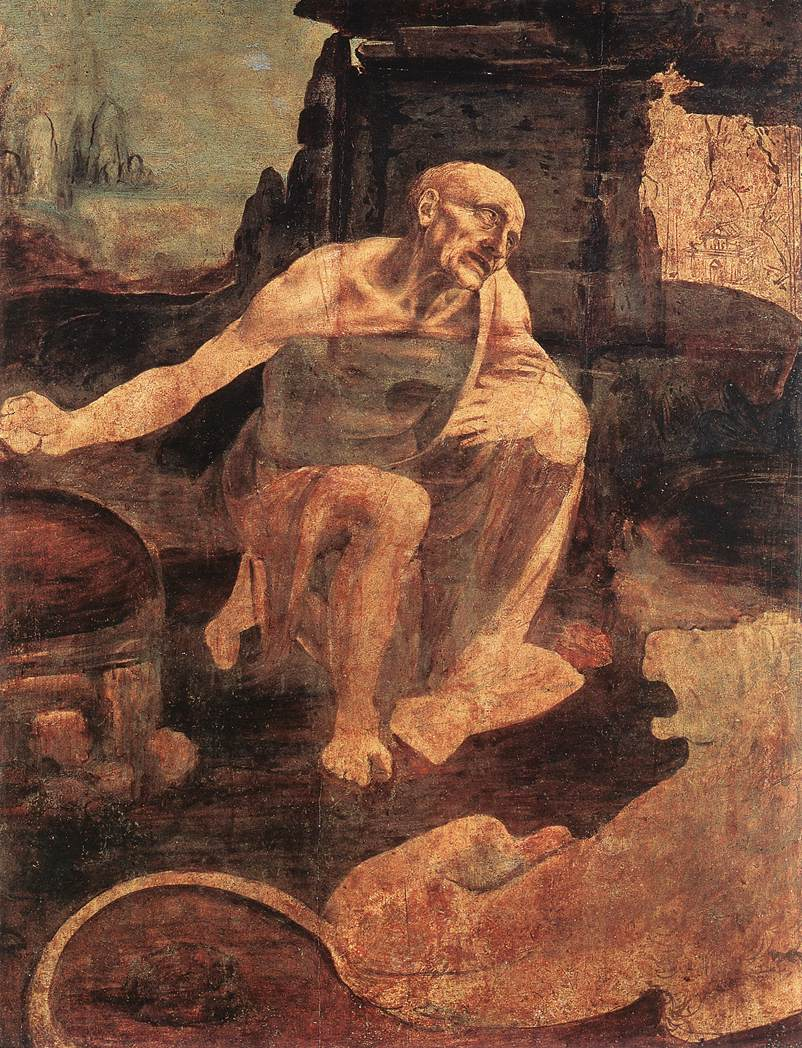
Leonardo da Vinci
Saint Jerome in the Wilderness
Pinacoteca Vaticana

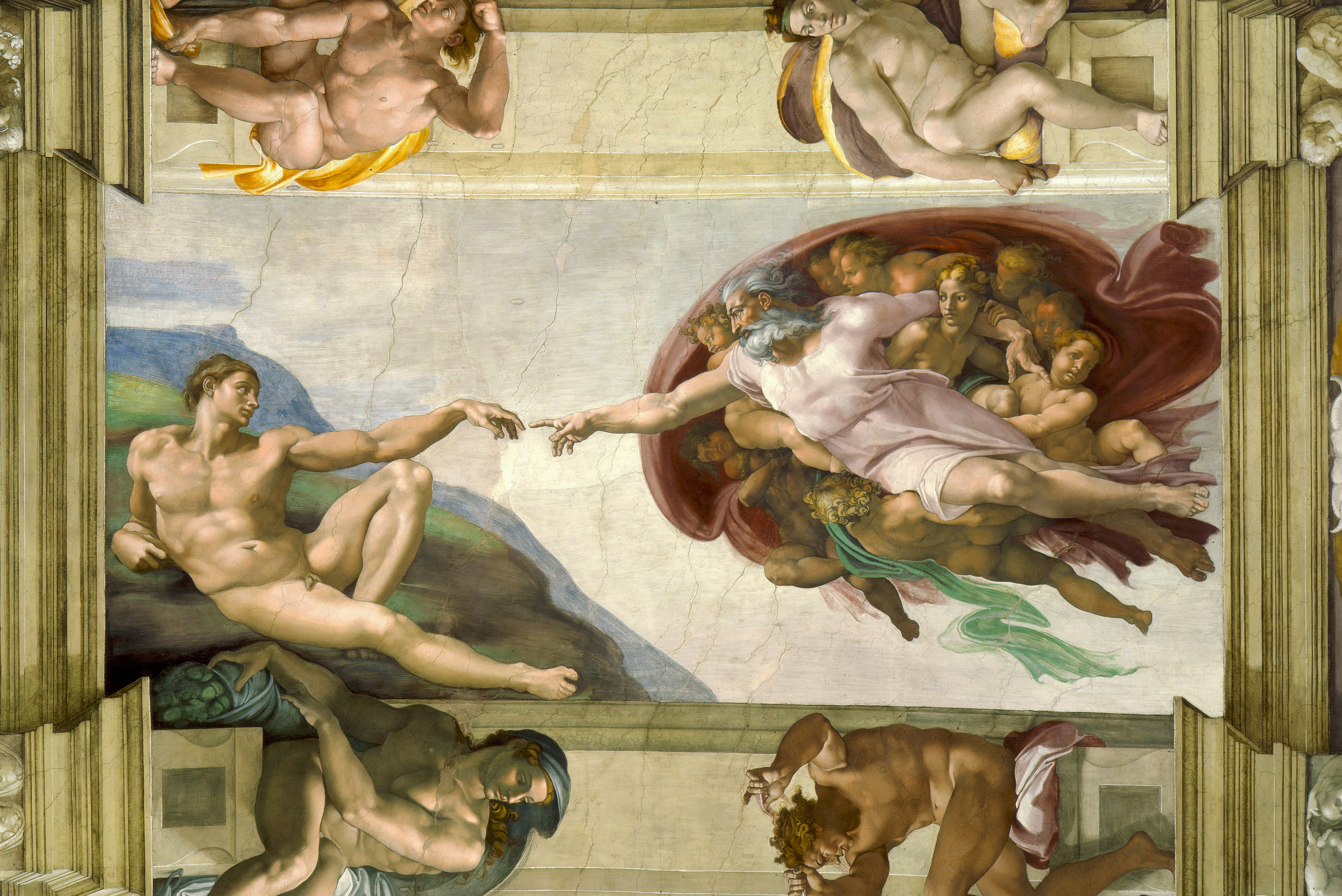
Michelangelo
The Creation of Adam
Sistine Chapel (ceiling)

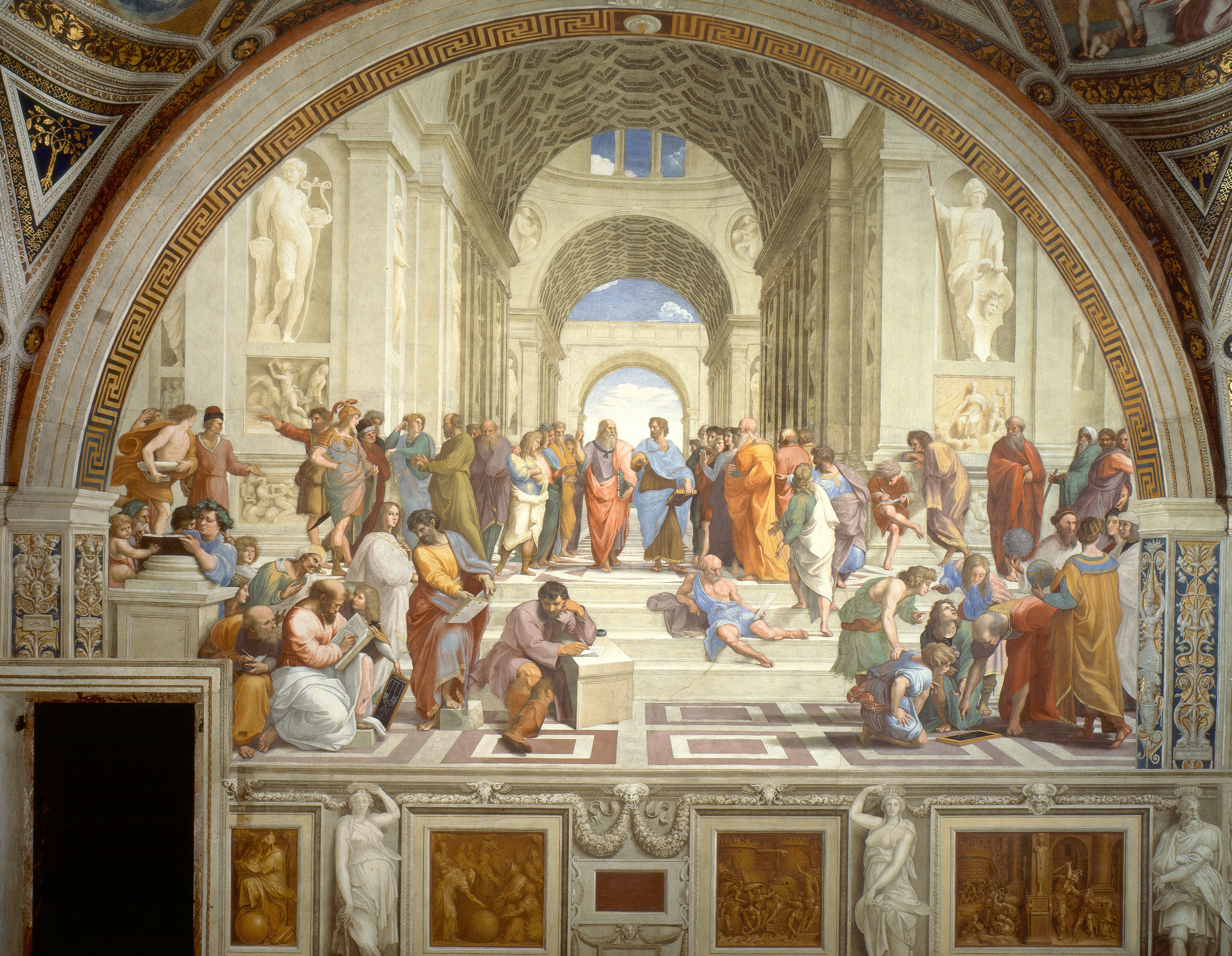
Raphael
The School of Athens
Raphael Rooms

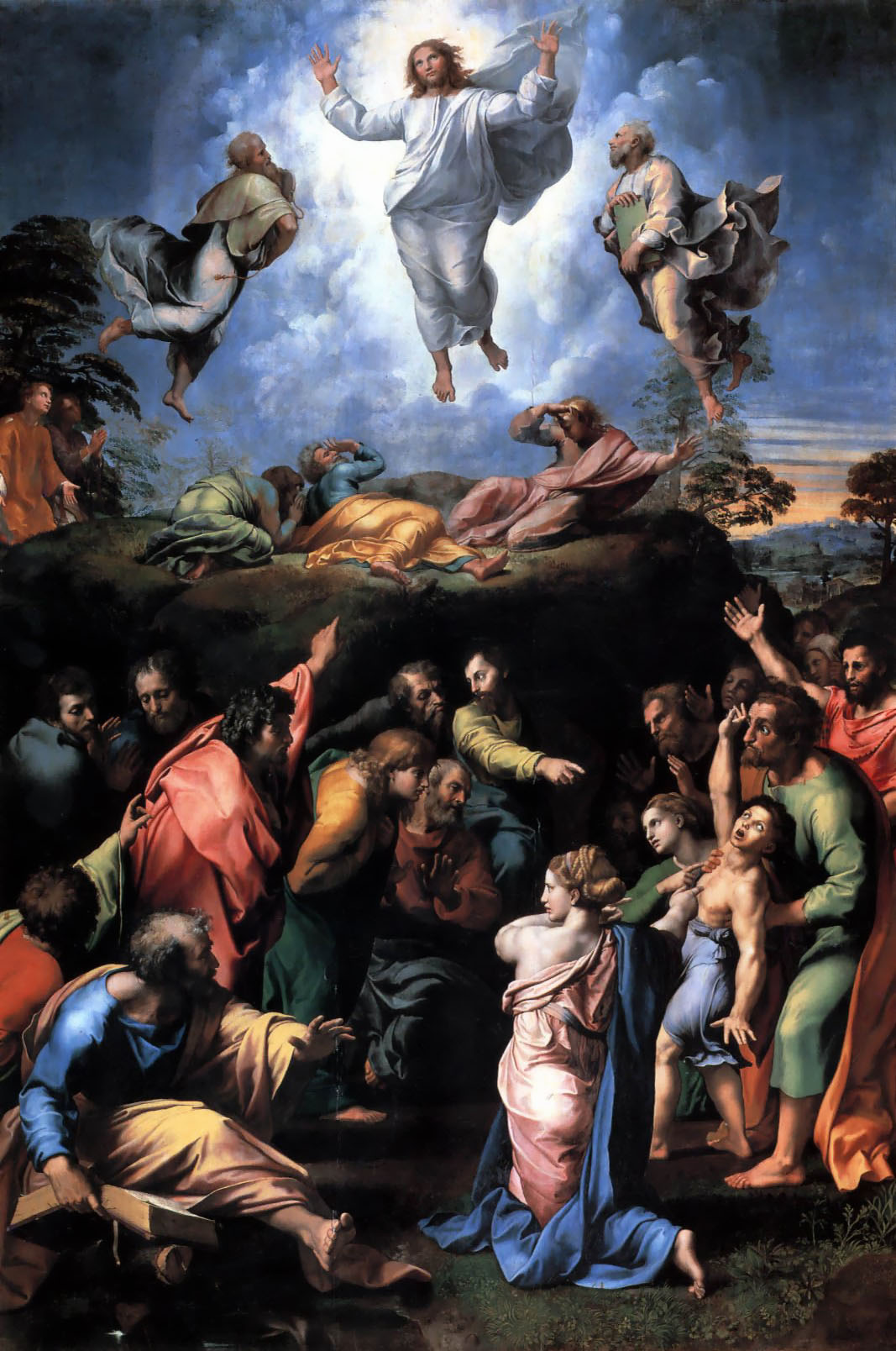
Raphael
The Transfiguration
Pinacoteca Vaticana

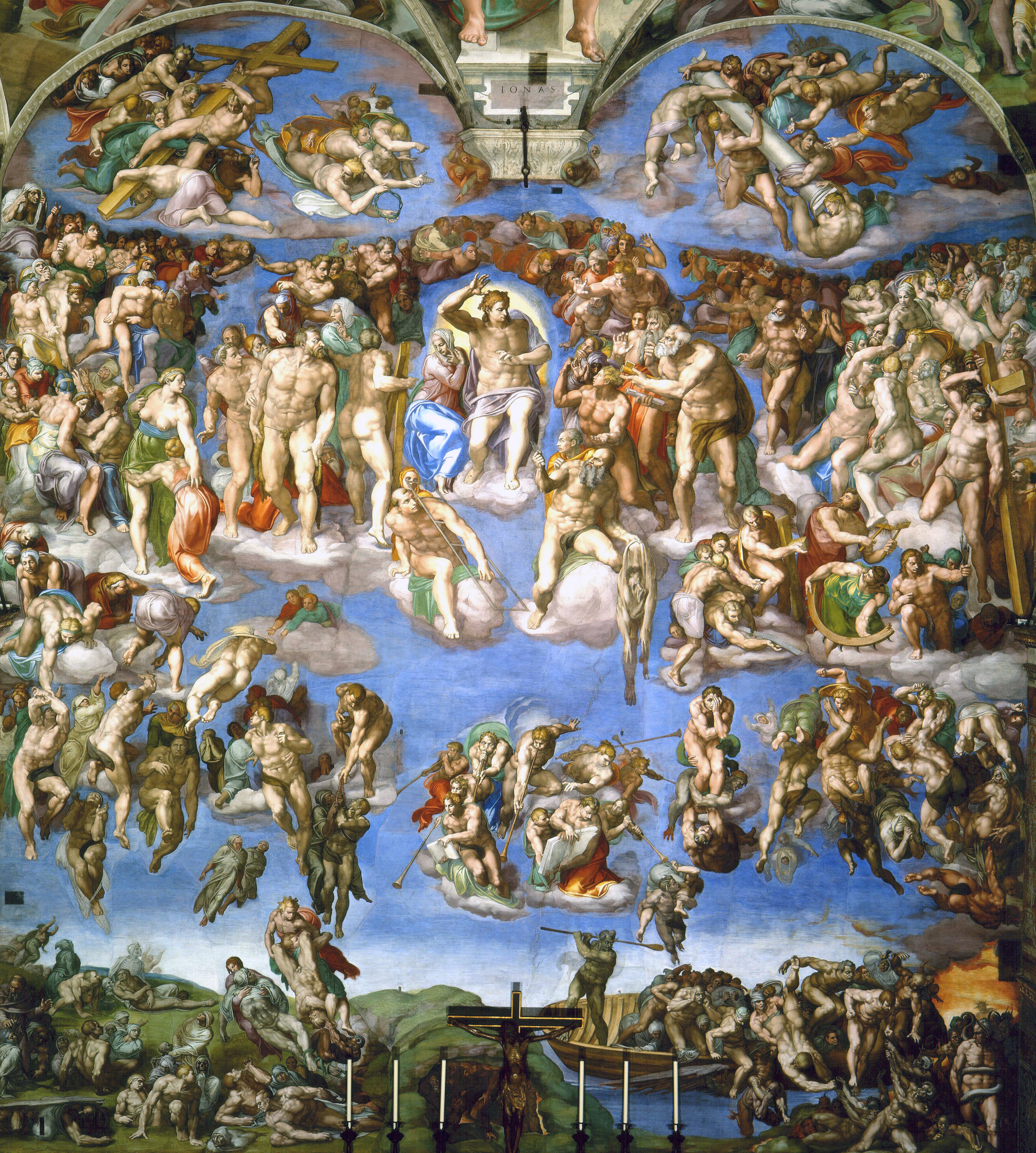
Michelangelo
The Last Judgment
Sistine Chapel

Caravaggio
The Entombment of Christ
Pinacoteca Vaticana

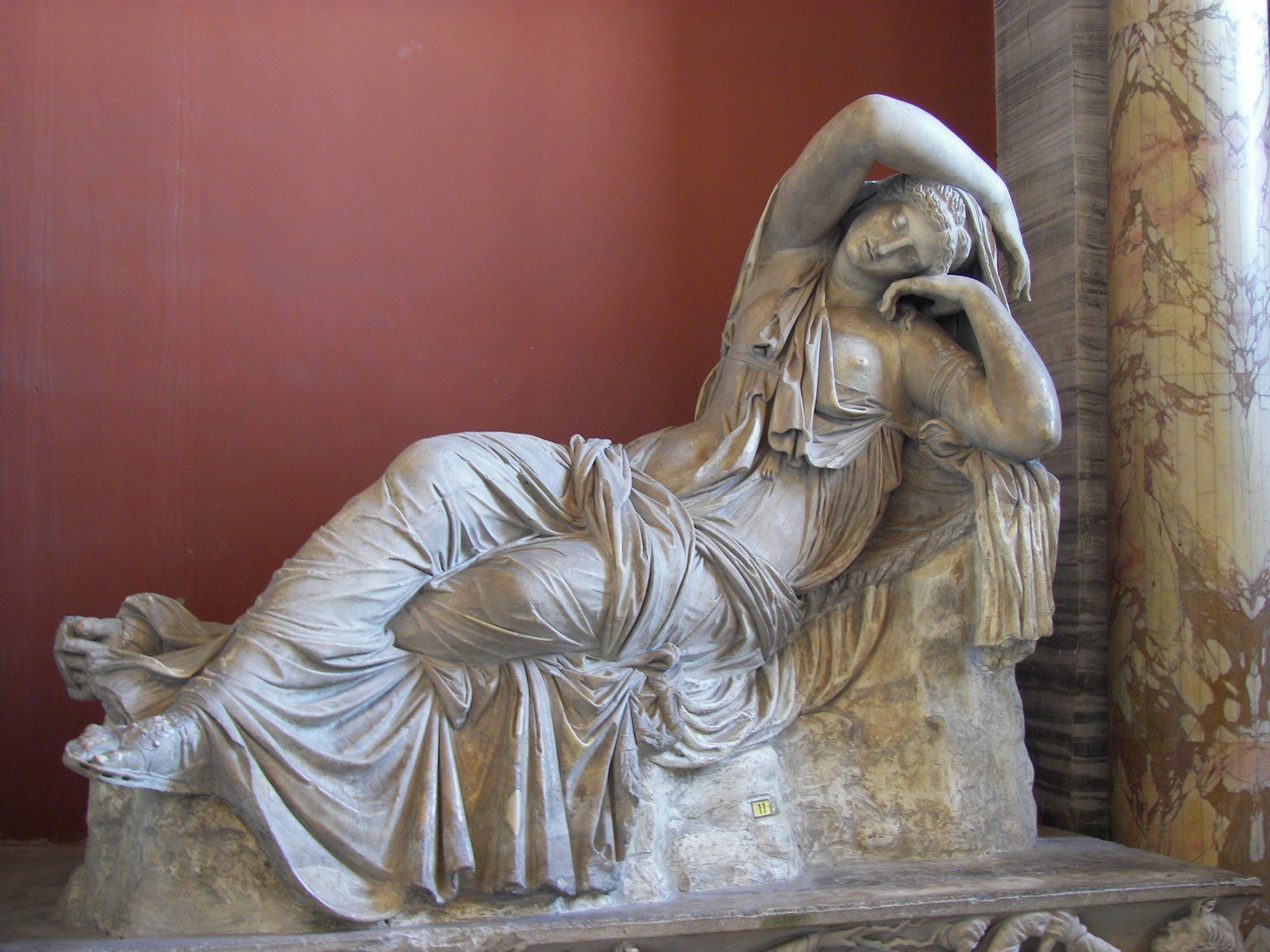
Sleeping Ariadne
Galleria delle Statue

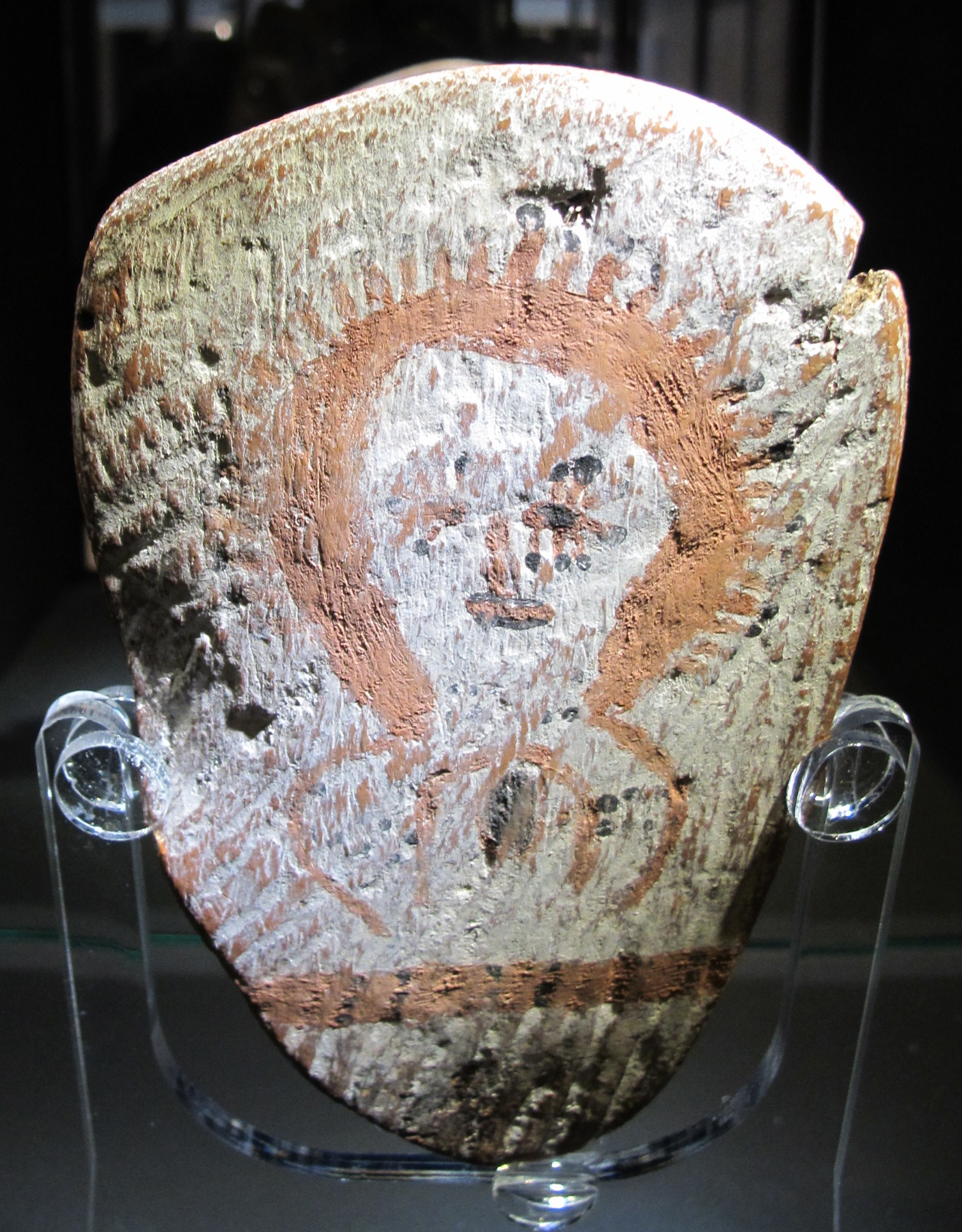
Walcott Inlet area, Western Australia
Depiction of Wandjina
Anima Mundi

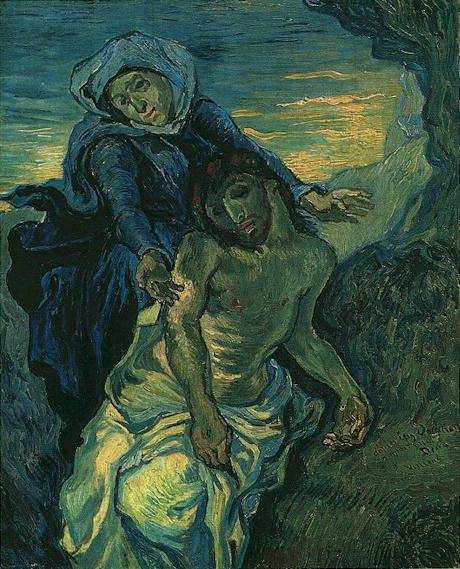
Vincent van Gogh – Pietà

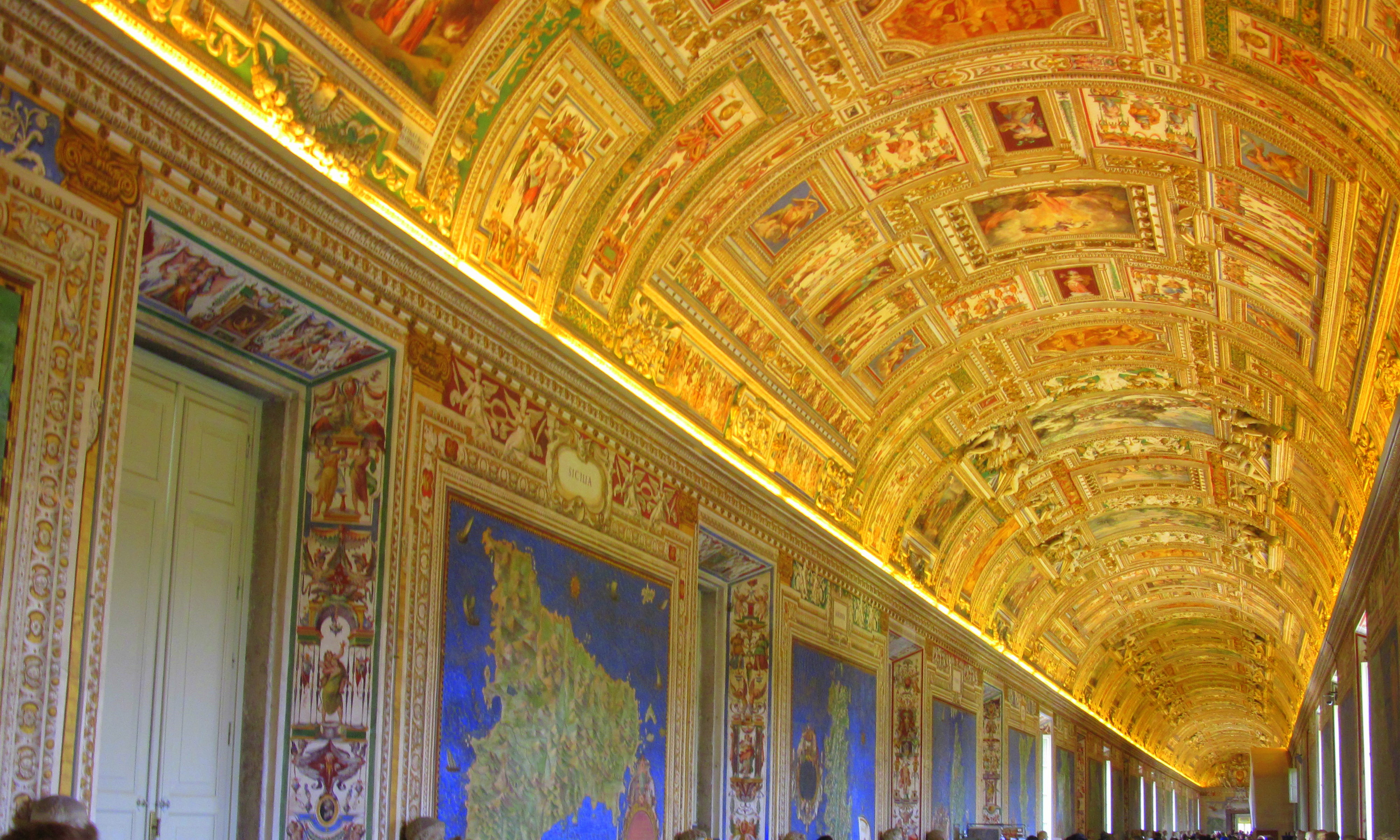
Gallery of Maps

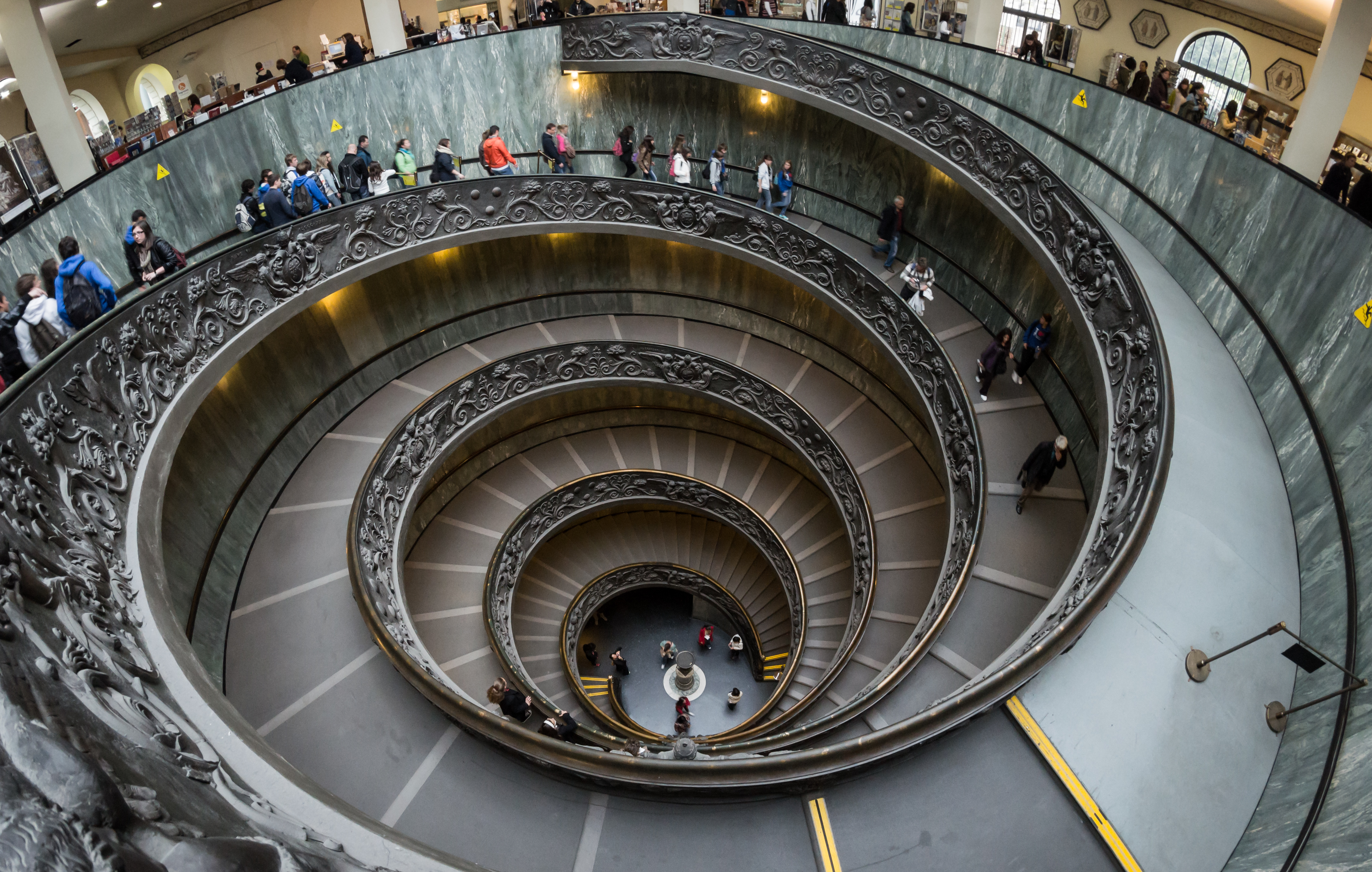
Bramante Staircase; spiral stairs of the Vatican Museums, designed by Giuseppe Momo in 1932

- The red marble papal throne, formerly in the Basilica of Saint John Lateran.
- Roman sculpture, tombstones, and inscriptions, including the Early Christian Sarcophagus of Junius Bassus and Dogmatic sarcophagus, and the epitaph of Lucius Cornelius Scipio Barbatus.
- The Raphael Rooms with many works by Raphael and his workshop, including the masterpiece The School of Athens (1509–1511).
- The Niccoline Chapel.
- The Sistine Chapel, including the Sistine Chapel ceiling (gallery).
- The Gallery of Maps: topographical maps of the whole of Italy, painted on the walls by friar Ignazio Danti of Perugia, commissioned by Gregory XIII (1572–1585). It remains the world's largest pictorial geographical study.
- The frescoes and other works in the Borgia Apartment built for the Borgia pope Alexander VI.
- The Bramante Staircase is a double spiral staircase designed by Giuseppe Momo in 1932. The staircase has two parts, a double helix, and is of shallow incline, being a stepped ramp rather than a true staircase. It encircles the outer wall of a stairwell about fifteen metres (49 feet) wide and with a clear space at the centre. The balustrade around the ramp is of ornately worked metal.

== Visitors ==
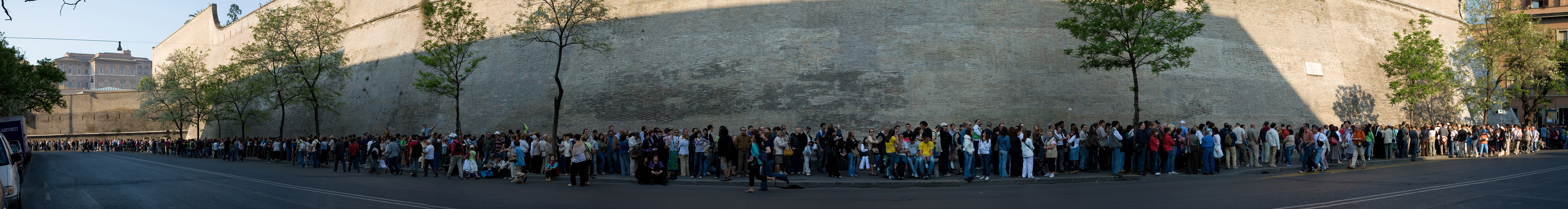
On the last Sunday of each month, the Vatican Museum is open to the public for free. It is popular and common for people to wait in line for many hours. The other days of the week tickets are available online or in person. This image is a panoramic view of one small stretch of the entire queue on Sunday 29 April 2007, which continues for some distance in both directions beyond view.

== Incidents ==
On 18 August 2022, two members of the climate activist group Ultima Generazione glued themselves to the marble base of the Laocoon statue and unfurled a banner calling for an end to fossil fuels while a third member filmed them. Conservationists said that the act resulted in permanent damage to the sculpture, with restoration works costing 3,148 euros. A Vatican court subsequently sentenced the three to a nine-month suspended prison sentence and fines of up to 28,000 euros ($30,000).

On 5 October 2022, an American tourist was arrested after hurling a Roman bust at the Chiaramonti Museum and damaging another bust. Il Messaggero reported that the man damaged the artefacts in anger after he was informed that he could not have an audience with Pope Francis as part of his vacation wish. The museum's press director Matteo Alessandrini said one bust lost part of a nose and an ear, while the other was knocked off its pedestal. Conservation and repair works on the sculptures were estimated to cost 15,000 euros ($14,800 US) and took about 300 hours to be completed.

== See also ==
- Index of Vatican City–related articles
- List of largest art museums
- List of most visited art museums
- List of museums in Rome
- Michelangelo Simonetti
