= Marsuppini Coronation =

Painting by Filippo Lippi

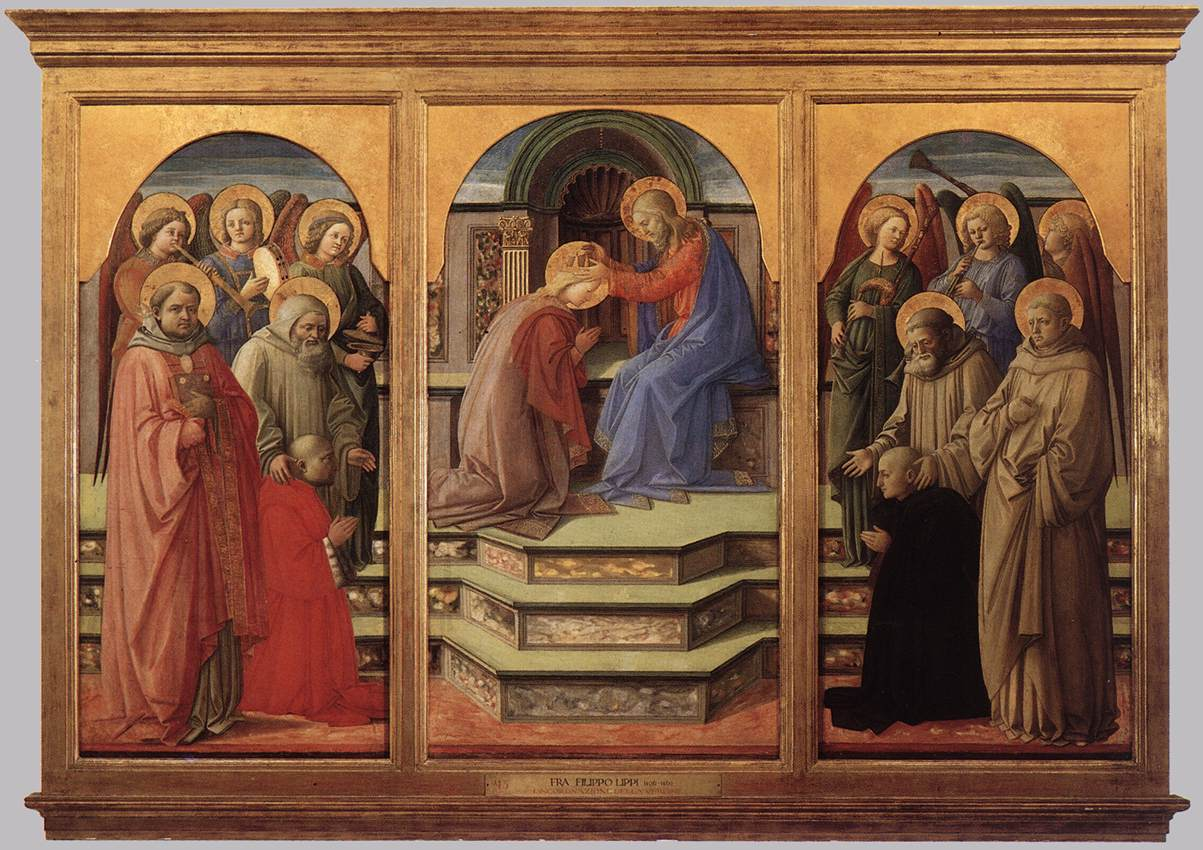
- Artist: Filippo Lippi
- Year: after 1444
- Medium: Tempera on panel
- Dimensions: 172 cm × 251 cm (68 in × 99 in)
- Location: Vatican Museums, Rome

The Marsuppini Coronation is a painting of the Coronation of the Virgin by the Italian Renaissance painter Filippo Lippi, dating to after 1444. It is in the Pinacoteca Vaticana, Rome.

== History ==
The panel was commissioned by the chancellor of the Republic of Florence, Carlo Marsuppini, for the Saint Bernard Chapel in the eponymous church at Arezzo. His father Gregorio, to whom it would be dedicated, had died in 1444, and thus the work must date to that year or later, up to c. 1460.

The work remained in Arezzo until 1785, when the monastery which owned the church was suppressed. It was subsequently split into three parts and sold to privates, and was later acquired by Pope Gregory XVI. Thenceforth it has been in the Art Gallery of the Vatican Museums.

== Description ==
The panel has a sober and archaic style, similar to that of Fra Angelico. It is divided into three sections. The central one, on his podium with steps and framed by a shell-shaped niche, is the scene of the coronation of Mary: she is kneeling at the feet of Christ, who puts the crown on his head. At the sides are two symmetrical compositions of three musician angels and two standing saints in the foreground. The latter, who are connected to the monastic orders, are presenting the two donors, Gregorio Marsuppini and his son Carlo, both kneeling.

The musician angels were executed (at least partly) by assistants.
