= John Skippe =

English wood-engraver

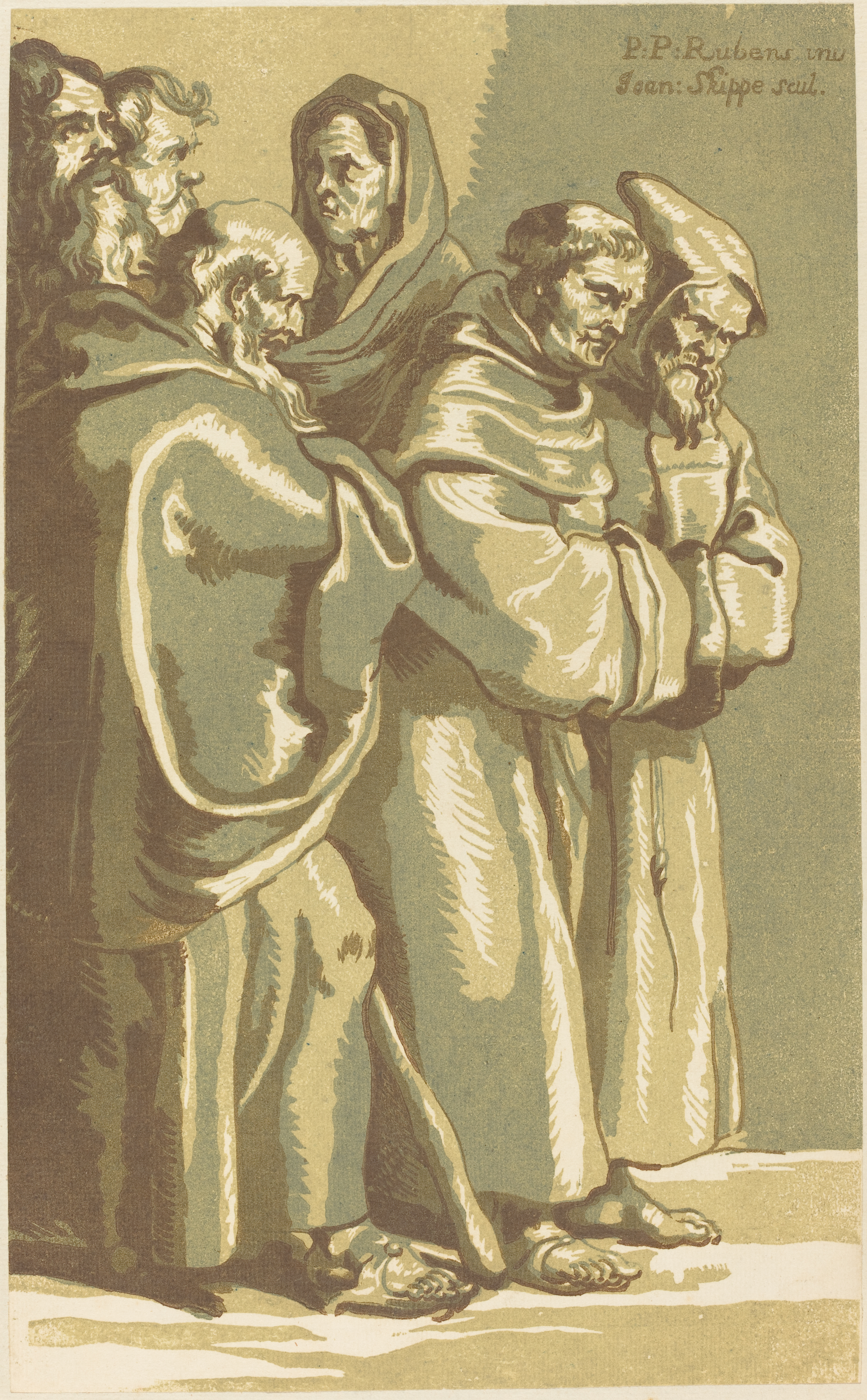
A Group of Monks and a Woman (after Rubens; 1780s)

John Skippe or Skipp (1741–1812) was an English amateur artist.

== Life ==
John Skipp, born on 7 July 1741, was the son of John Skipp of Upper Hall, Ledbury, Herefordshire. His family had long been settled at Ledbury, a J. Skipp of that place having supported Sir Henry Lingen in 1646. He matriculated at Merton College, Oxford, in 1760, at the age of eighteen.

After leaving the university he travelled in North Italy, and made many drawings, not without merit, from the old masters. A series of careful studies, done in 1773 from the frescoes by Andrea Mantegna in the Church of the Eremitani at Padua, is in the print-room of the British Museum.

Skippe is chiefly noted for his series of woodcuts in chiaroscuro, done in imitation of those works of Ugo da Carpi and other early Italian artists. He had probably seen the chiaroscuro woodcuts of John Baptist Jackson. Drawings by Skippe of landscape, sacred, and other subjects, executed in bistre with some vigour, are occasionally met within collections, and were in the nineteenth century sometimes attributed to the old masters.

Skippe died unmarried on 14 October 1812.
