= Madonna of Foligno =

Painting by Raphael

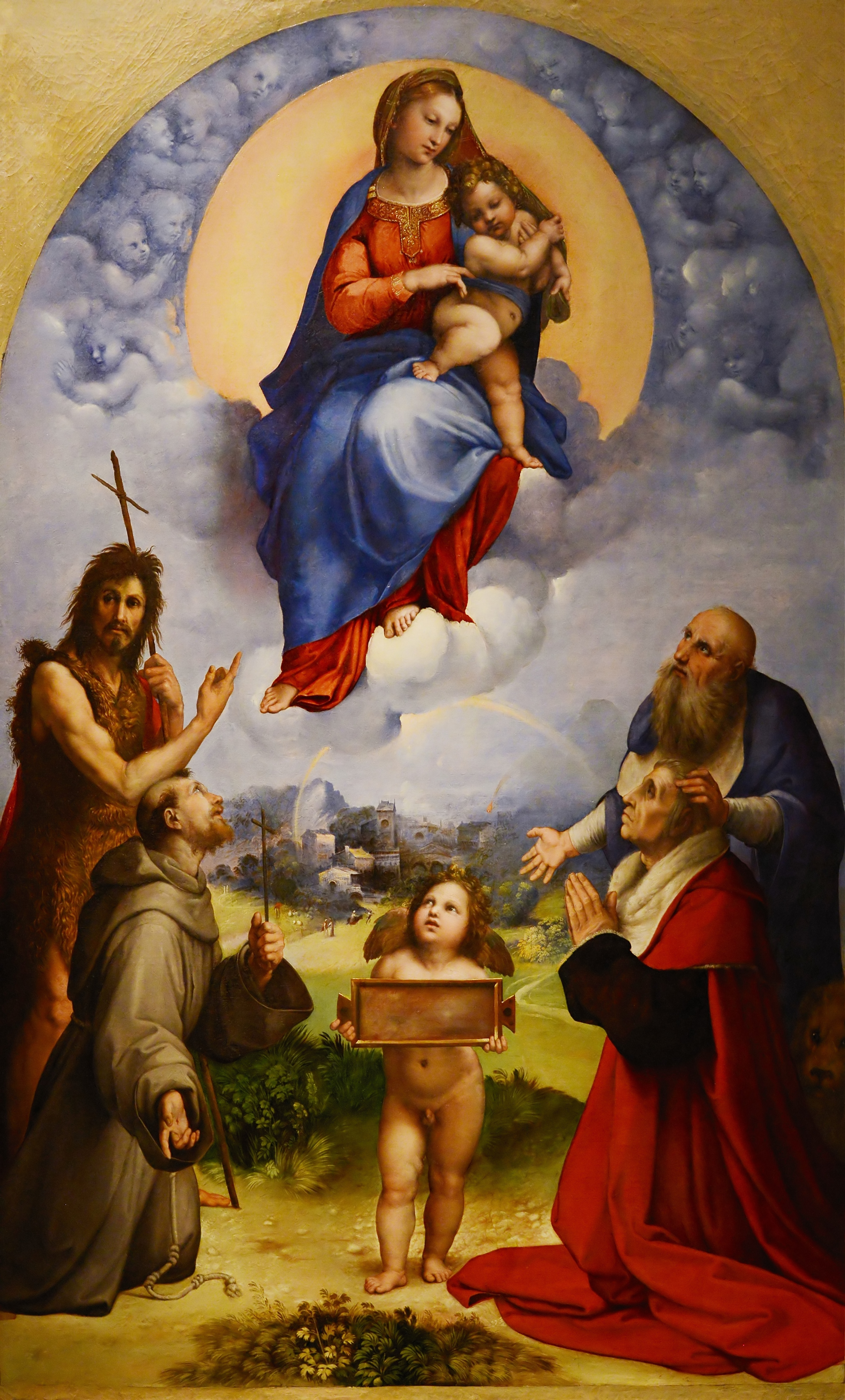
- Artist: Raphael
- Year: c. 1511–1512
- Medium: Oil on wood, transferred to canvas
- Dimensions: 320 cm × 194 cm (130 in × 76 in)
- Location: Pinacoteca Vaticana, Vatican City

The Madonna of Foligno is a painting by the Italian High Renaissance painter Raphael, executed c. 1511–1512. First painted on wood panel, it was later transferred to canvas.

== History ==
The painting was executed for Sigismondo de' Conti, chamberlain to Pope Julius II. It was placed on the high altar of Santa Maria in Aracoeli on the Capitoline Hill in Rome, the church in which Sigismondo was buried in 1512.

It was moved by Anna Conti, a descendant of Sigismondi de' Conti, to the monastery of St. Anne in Foligno in 1565, and remained there for more than two centuries, hence the name.

In 1799 it was one of many paintings which Napoleon ordered moved to Paris. There, in 1802, the painting was transferred from panel to canvas by François-Toussaint Hacquin and restored by Mathias Barthélémy Röser of Heidelberg. A note was made by the restorer: "Rapporto dei cittadini Guijon Vincent Tannay e Berthollet sul ristauro dei quadri di Raffaello conosciuto sotto il nome di Madonna di Foligno."

In 1815, after the Battle of Waterloo, the painting was returned to the Papal States where it was allocated to the Pinacoteca Vaticana of the Vatican Museum. It was hung in the same room as Raphael's Transfiguration.

== Description ==
The painting is a sacra conversazione, where holy figures seem to be in conversation and draw the audience into their discussion. Rather than sitting under a canopy, of the Umbrian or Florentine style, the Virgin is seated on clouds, embracing Jesus, while surrounded by angels. They look down upon Sigismondo de' Conti, kneeling in a red, fur-lined cape. Conti is presented by St. Jerome on the right with his lion, appealing for the Virgin's protection. On the left are the kneeling St. Francis of Assisi and St. John the Baptist, who is standing and wearing a tunic of skins. As St. John points to Jesus, he clearly looks out to us, pulling us in, while St. Francis points to us and looks at the Christ Child. Between the men is an angel, linking the saints of earth to the Heavenly host. Behind them are the towers of Foligno.

Painted during Raphael's Roman period, it is a testament to his artistic maturity, evidenced in the painting's composition, coloring and form.

Conti commissioned the painting to commemorate his survival of a shell that exploded near him during the Siege of Foligno, his hometown. He credited his safety to heavenly intervention. According to the historian Massimo Polidoro, this painting has been used by UFO websites as evidence of a flying saucer crash. Polidoro states that the house of Sigismondo Conti and a fireball are visible in the painting, and that painters at this time used "symbolic meanings that were anything but random". The angel is holding a sign with nothing written on it; according to Polidoro this was because Sigismondo died before he could tell Raphael what "thank you" to the Virgin he wanted written on the sign. Polidoro describes the UFO explanation as "reinterpreting with the eyes of twenty-first-century Europeans the product of other cultures".

== See also ==
- List of paintings by Raphael
- Gozzi Altarpiece
