= Michelangelo Simonetti =

Italian Neoclassical architect

- Born: 5 May 1731; Rome, Papal States
- Died: 13 May 1787 (aged 56); Rome, Papal States
- Occupation: Architect
- Movement: Neoclassicism
- Buildings: Museo Pio-Clementino

Michelangelo Simonetti (5 May 1731 – 13 May 1787) was an Italian Neoclassical architect.

== Biography ==
Michelangelo Simonetti was born in Rome in 1724. He studied architecture with Mauro Fontana, the nephew of Carlo Fontana. His most important work was the building of most of the Museo Pio-Clementino in the Vatican under the direction of Giovanni Battista Visconti, who had replaced Johann Joachim Winckelmann as Commissioner of Antiquities in Rome in 1768.

For Pope Clement XIV Simonetti continued the remodelling of the interior décor of the Casino of Innocent VIII, begun in 1771 by Alessandro Dori. He also redesigned the Cortile Ottagono, situated between the casino and Pirro Ligorio's nicchione in Donato Bramante's Cortile del Belvedere.

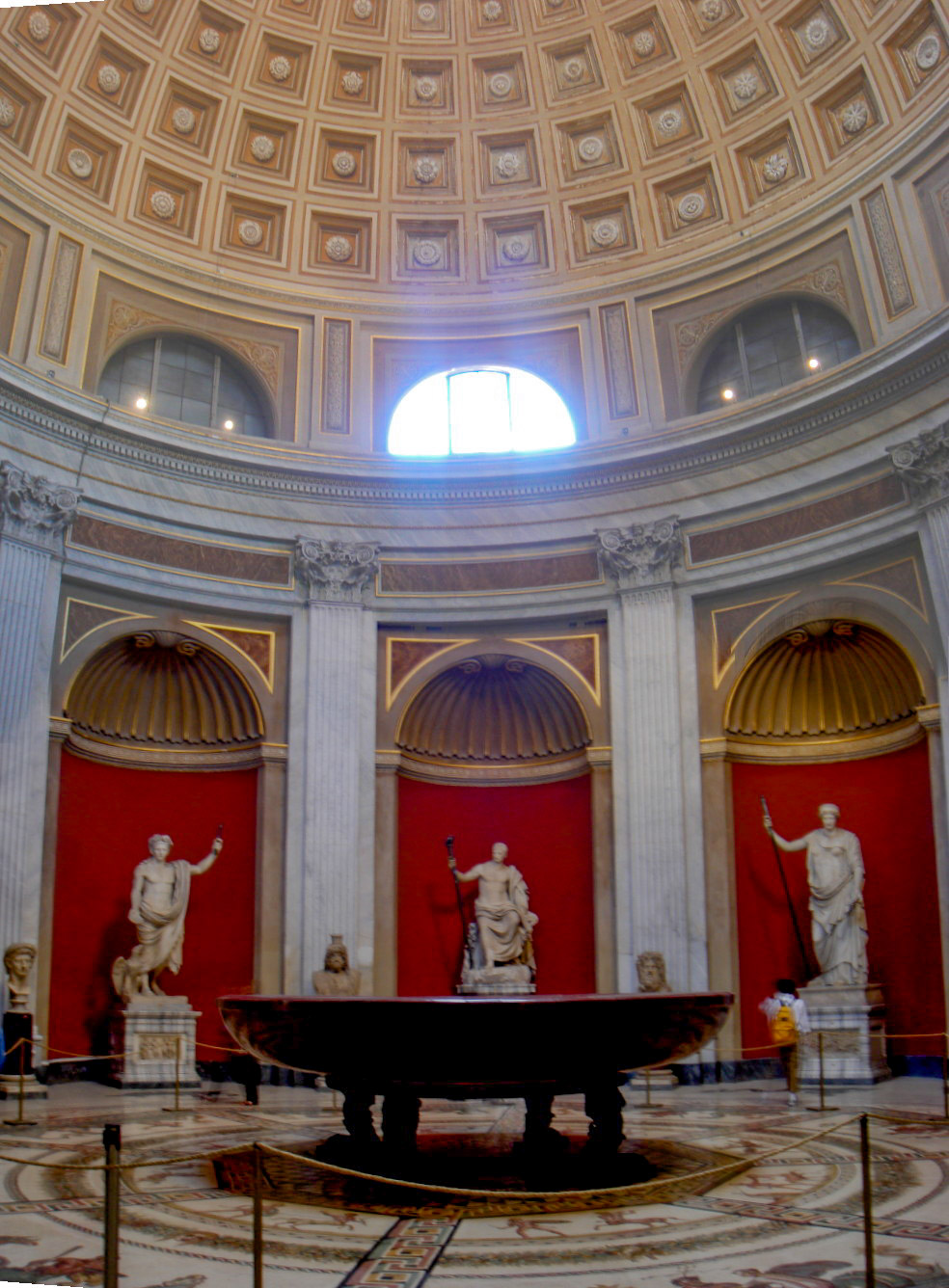
Sala Rotonda, Museo Pio-Clementino

For Pope Pius VI Simonetti designed a sequence of three new halls that links the Cortile Ottagono with the western wing of Bramante's complex. First to be built was the Sala a Croce Greca, which was named after its plan and based on Roman tomb architecture since it was designed to house the two colossal porphyry sarcophagi taken from the Mausoleum of Constantina. Its crossing (w. 9 m) is covered with a shallow sail vault, and its arms with coffered barrel vaults; the articulating pilaster order is a hybrid of Doric, Tuscan, and Ionic. This room is reached from the library wing of the main palace by a grand, double-return staircase flanked by free-standing columns and piers, which support the raking cornice of a coffered barrel vault. This was produced in collaboration with Pietro Camporese the Elder; the monumental vestibule for the staircase was added in 1786 by Pietro's son Giuseppe. The Sala Rotonda (c. 1780) is based on the Temple of Minerva Medica (4th century AD) in Rome. It is a domed cylindrical space (diam. nearly 18 m), ten bays in circumference, surrounded by statuary niches between fluted pilasters and lit by a drum of thermal windows. Leading from this hall to the Cortile Ottagono is the Sala delle Muse (c. 1782; l. 24 m), which consists of a central octagon with a high, coved vault and barrel-vaulted vestibules at either end. The form of this space and its articulation by free-standing Corinthian columns, with vault frescoes and canvases (1786) by Tommaso Conca, was intended to re-create the impression of similar halls in Roman baths and palaces.

== Legacy ==
The Museo Pio-Clementino is remarkable as an early attempt at purposeful museum design, where the whole suite of 'always classical rooms ... gently but powerfully elevate the spectator's mood'. It presages the thematic approach to this type taken throughout the Romantic era. Simonetti's preference for accuracy and precision, not only in the antique forms and details of his spaces but also in the nature and quality of their materials and construction, was learnt from Winckelmann. By virtue of his stylistic orientation, he was elected to membership of the Accademia di San Luca in 1778, with the support of Giovanni Battista Piranesi and his circle. His admission piece (Rome, Accadema Nazionale di San Luca), a curiously forward-looking project for a public entertainment complex with ballrooms, theatres and shops, is a study in Neoclassicism as rational functionalism.

== Bibliography ==
- Golzio, Vincenzo (1936). "SIMONETTI, Michelangelo". Enciclopedia Italiana. Rome: Istituto dell'Enciclopedia Italiana.
- Burckhardt, J. (1855). Der Cicerone: Eine Anleitung zum Genuss der Kunstwerke Italiens. Basel: Schweighauser'sche Verlagsbuchhandlung. p. 377.
- Collins, J. (2012). "Museo Pio-Clementino, Vatican City: Ideology and Aesthetics in the Age of the Grand Tour" (PDF). In Carole Paul (ed.). The First Modern Museums of Art. The Birth of an Institution in 18th- and Early-19th-Century Europe. Los Angeles: The J. Paul Getty Museum. pp. 113–143. ISBN 978-1606061206.
- Marchegiani, C. (2018). "SIMONETTI, Michelangelo". Dizionario Biografico degli Italiani (in Italian). Vol. 92: Semino–Sisto IV. Rome: Istituto dell'Enciclopedia Italiana. ISBN 978-88-12-00032-6.
