= William Hood (art historian) =

William Hood is an art historian. He was born in Birmingham, AL in 1940 and educated at the Episcopal High School, Alexandria, VA, the University of Georgia and the Institute of Fine Arts of New York University. He is the Mildred C. Jay Professor of Art Emeritus at Oberlin College, where he taught from 1974 through 2007. Professor Hood was a Visiting Professor in the history of Italian Renaissance Art at Columbia University's Department of Art History and Archaeology from 2008 through 2010. He was Visiting Professor in Italian Renaissance and Baroque Art at the Institute of FIne Arts, New York University from 2010 to 2020.

== Research ==
His research interests center around Italian Renaissance art, as well as the art of 17th and 18th century France, Italy, and Spain. He has published on a variety of subjects in Renaissance and Baroque art. His book, Fra Angelico at San Marco, published by Yale University Press, won the 1993 George Wittenborn Memorial Book Award, the 1994 Eric Mitchell Prize and was a finalist in the Premio Salimbeni Competition in Italy.

== Education and scholarship ==
Professor Hood received his B.F.A. and M.A. at the University of Georgia. He did his doctoral work at the New York University Institute of Fine Arts and was awarded a Ph.D. in 1977. He taught at Oberlin College from 1974 to 2007 and held Visiting Professorships at Columbia University and NYU's Institute of Fine Arts. He was a Fellow of the American Academy in Rome and a Fellow and twice Visiting Professor at Villa I Tatti, the Harvard University Center for Italian Renaissance Studies in Florence. He is a recipient of fellowships from the National Endowment for the Humanities and the Andrew W. Mellon Fellowship at the Metropolitan Museum of Art in New York City.
