= Gozzi Altarpiece =

1520 painting by Titian

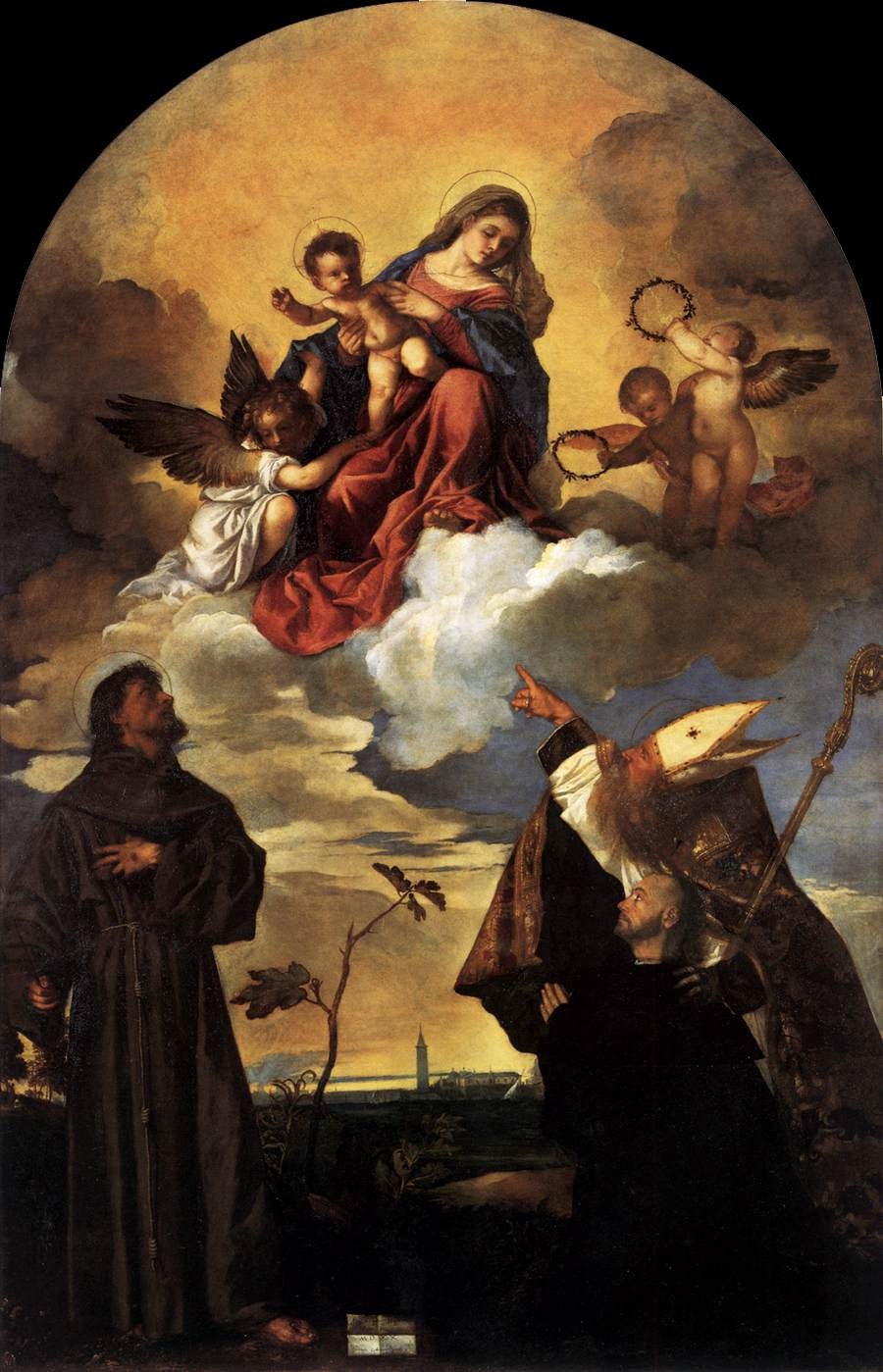
- Artist: Titian
- Year: 1520
- Medium: Oil on panel
- Dimensions: 320 cm × 206 cm (130 in × 81 in)
- Location: Pinacoteca civica Francesco Podesti, Ancona

The Gozzi Altarpiece is an oil painting by the Italian Renaissance master Titian, dating from 1520. It is located in the Pinacoteca civica Francesco Podesti, in Ancona.

== History ==
The painting is the first dated work by Titian. It was commissioned by Alvise Gozzi, a merchant from Ragusa (modern Dubrovnik) who was active in Venice, for the church of San Francesco. The presence of a view of Venice in the background had a political message: in 1510 Pope Julius II had given freedom of navigation and commerce to Ancona at the expense of Venice, but in 1520 the European situation had cancelled this privilege. The presence of the Saints Francis and Blaise, respectively symbolizing Ancona and Ragusa, was thus a hint to their submission of Venice, represented by the Virgin Mary.

== Description ==
The painting depicts the Madonna and Child appearing on a cloud, above a sunset sky with golden, orange and red colors. They are flanked by a clothed cherub and two naked cherubs, who offer Mary laurel crowns. Below are the saints Francis of Assisi, who shows his stigmata, and Blaise, patron saint of Ragusa, who points at the heavenly tableau while he rests a hand on the shoulder of the kneeling donor.

The composition was perhaps inspired by Raphael's Madonna of Foligno, although developed according to Titan's more modern and lively style.

== See also ==
- List of works by Titian
