= John Baptist Jackson =

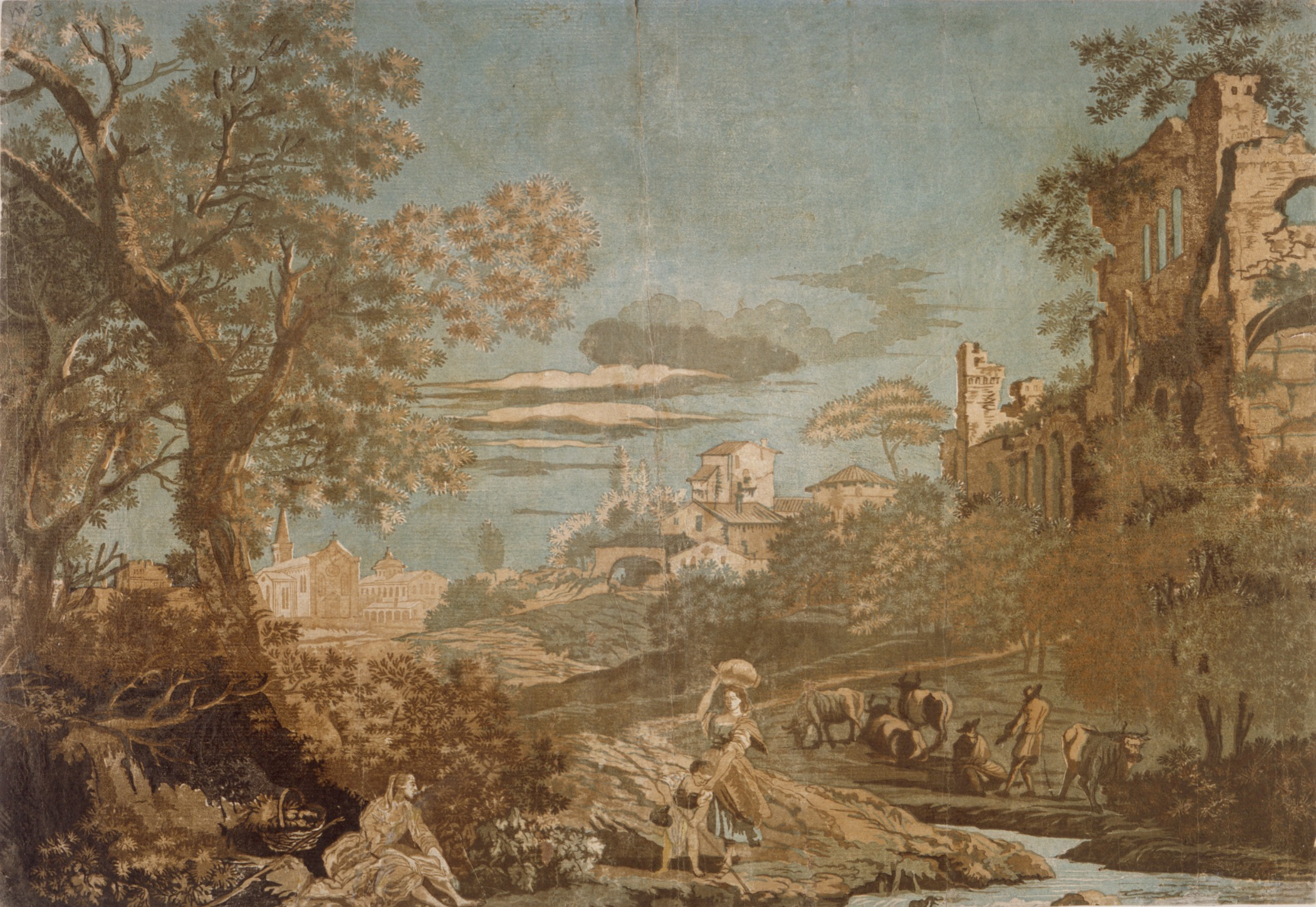
Heroic Landscape with Women at Brook, Child Fishing, and Herdsmen c. 1744

John Baptist Jackson (1701–1780) was a British artist, a woodcut printmaker of the eighteenth century. He lived and worked in Paris and Venice. Jackson was prolific, ambitious and innovative within the medium, and produced both chiaroscuro and polychrome prints, as well as wallpaper.

Jackson made prints after oil paintings rather than imitation of ink-and-wash drawings. Jackson's work was remarkable for its subtle overprinting to incorporate a wider range of colours, for which he developed new, oil-based inks. Also notable in some works is his use of heavy embossing to emphasize and highlight areas of his compositions, for which he used a rolling press of his own construction. This use of embossing may have been influenced by British contemporaries Elisha Kirkall (1681/2–1742) and Arthur Pond (1701–58).

Details of Jackson's life are few and far between. He arrived in Paris in 1725, and had interactions with French printmakers Vincent Le Sueur and Jean M. Papillon, and collector Pierre Crozat, as detailed in the 'Enquiry'. He left for Rome in 1730, then for Venice. He returned to England in 1745, and embarked on a venture to create wallpapers.
