= Coronation of the Virgin (disambiguation) =

The Coronation of the Virgin is a subject in Christian art.

Coronation of the Virgin may also refer to:

- Coronation of the Virgin (Beccafumi)
- Coronation of the Virgin (El Greco, Illescas)
- Coronation of the Virgin (Filippo Lippi), Uffizi
- Coronation of the Virgin (Fra Angelico, Louvre)
- Coronation of the Virgin (Fra Angelico, Uffizi)
- Coronation of the Virgin (Gentile da Fabriano)
- Coronation of the Virgin (Lorenzo Monaco)
- The Coronation of the Virgin by Enguerrand Quarton
- Coronation of the Virgin (Rubens)
- Coronation of the Virgin (Velázquez)
- Coronation of the Virgin Altarpiece by Moretto da Brescia
- Marsuppini Coronation by Filippo Lippi, Vatican Museums
- Oddi Altarpiece (Raphael)
