= Coronation of the Virgin =

Marian Christian devotion

The Coronation of the Virgin Mary in Heaven
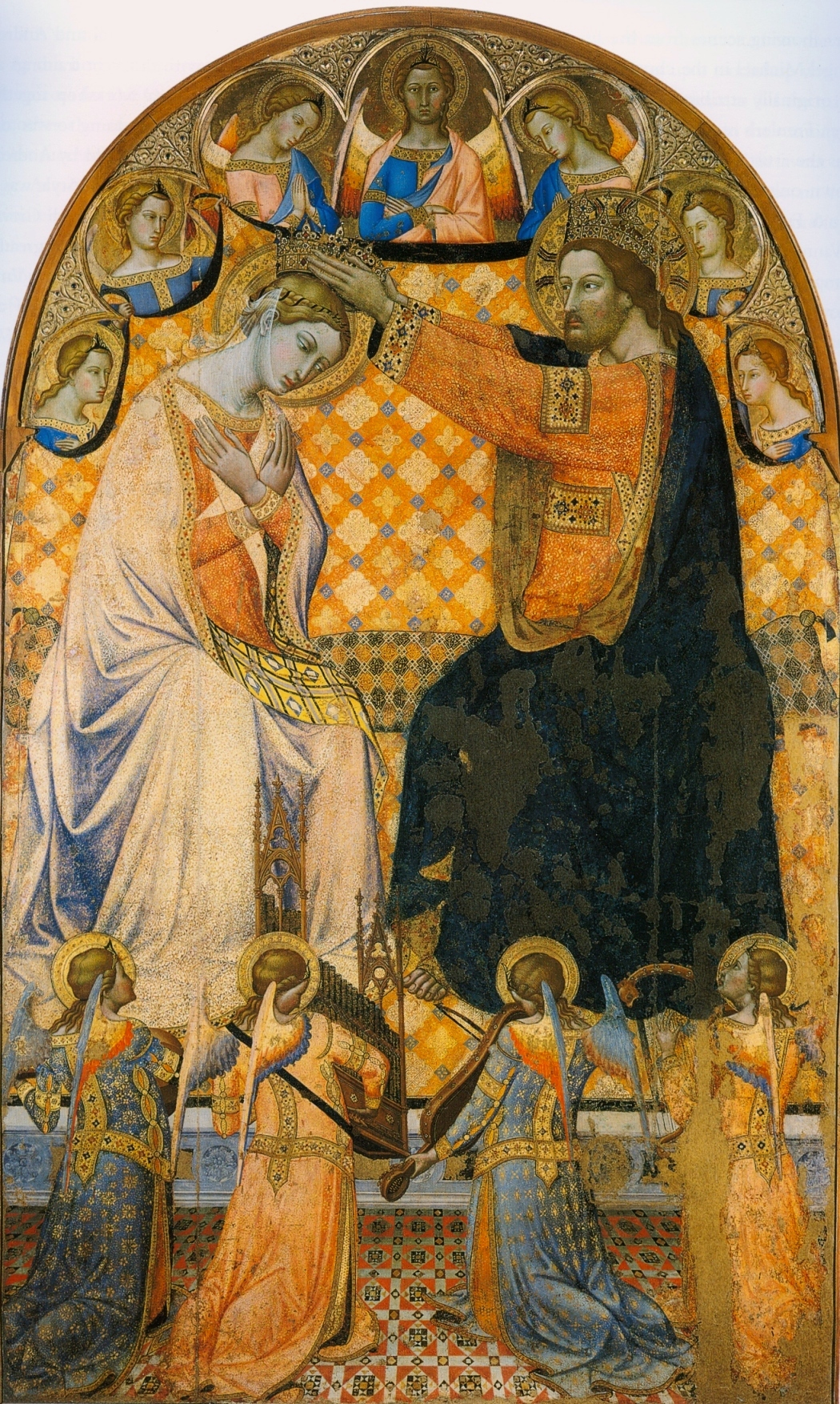
- Sanctae Mariae Coronavi by Giacomo di Mino's Gothic version. c. 1340–1350

Litany of Loreto by Pope Sixtus V (1587): Queen of Angels and All Saints, Queen assumed into Heaven Pope Pius XII (1954): Queen of Heaven Second Vatican Council (1964): Queen of the Universe (Lumen Gentium, Section #59)
- Venerated in: Catholic Church
- Feast: May 31st (until 1968); August 22nd (present)
- Attributes: Mary crowned in Heaven by Jesus or jointly with God the Father, surrounded by Cherubim and/or Saints

The Coronation of the Virgin or Coronation of Mary is a subject in Christian art, especially popular in Italy in the 13th to 15th centuries, but continuing in popularity until the 18th century and beyond. Christ, sometimes accompanied by God the Father and the Holy Spirit in the form of a dove, places a crown on the head of Mary as Queen of Heaven. In early versions, the setting is a Heaven imagined as an earthly court, staffed by saints and angels; in later versions Heaven is more often seen as in the sky, with the figures seated on clouds. The subject is also notable as one where the whole Christian Trinity is often shown together, sometimes in unusual ways. Coronations of the Virgin are also seen in Eastern Orthodox Christian icons, specifically in the Russian Orthodox Church after the 18th century. Mary is sometimes shown, in both Eastern and Western Christian art, being crowned by one or two angels, but such an arrangement is considered a different subject.

The subject became common as part of a general increase in devotion to Mary in the Early Gothic period, and is one of the commonest subjects in surviving 14th-century Italian panel paintings, mostly made to go on a side-altar in a church. The great majority of Roman Catholic churches had (and have) a side altar or "Lady chapel" dedicated to Mary. The subject is still often enacted in rituals or popular pageants called May crownings, although the crowning is performed by human figures.

== Official status and feast ==
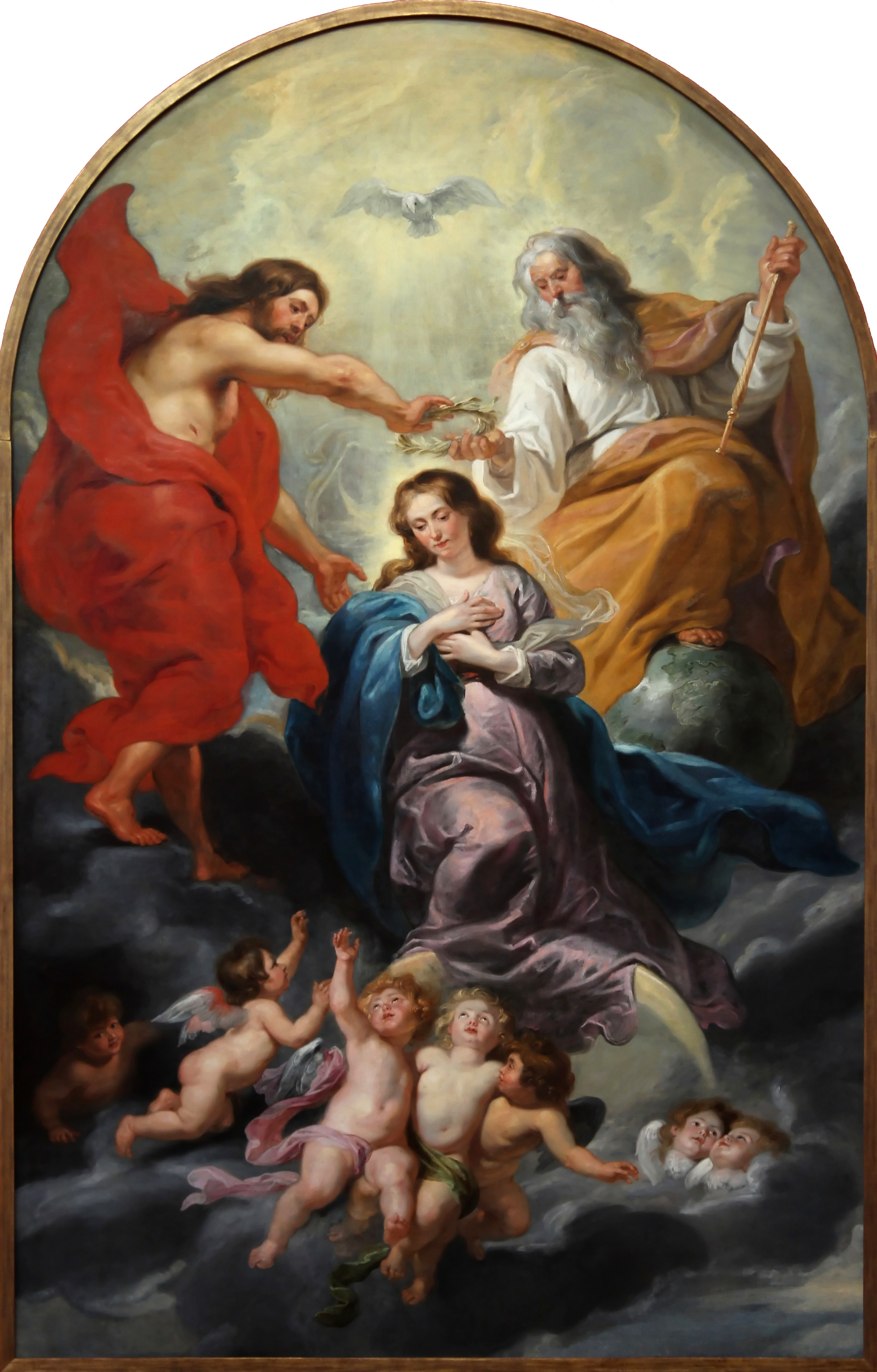
A Baroque version by Rubens, c. 1625

The belief in Mary as Queen of Heaven obtained the papal sanction of Pope Pius XII in his encyclical Ad Caeli Reginam (English: 'Queenship of Mary in Heaven') of October 11, 1954.

The feast deals with the Assumption of Mary's dogma: as was the case for Jesus Christ, with his bodily Ascension into Heaven, so too the celestial glorification of Mary culminates with her coronation as Queen of the Angels, of the Saints and of the entire Universe.

The Roman Catholic Church celebrates the feast every August 22, in place of the former octave day of the Assumption of Mary in 1969, a change made by Pope Paul VI. The feast was formerly celebrated on May 31, at the end of the Marian month, where the present liturgical calendar now commemorates the Feast of the Visitation. In addition, there are Canonical coronations authorized by the Pope which are given to specific Marian images venerated in a particular place.

The act of the Virgin Mother of God being physically crowned as Queen of Heaven and Earth after her Assumption is a traditional Catholic belief echoed in the Rosary. The Coronation of the Blessed Virgin Mary is the fifth of the Glorious Mysteries of the Rosary.

The Coronation of the Blessed Virgin is also a subject of devotion throughout Christianity. Beyond art, the Coronation is a central motif in Marian processions around the world, such as the Grand Marian Procession in Los Angeles, revived by the Queen of Angels Foundation.

== Origin ==
The scene is the final episode in the Life of the Virgin, and follows her Assumption – not yet dogma in the Middle Ages – or Dormition. The scriptural basis is found in the Song of Songs (4.8), Psalms (45.11–12) and Revelation (12.1–7). A sermon wrongly believed to be by Saint Jerome elaborated on these and was used by standard medieval works such as the Golden Legend and other writers. The subject also appears in Books of Hours. The title "Queen of Heaven", or Regina Coeli, for Mary goes back to at least the 12th century.

The subject also drew from the idea of the Virgin as the “Throne of Solomon”, that is the throne on which a Christ Child sits in a Madonna and Child. It was felt that the throne itself must be royal. This is related to the popular sedes sapientiae motif. In general, the art of this period, often paid for by royalty and the nobility, increasingly regarded the heavenly court as a mirror of earthly ones.

The subject seems to first appear in art, unusually, in England, where f. 102v in the Benedictional of St Æthelwold (963-984), for the Feast of the Assumption, shows the death and Coronation of the Virgin, possibly the first Western depiction. There are also a tympanum over the door of the church at Quenington in Gloucestershire of perhaps 1140, and another damaged example from Reading Abbey (Reading, Berkshire). From around this time it was rapidly adopted and is prominent in the portals of French Gothic cathedrals such as Senlis, Chartres, Strasbourg, Laon, Notre-Dame de Paris, Amiens and Reims, indeed most 13th-century cathedrals in France.

There are three examples extant on Devon rood screen dados: at East Portlemouth, Holne, and Torbryan.

The act of coronation is deeply rooted in Bible, reflecting the promise of eternal reward for all believers, as seen in James 1:12. The Scripture mentions five crowns that believers may receive in Heaven, one of which is the crown of life, awarded to "those who persevere under trials" (Revelation 2:10). Once Mary is recognized as a figure of the Church and the "exemplary realization" of the Church, she anticipates this promise and is the first to be crowned. Her coronation symbolizes hope for all believers, echoing the universal promise of salvation within the Christian faith.

== Composition ==
In earlier versions, Mary and Christ often sit side-by-side on a wide throne, and typically are only accompanied by angels in smaller altarpieces, although these were often in polyptych form, and had saints on side-panels, now often separated. Later, God the Father often sits to the left of Christ, with the Holy Spirit hovering between them, and Mary kneeling in front and below them. Christ and the Father are normally differentiated by age, and to some extent by costume: God the Father is often wearing a beehive-shaped crown, reminiscent of a Papal tiara.

By the 15th century, more individual interpretations are found. From the High Renaissance onwards, the subject is often combined with an Assumption as a group of Apostles is on the earthly space below the heavenly scene, sometimes with Mary's empty tomb. As the central panel of altarpieces became larger until it abandoned the predella and side-panels, the Coronation was one subject suited to a very tall composition, especially if it had Apostles or other saints of importance to the community depicted on the lower sections.

== Crown of Mary ==
The "crown" of Mary has been mentioned since the 6th century, as "corona virginum" (crown of virgins). The crown has several meanings in secular depictions. The ancient laurel crown in the Olympic Games signified victory, and a crown in gold and precious stones indicate power and wealth. In Christian iconography, the crown develops religious meanings. In an early mosaic in Ravenna, Italy, virgins present a crown to the child and Mary as a gesture of humility. The Three kings present their crowns to the newly born Jesus as a symbol of secular power submitting to Christ. Marian crowns often include elements of victory and glory, especially during the Baroque period.

A crowned Mary is usually seen in Jesse Trees, which stress her earthly royal descent from the House of David, something accorded considerable importance in the Middle Ages. In Santa Maria in Trastevere in Rome, she is shown as Christ's mother, who participates in his kingdom. The Latin text there, adapted from the Song of Songs, reads: Tota pulchra es, amica mea, veni coronavi.

== Individual works with articles ==
Works of single panels, if not noted otherwise.

- 1414: Coronation of the Virgin by Lorenzo Monaco; polyptych, Mary and Christ sitting side by side under ciborium and God on panel above
- c. 1420: Coronation of the Virgin by Gentile da Fabriano; Mary and Christ sitting side by side, dove above
- c. 1432: Coronation of the Virgin by Fra Angelico (Uffizi, Florence); Mary and Christ (Pancreator) sitting side by side on clouds, surrounded by greater court
- 1434–1435: Coronation of the Virgin by Fra Angelico (Louvre, Paris); (pointed middle section) with predella, Mary kneels before Christ sitting under a ciborium, surrounding great court of saints and angels
- 1441–1447: Coronation of the Virgin by Filippo Lippi (Uffizi, Florence); triple-arched, Mary kneels before sitting Christ
- after 1444: Marsuppini Coronation by Filippo Lippi (Vatican Museums); triptych, Mary kneels before sitting Christ
- 1452–1553: The Coronation of the Virgin by Enguerrand Quarton; Mary seated beneath flanking mirrored Christ, dove above
- 1483: Coronation of the Virgin with Saints by Piero del Pollaiuolo (Sant'Agostino, San Gimignano); Mary and Christ sitting side by side
- 1502–1504: Oddi Altarpiece by Raphael; Mary and Christ sitting side by side (above horizontally parted scene with empty tomb)
- c. 1534: Coronation of the Virgin Altarpiece by Moretto da Brescia; five panels, Mary kneels beneath standing Christ, above panel with God, and pair of roundels with Gabriel and Mary (Annunciation)
- 1539: Coronation of the Virgin by Beccafumi; Mary and Christ sitting side by side
- 1603–1605, Coronation of the Virgin by El Greco (Illescas); single oval panel, Mary encompassed by trinity
- 1609–1611, Coronation of the Virgin by Rubens (Hermitage, St. Petersburg); Mary kneels beneath standing Christ
- 1609–1611, Coronation of the Virgin by Rubens (Royal Museums of Fine Arts of Belgium, Brussels); Mary is sitting beneath the Trinity
- 1635–1636 Coronation of the Virgin by Velázquez; Mary beneath flanking Christ and God seated, and dove (trinity)

== Gallery ==
=== To 1500 ===
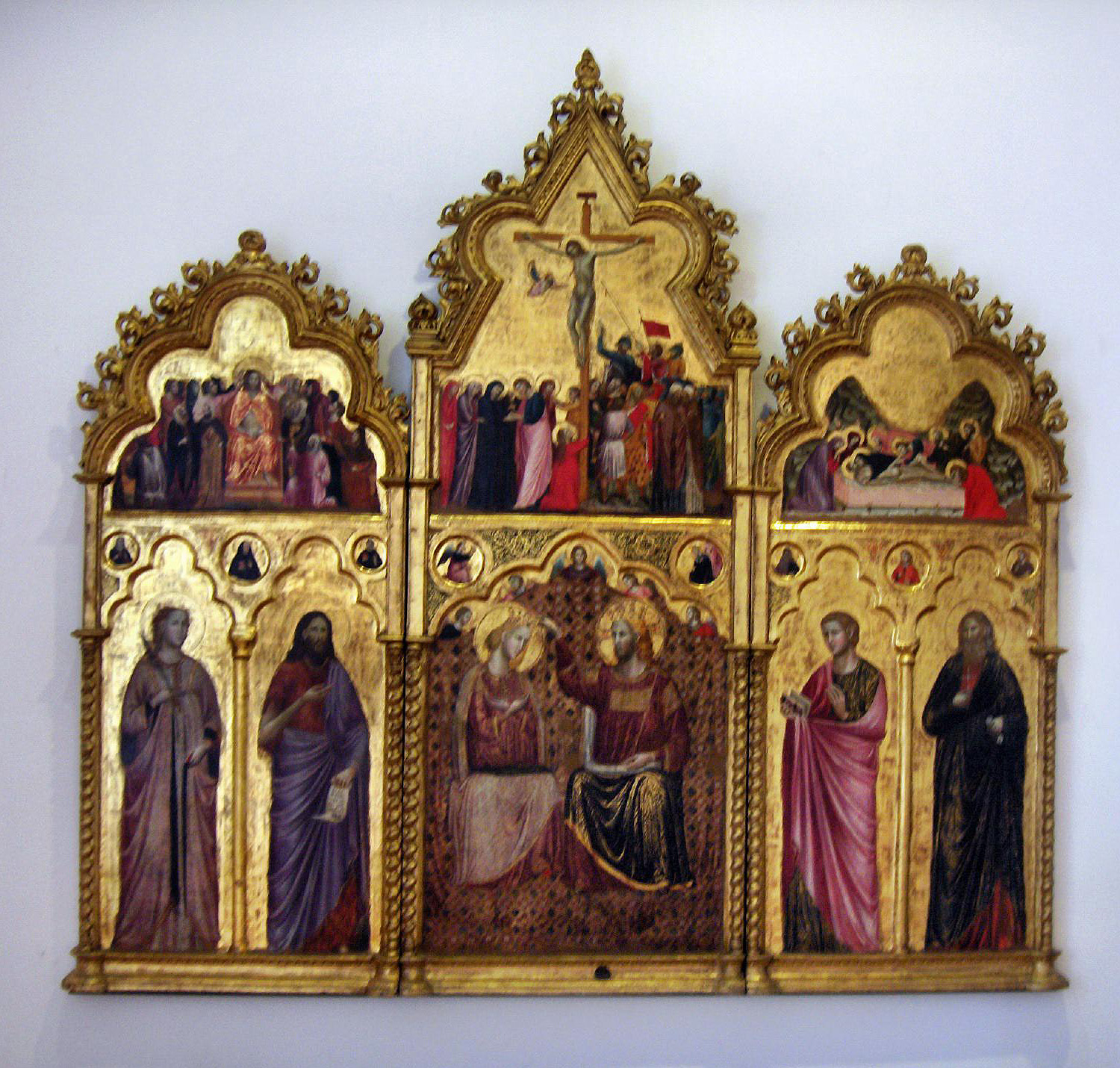
Giuliano da Rimini, 14th century

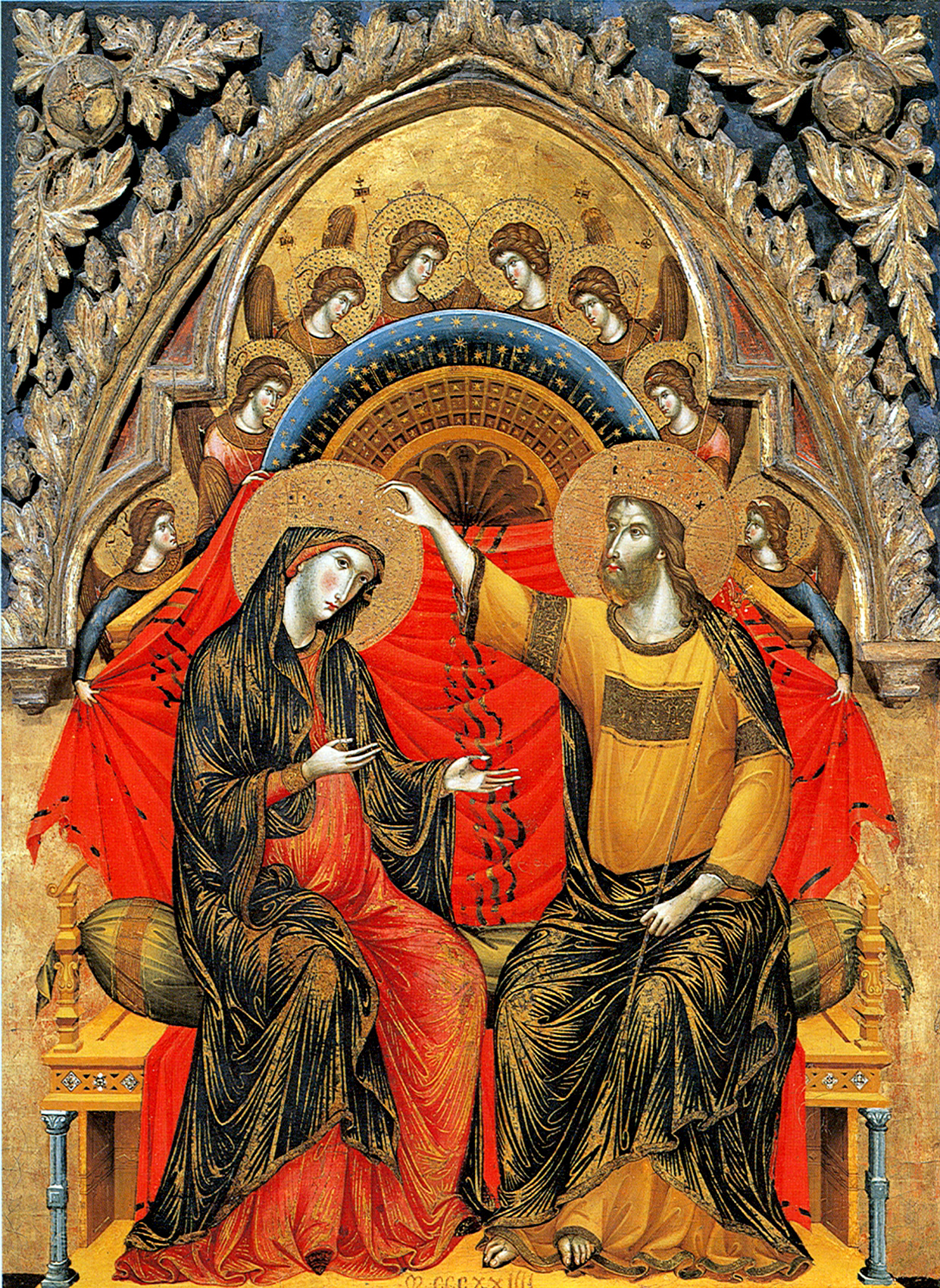
Paolo Veneziano, 1324

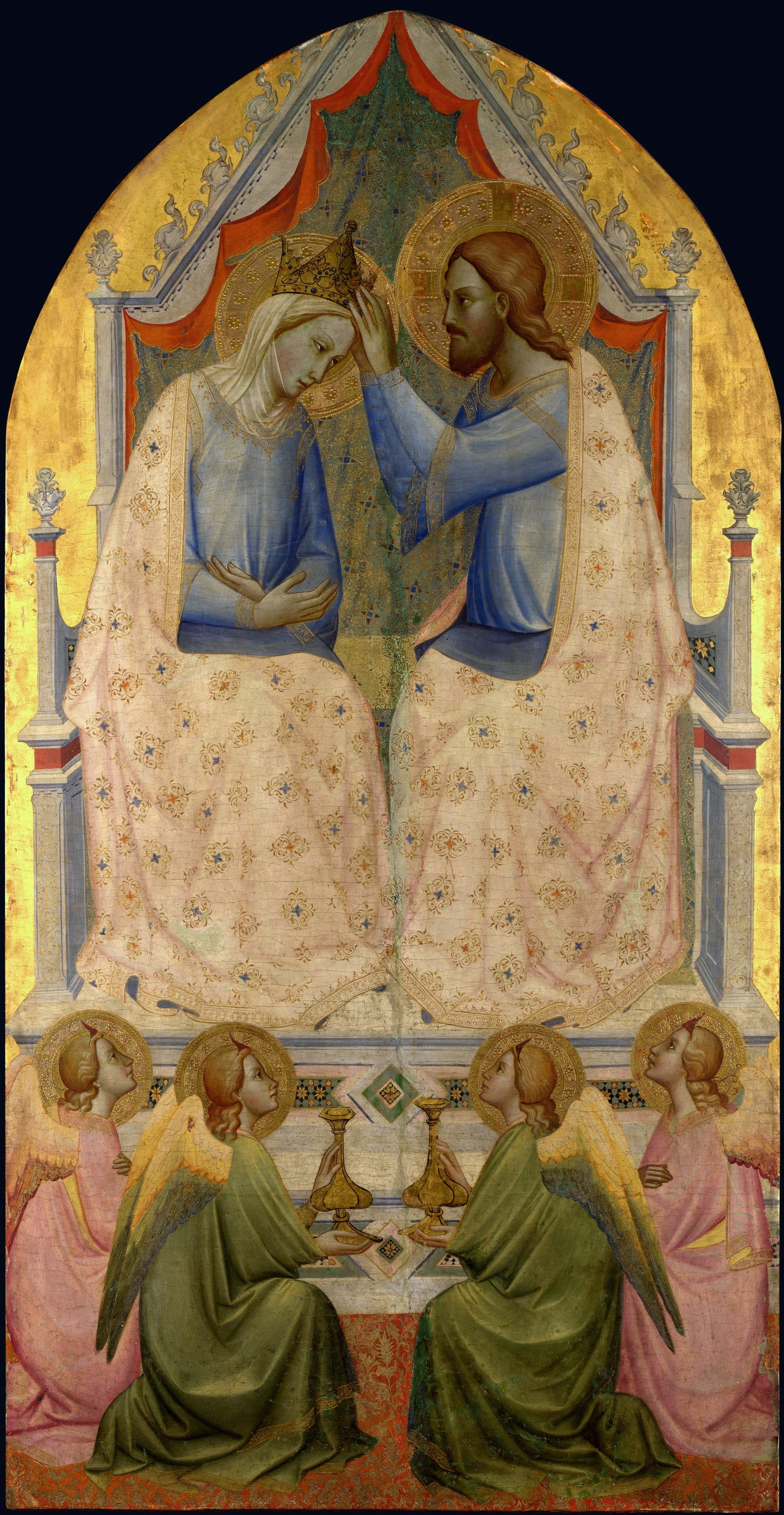
Agnolo Gaddi, c. 1380

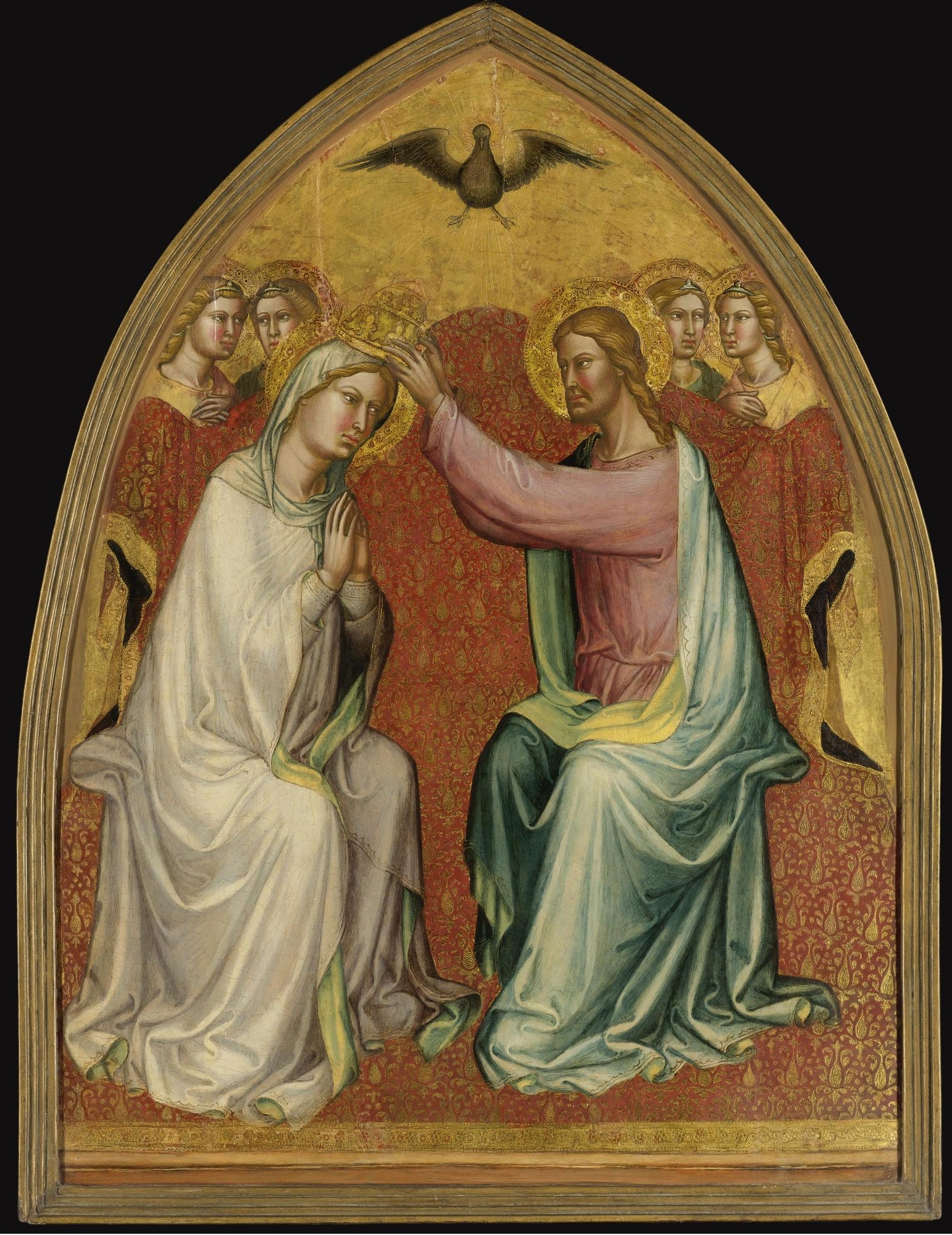
Martino di Bartolomeo, 1400

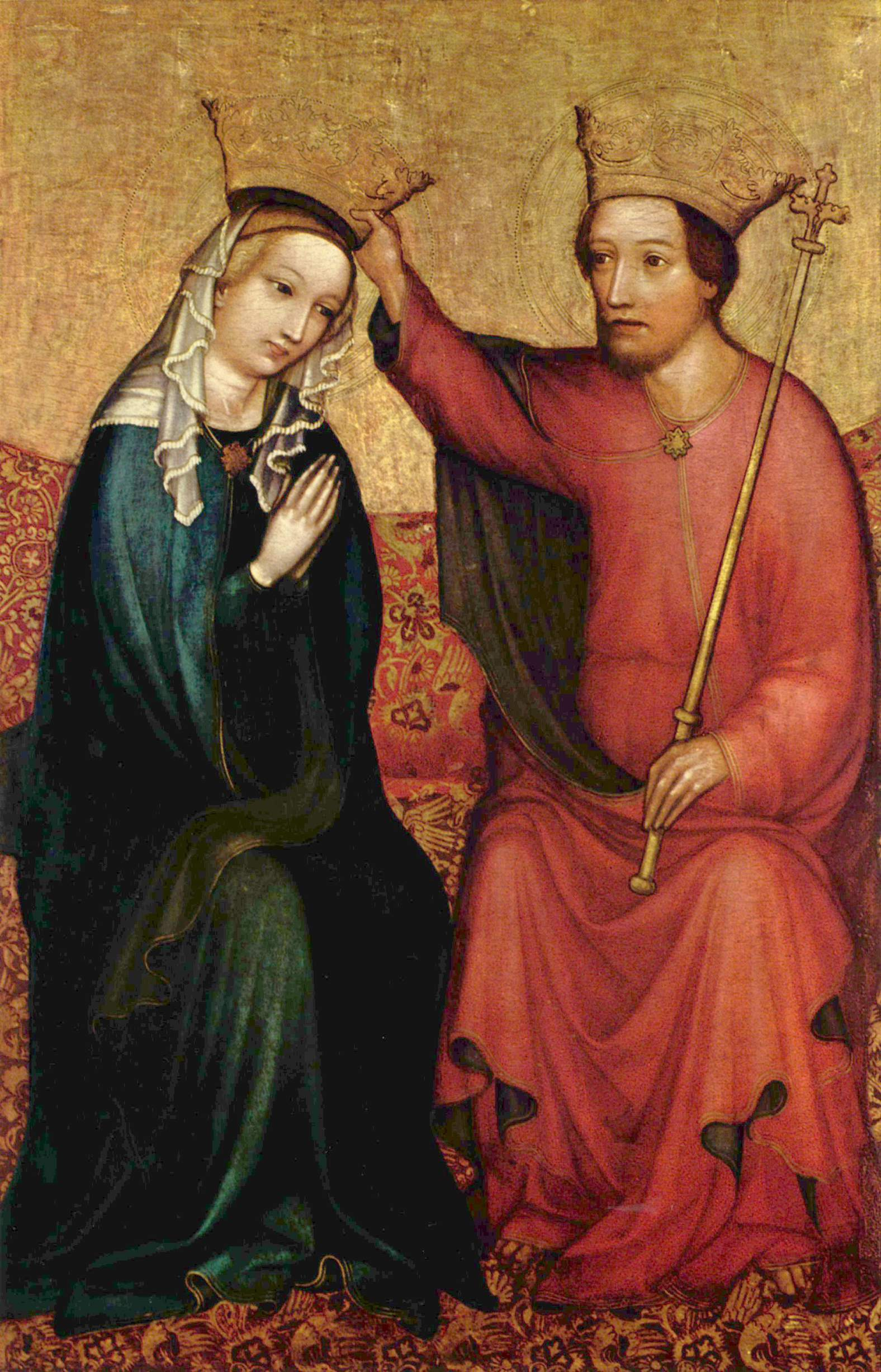
German altar, 1413–1422

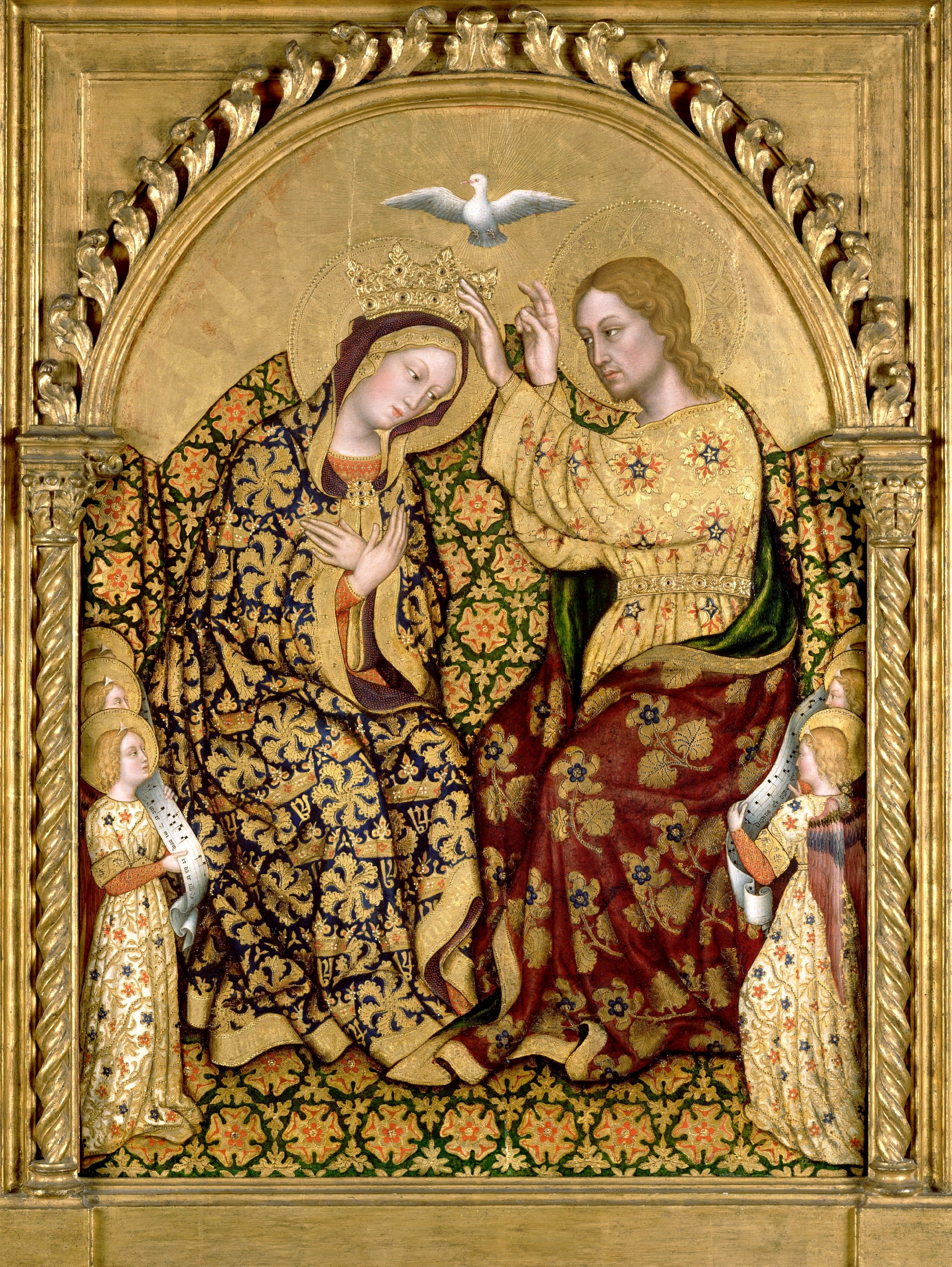
Gentile da Fabriano, 1422–1425

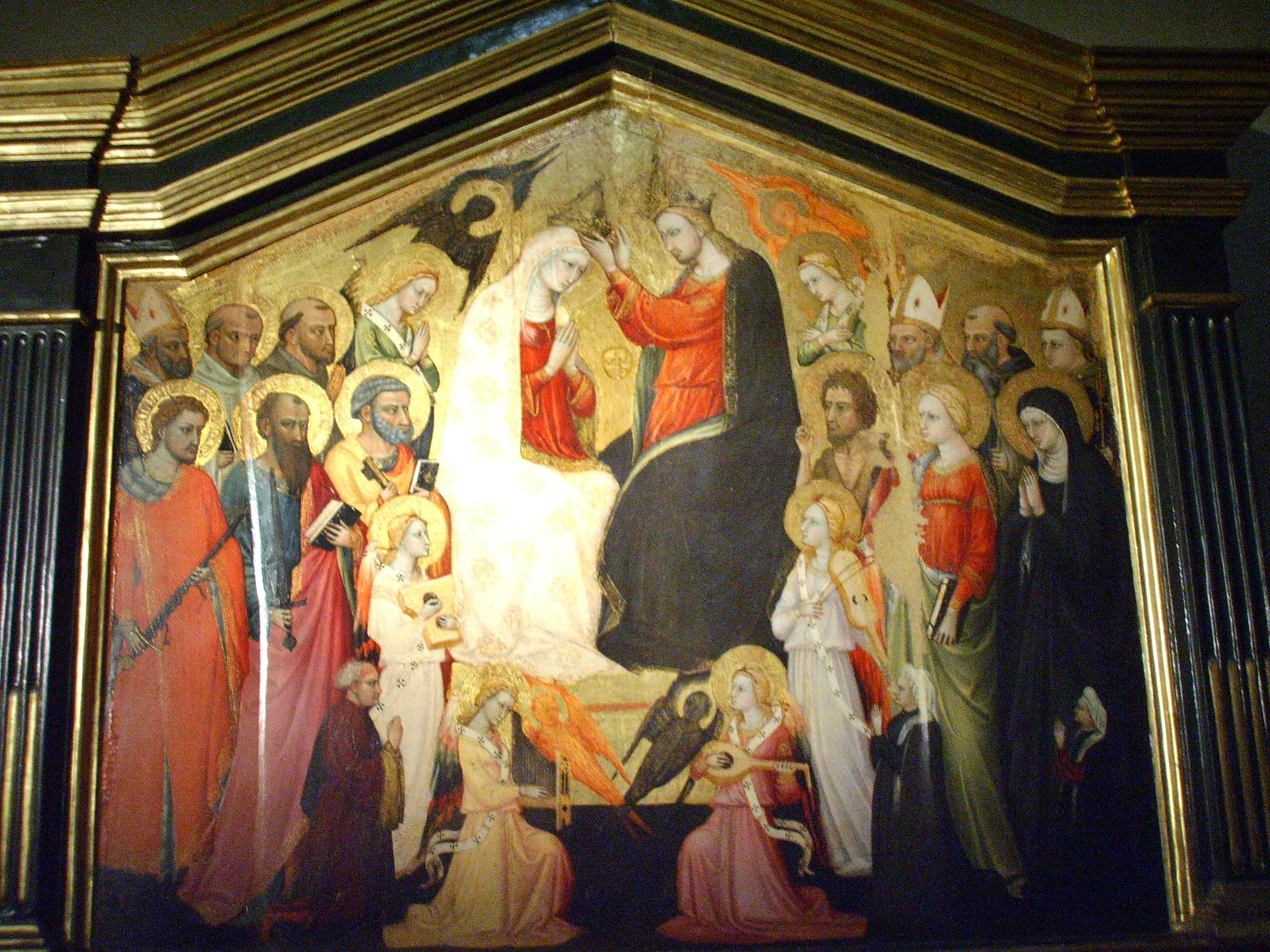
Bicci di Lorenzo, 1430

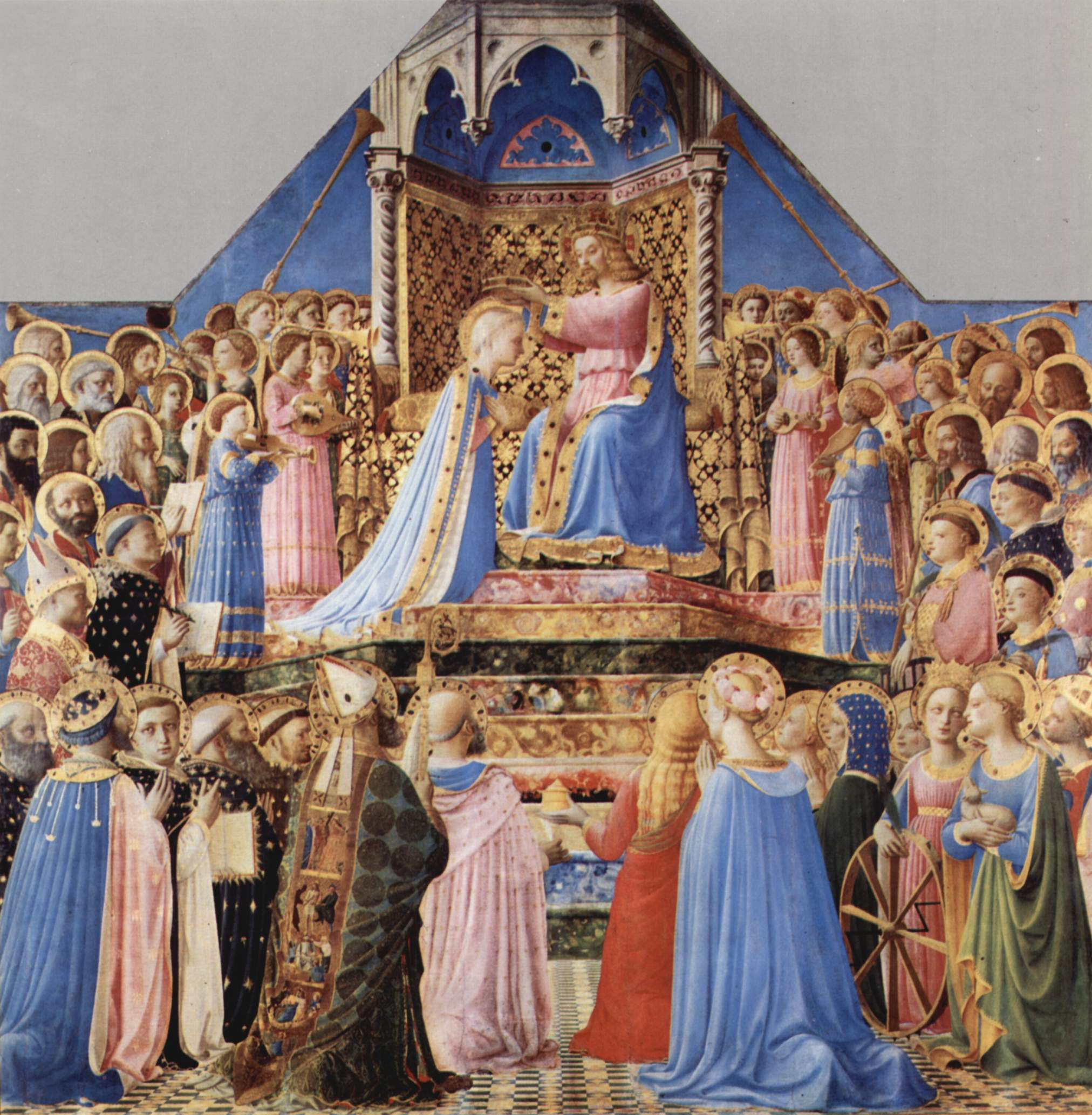
Fra Angelico, Louvre with a larger court setting, 1430–1431

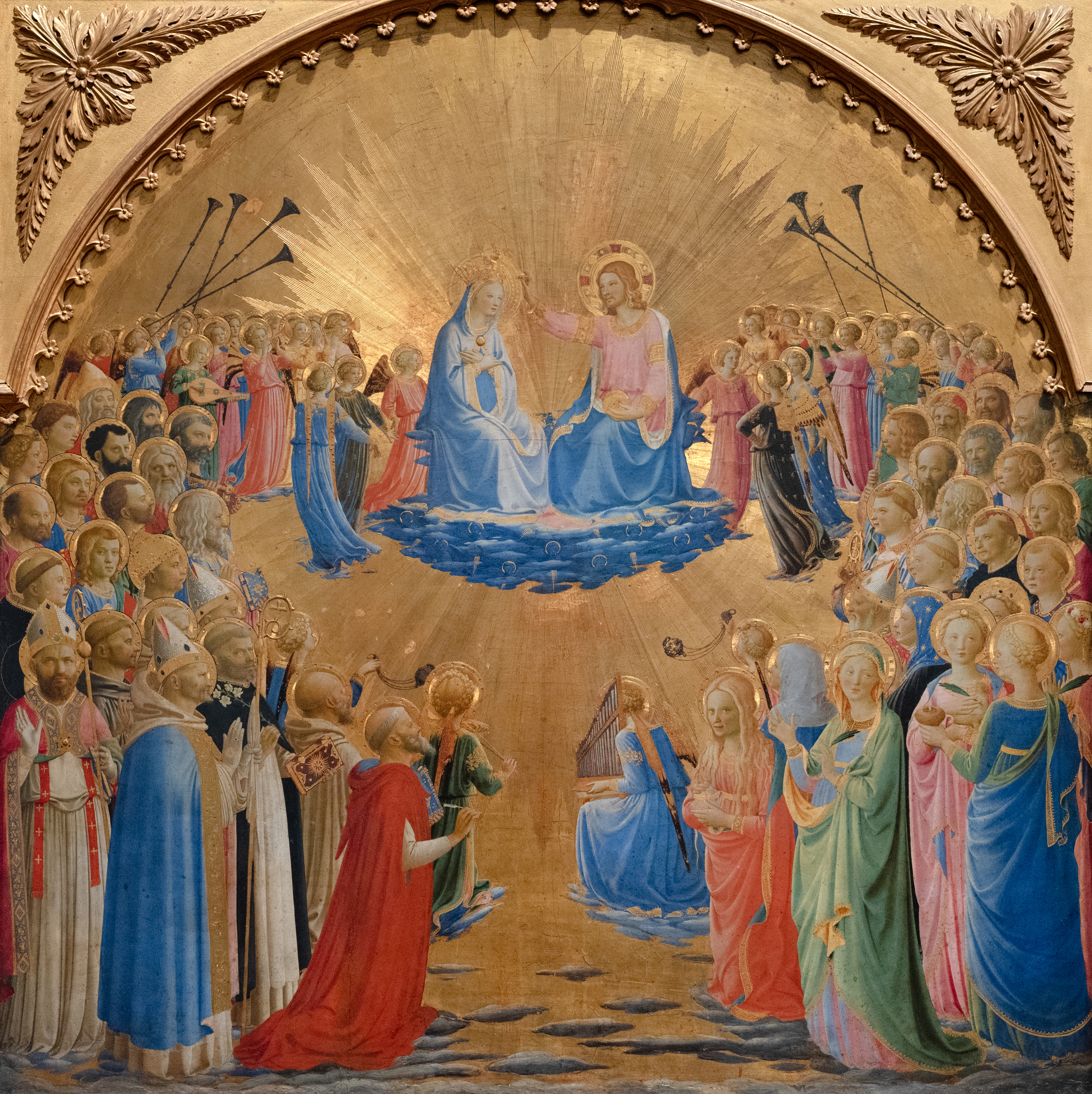
Fra Angelico, Uffizi, 1434–1435

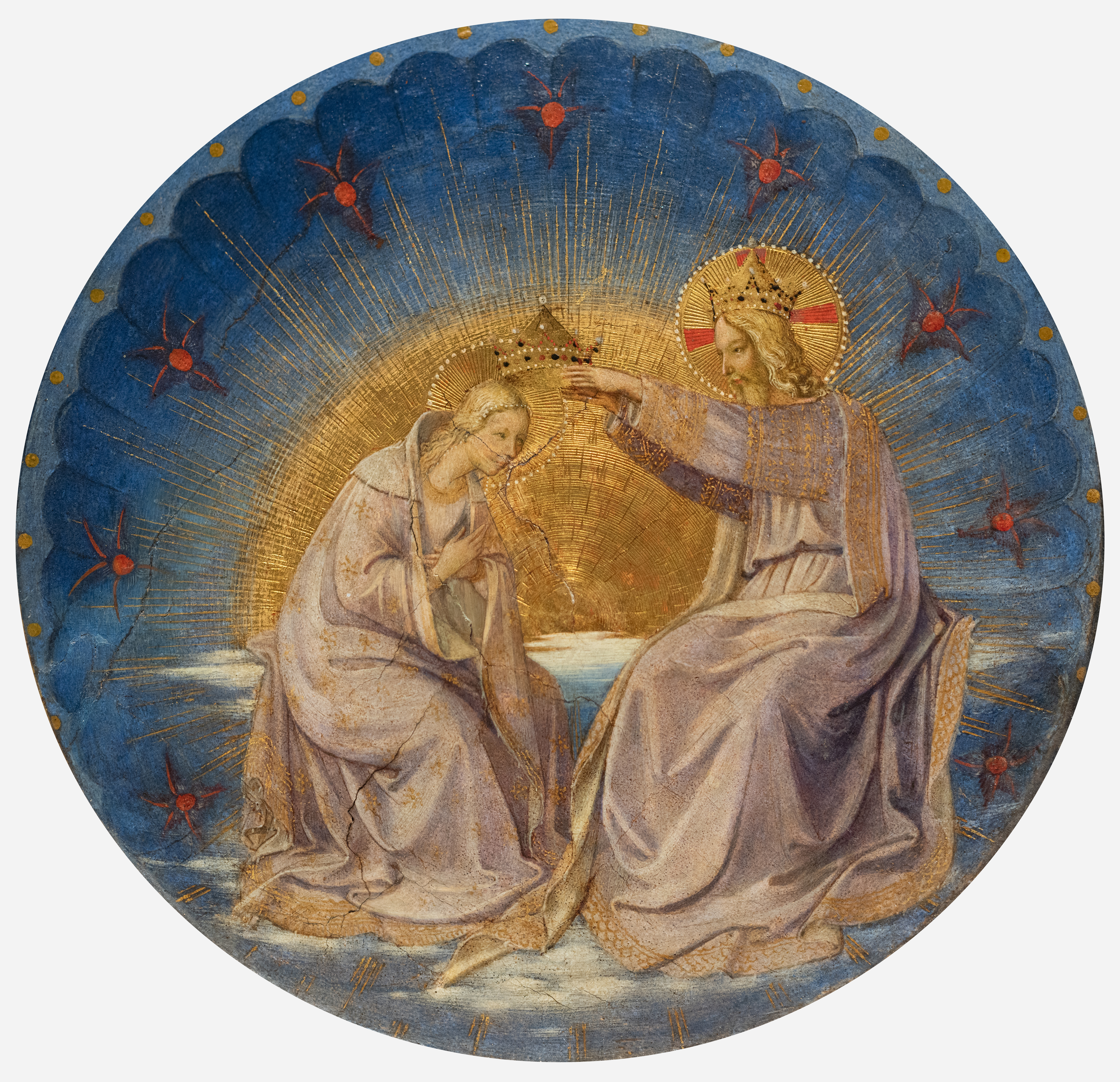
Fra Angelico, medallion, 1450s

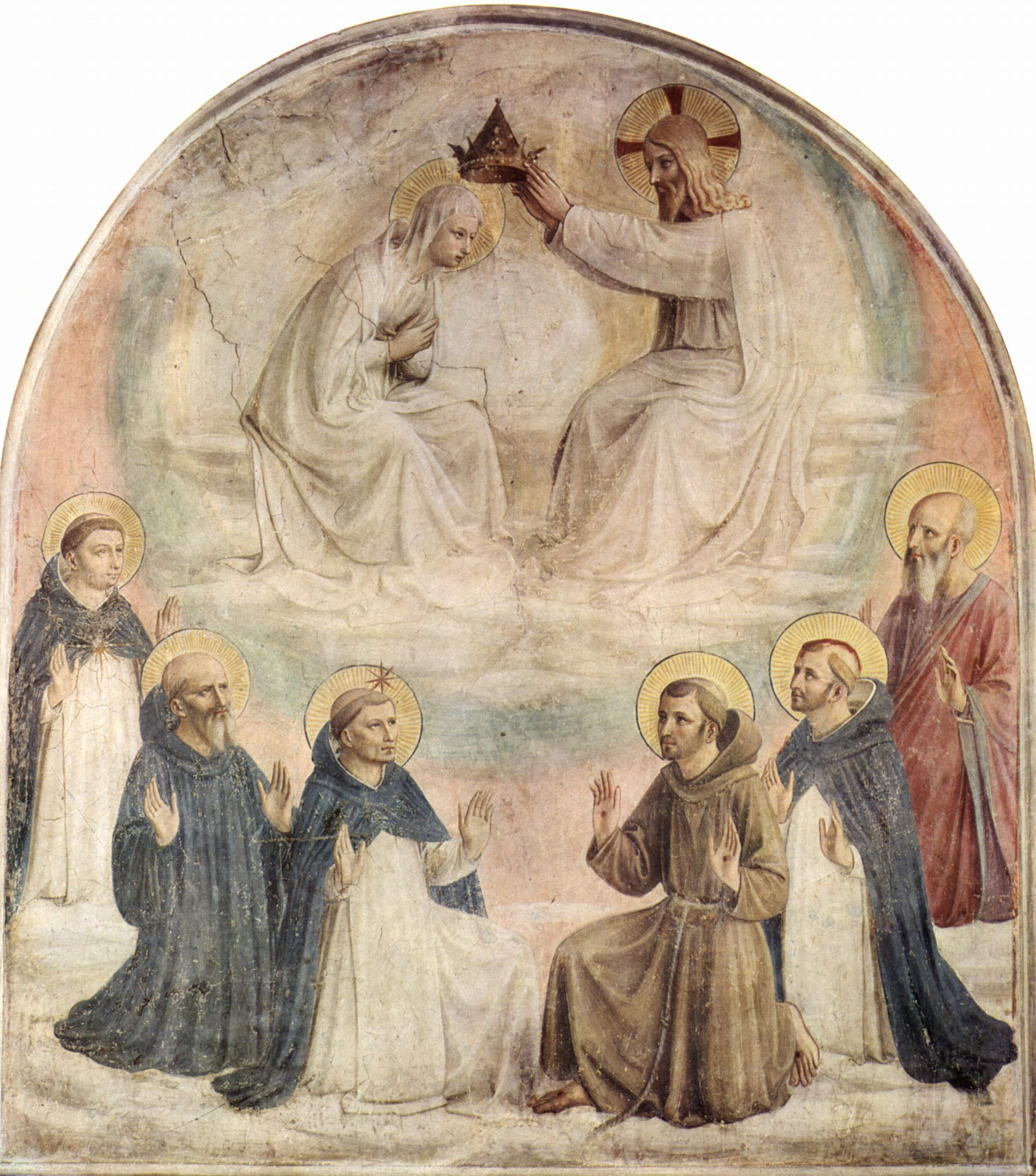
Fra Angelico, 1437–1446

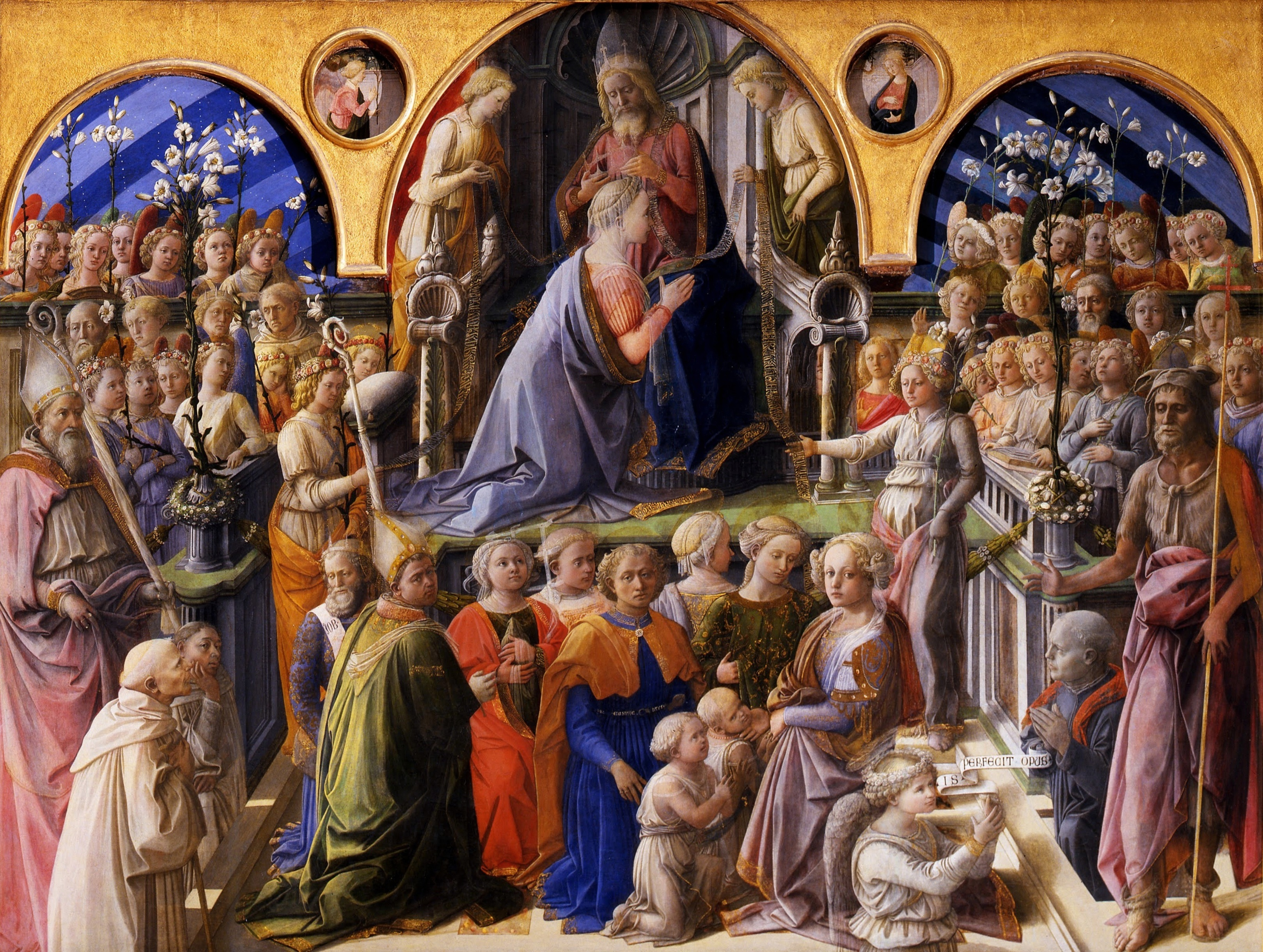
Filippo Lippi, 1441–1447

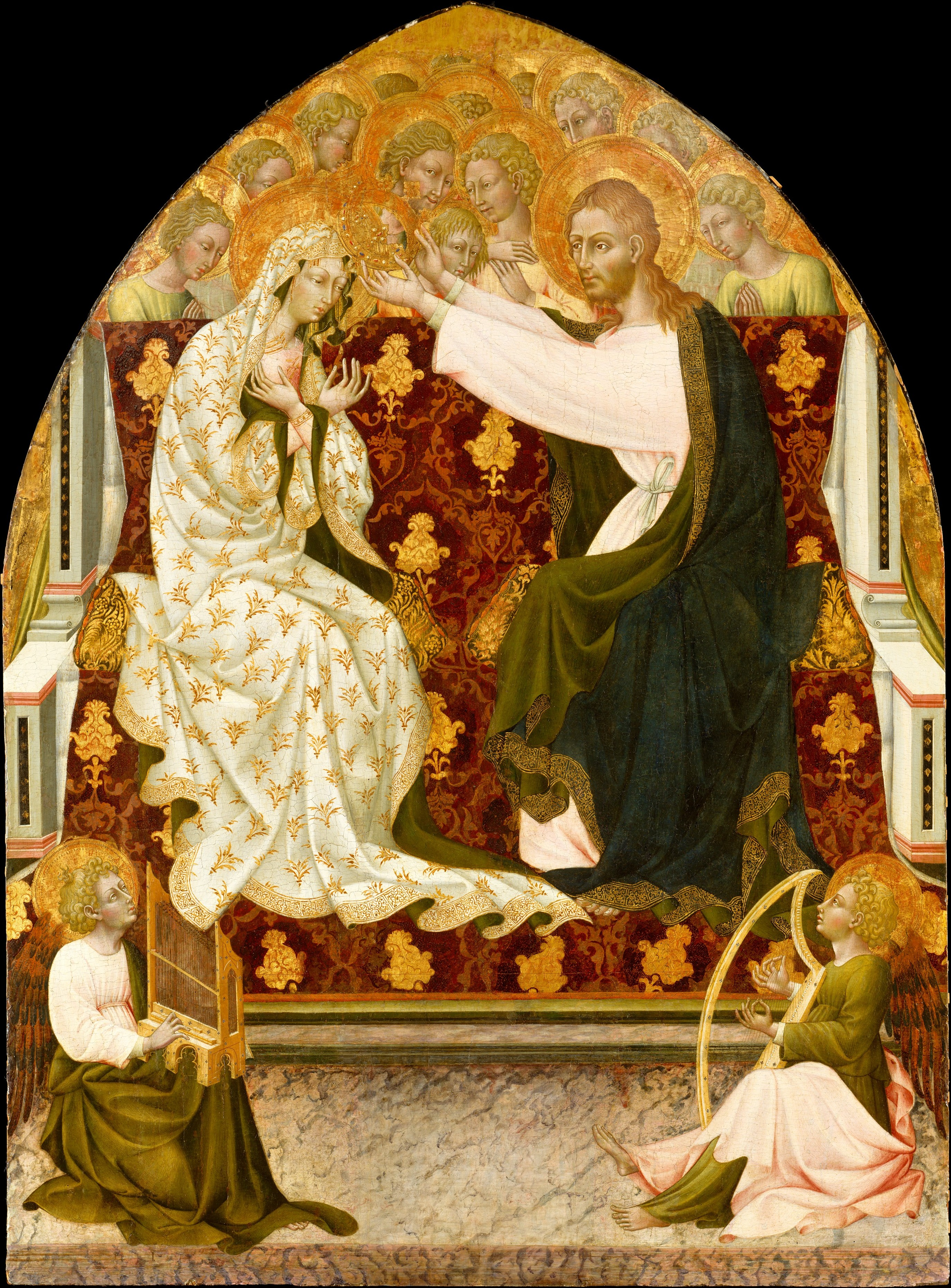
Giovanni di Paolo, 1455 (MET, New York)

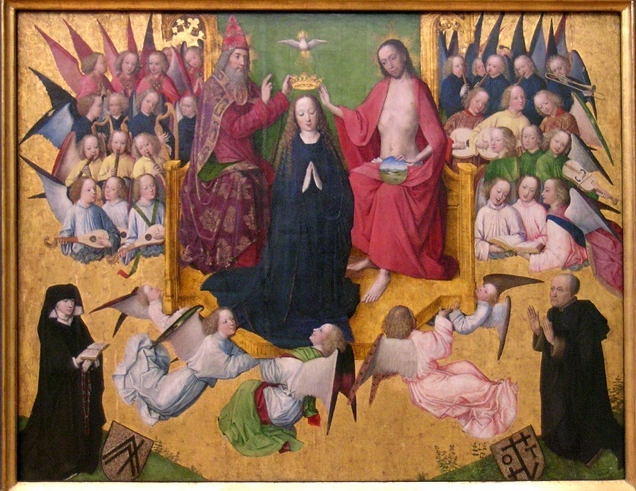
German 15th-century version with donors, Master of the Life of the Virgin

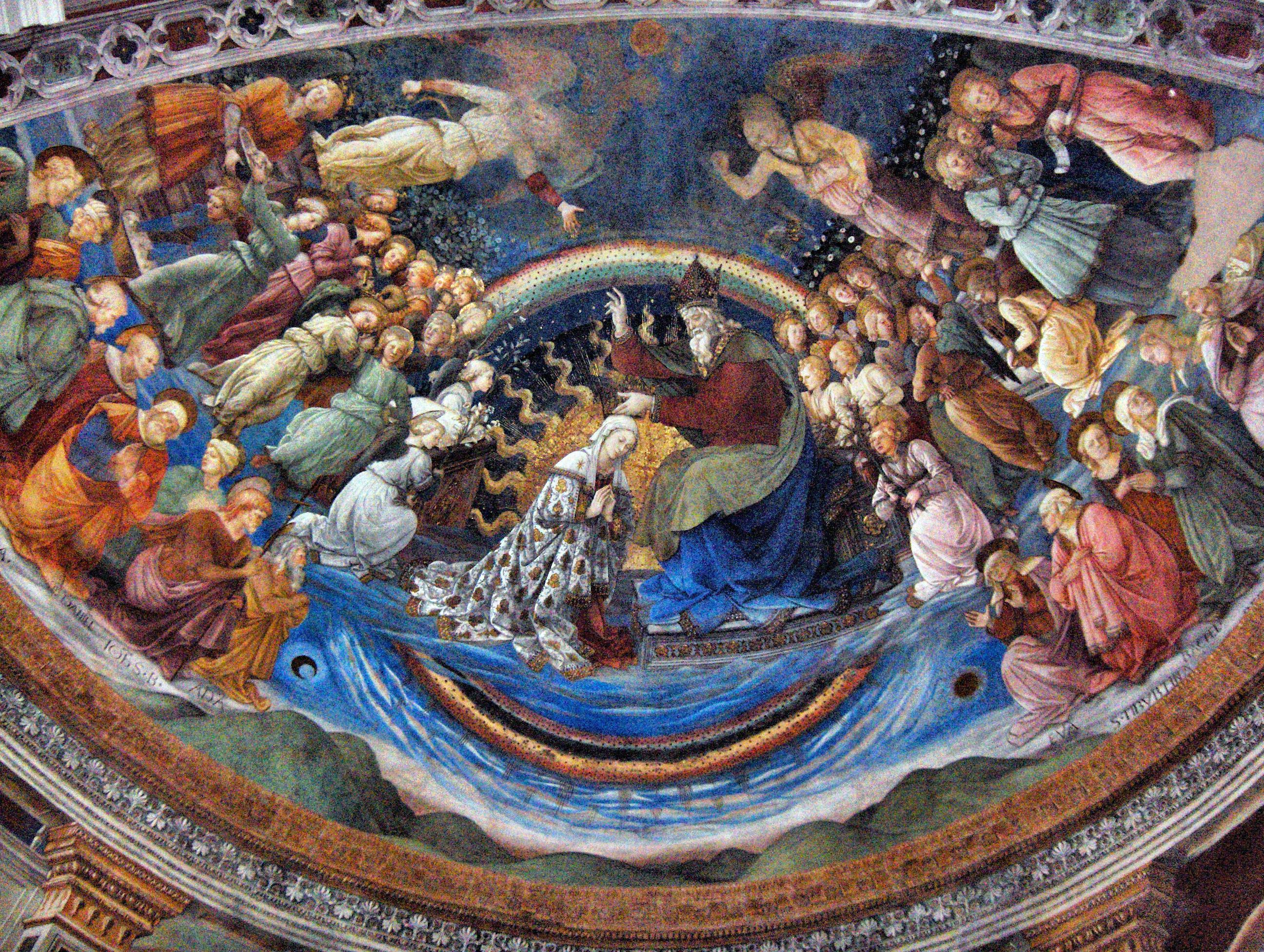
Filippo Lippi, 1467–1469; apse of the cathedral of Spoleto

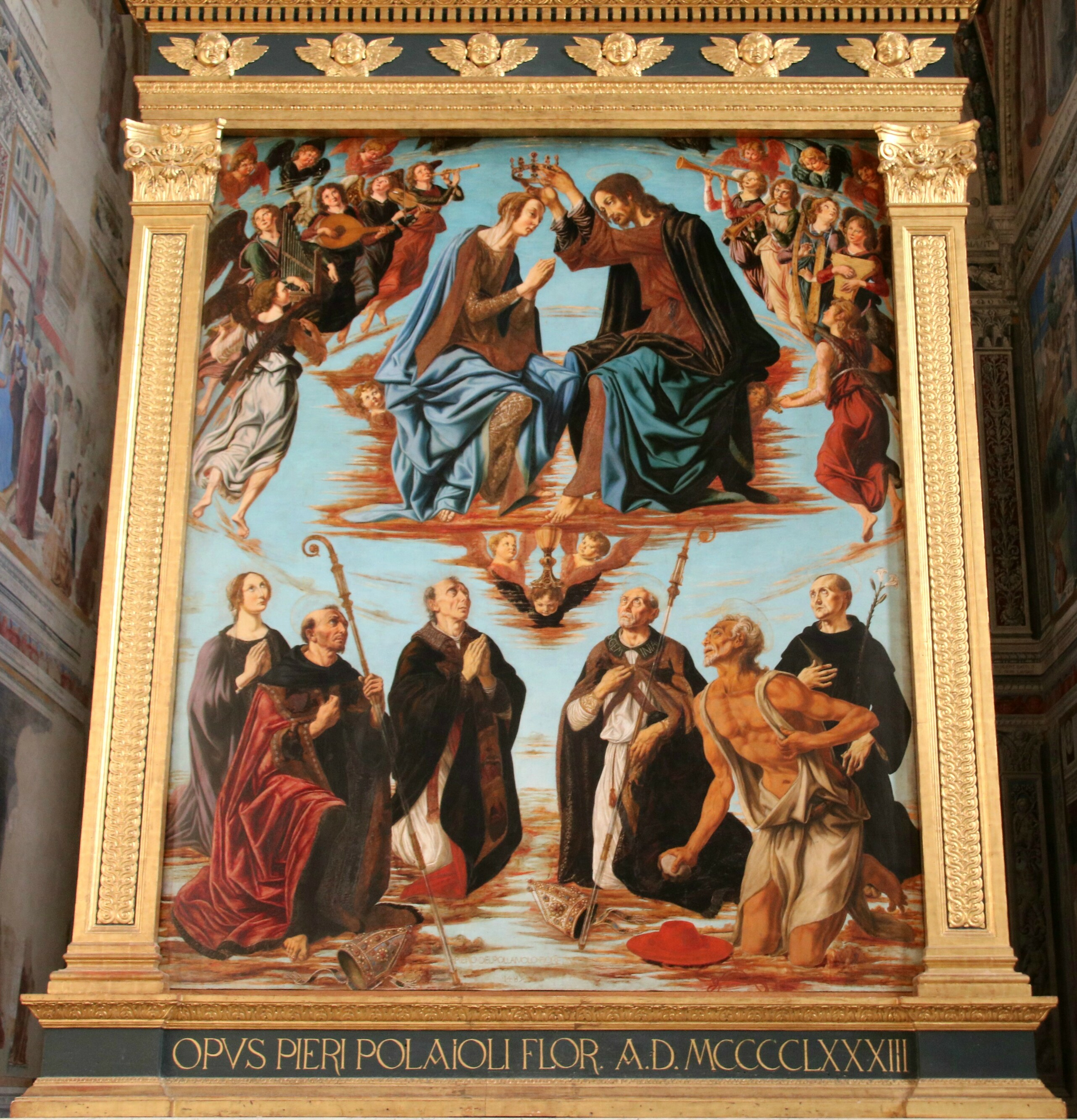
Piero del Pollaiuolo, 1483

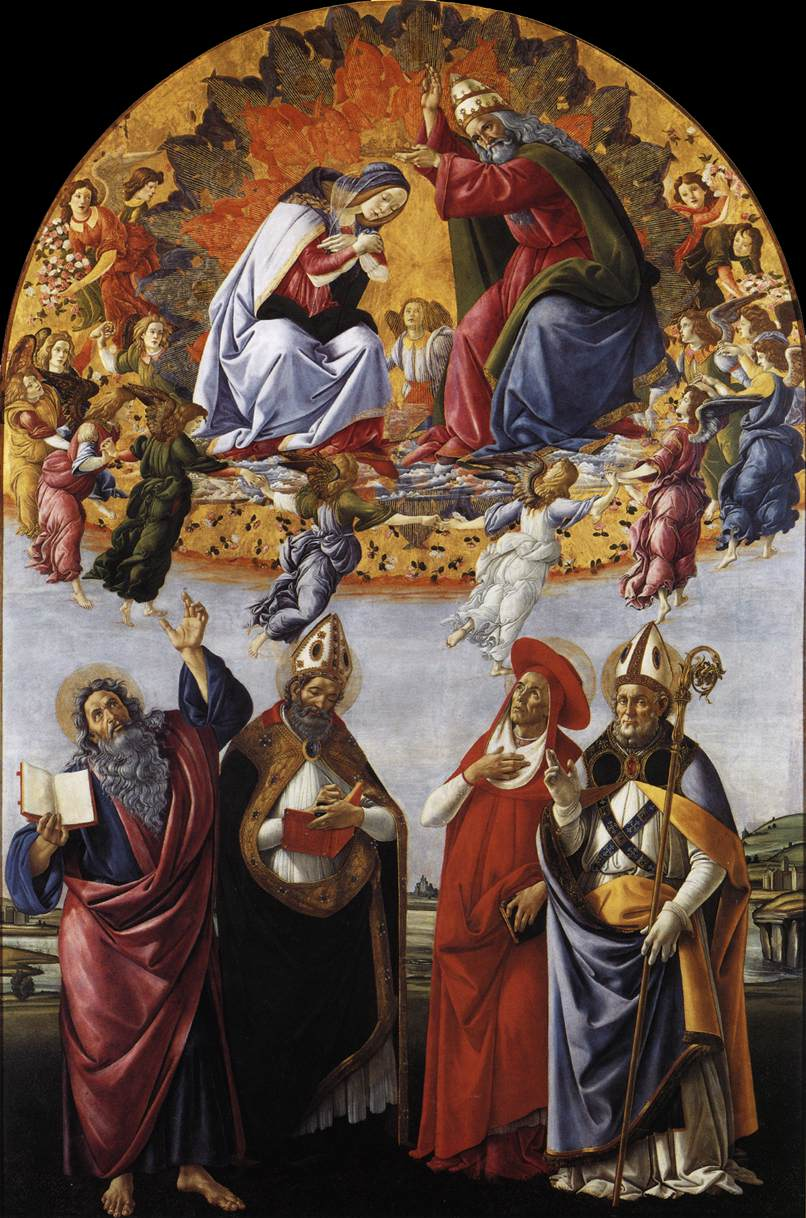
Botticelli, with only God the Father in evidence, 1490–1492

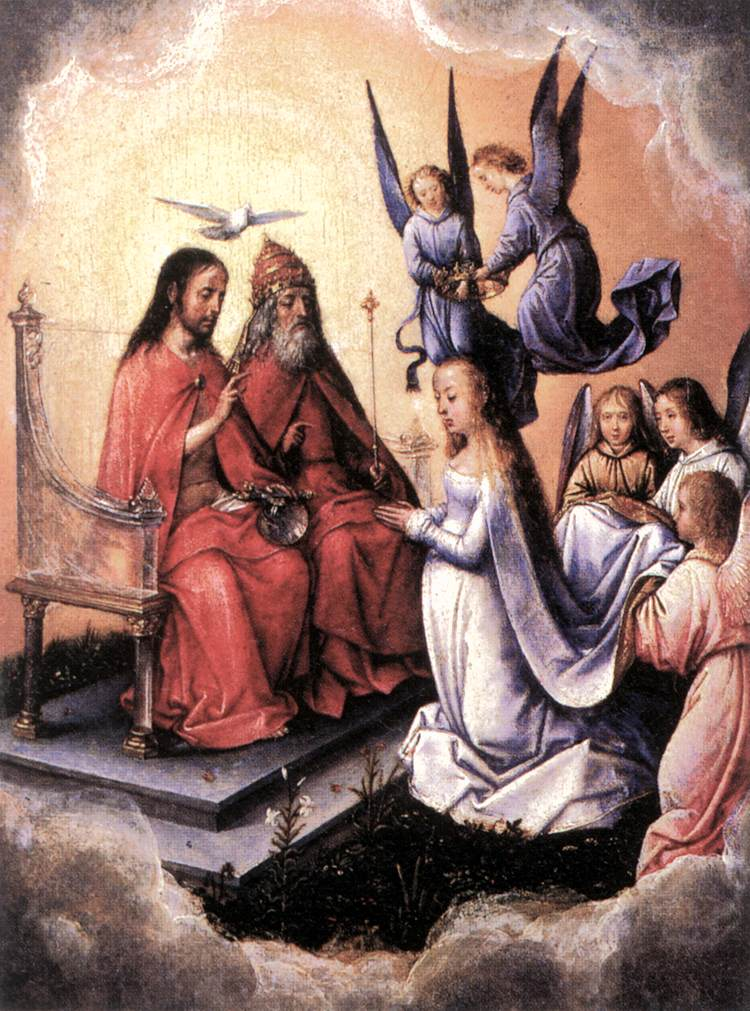
Michael Sittow, 1492–1496

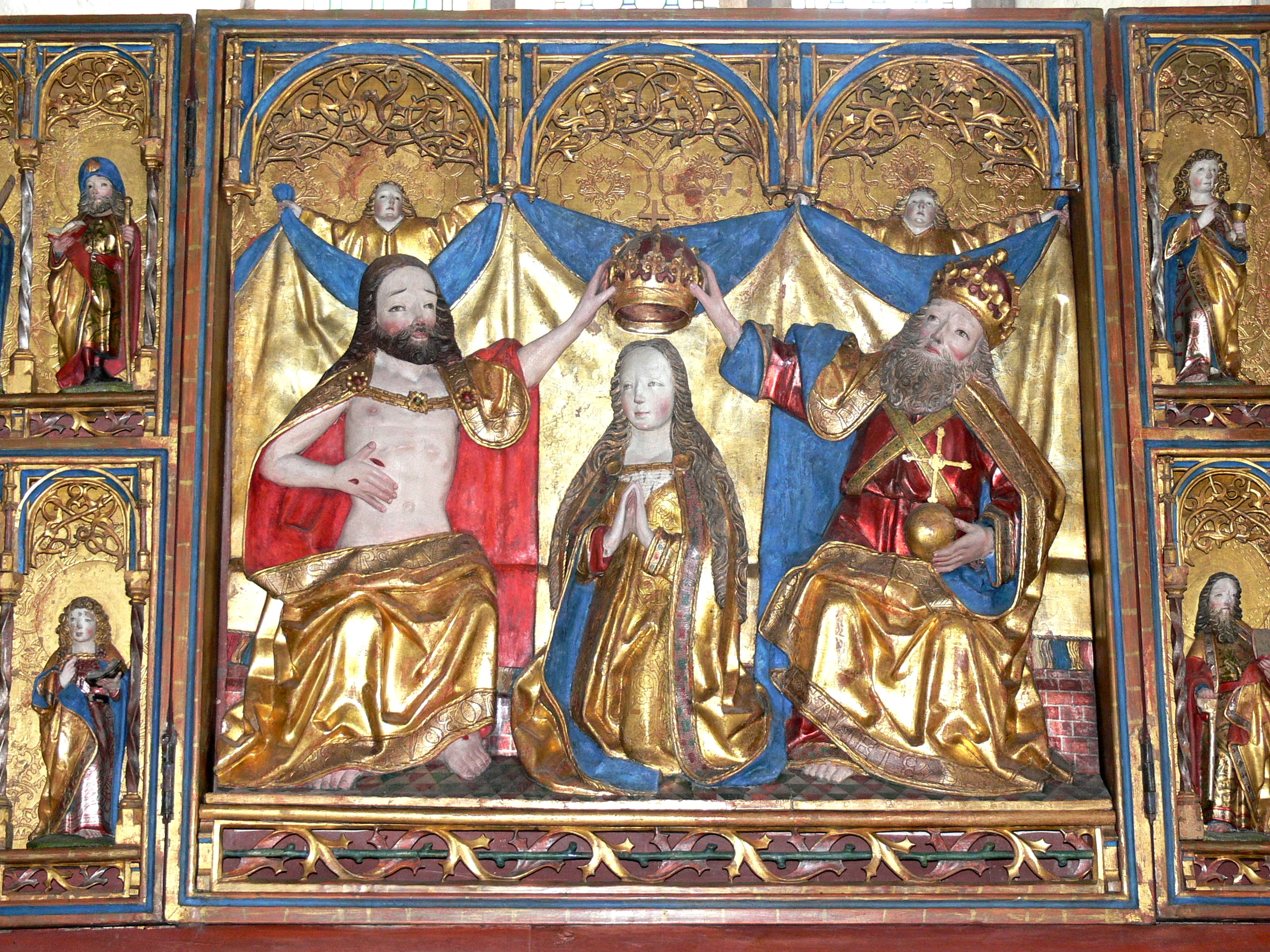
Swedish 15th-century altarpiece, carved and painted wood (Källunge Church)

=== Unusual Trinities ===
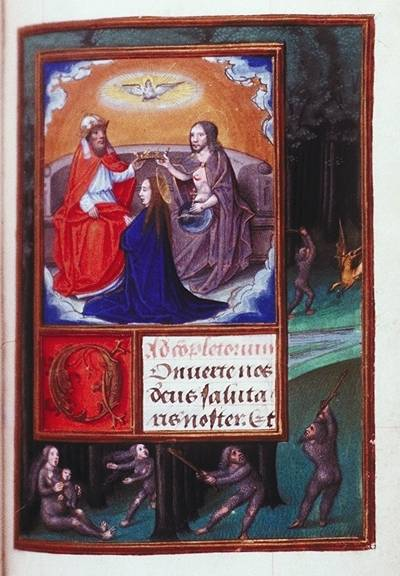
Conventional depiction of the Trinity, with Christ showing the wounds of his Passion

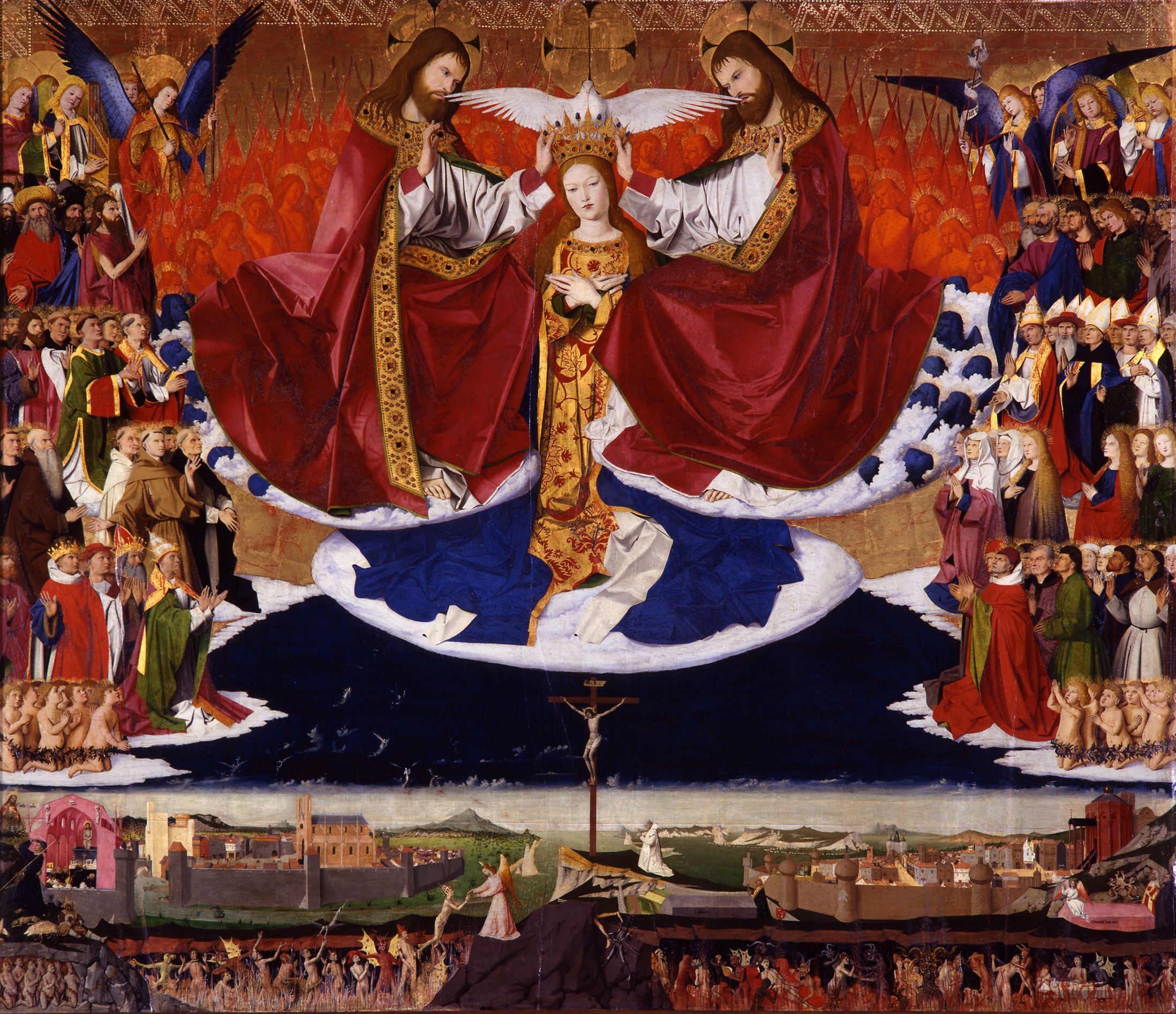
Enguerrand Quarton with Christ and God the Father as identical figures, as specified by the cleric who commissioned the work

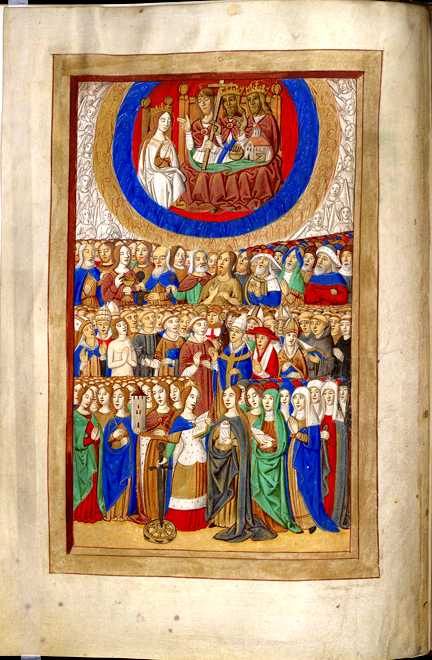
Page from Book of Hours, with three human figures for the Trinity

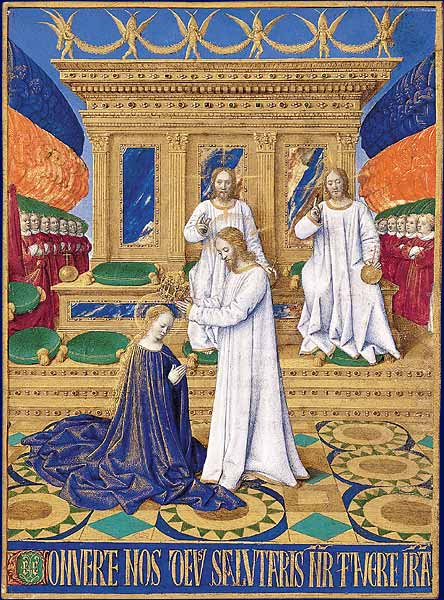
Jean Fouquet, also with three human figures, in this case three identical depictions of Jesus

=== Post-1500 ===
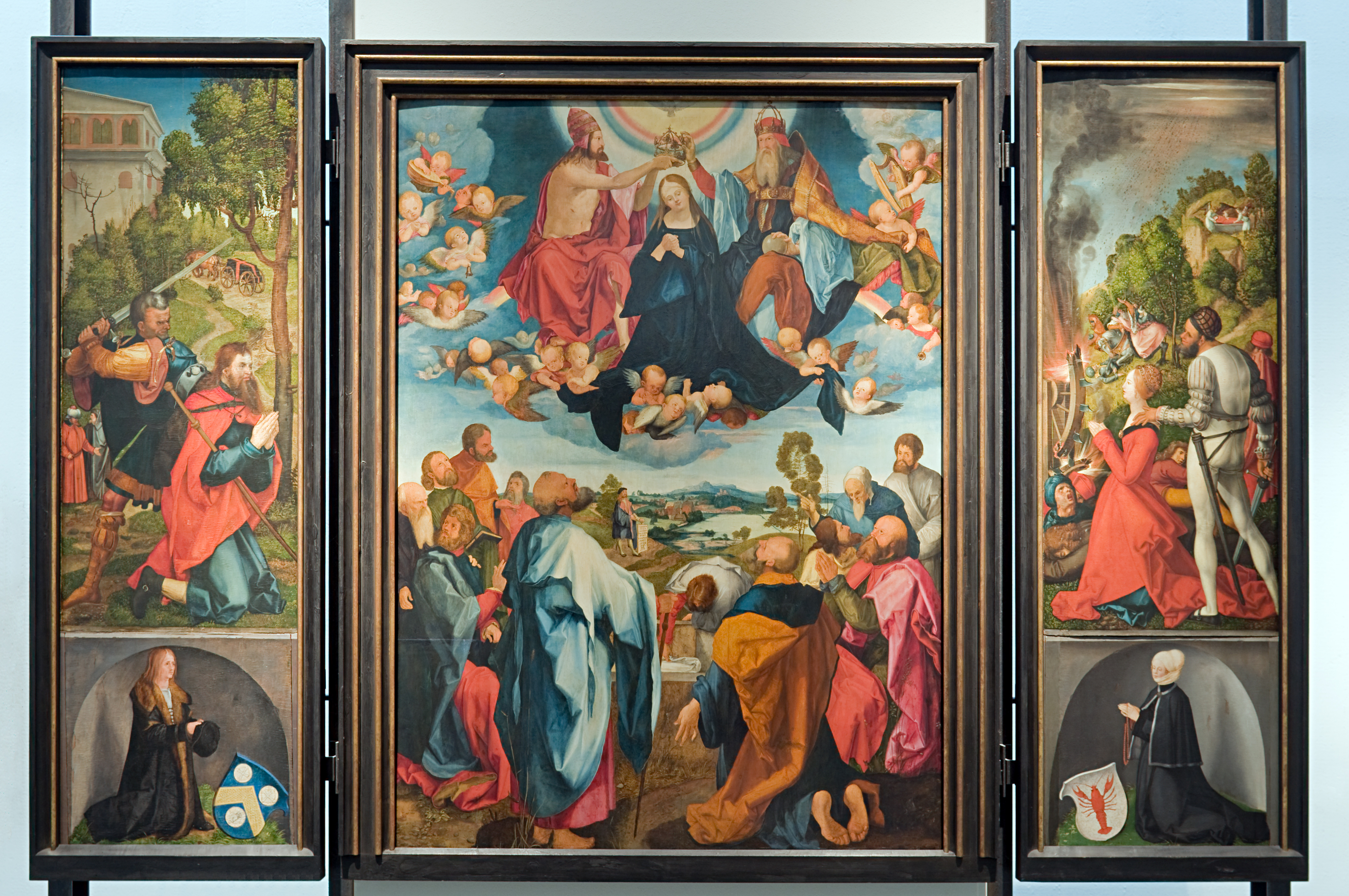
Albrecht Dürer combines the subject with an Assumption

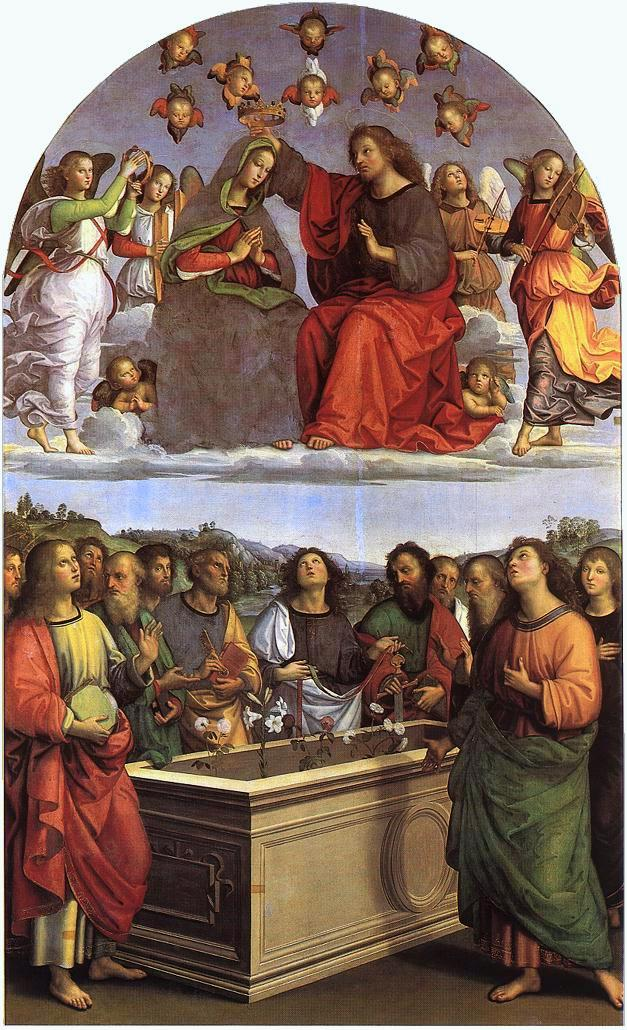
Raphael, 1502–1504

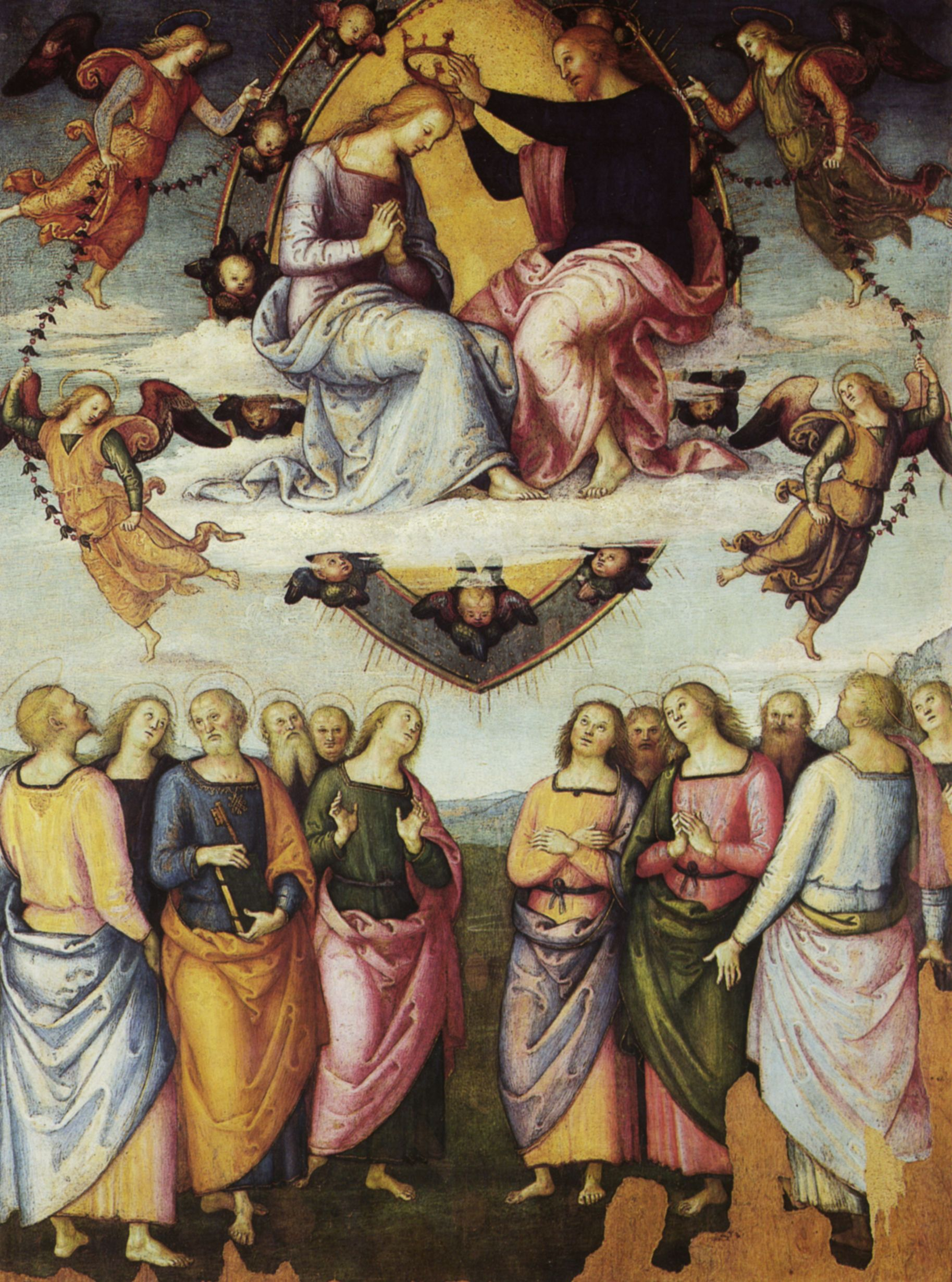
Pietro Perugino, 1504

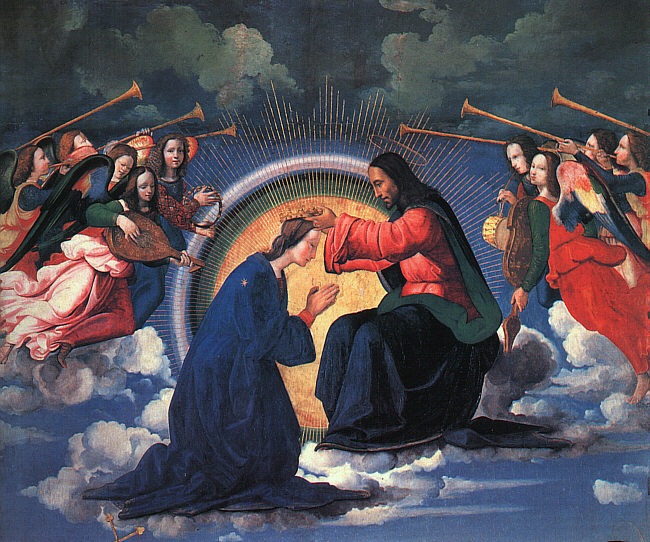
Ridolfo Ghirlandaio, 1504

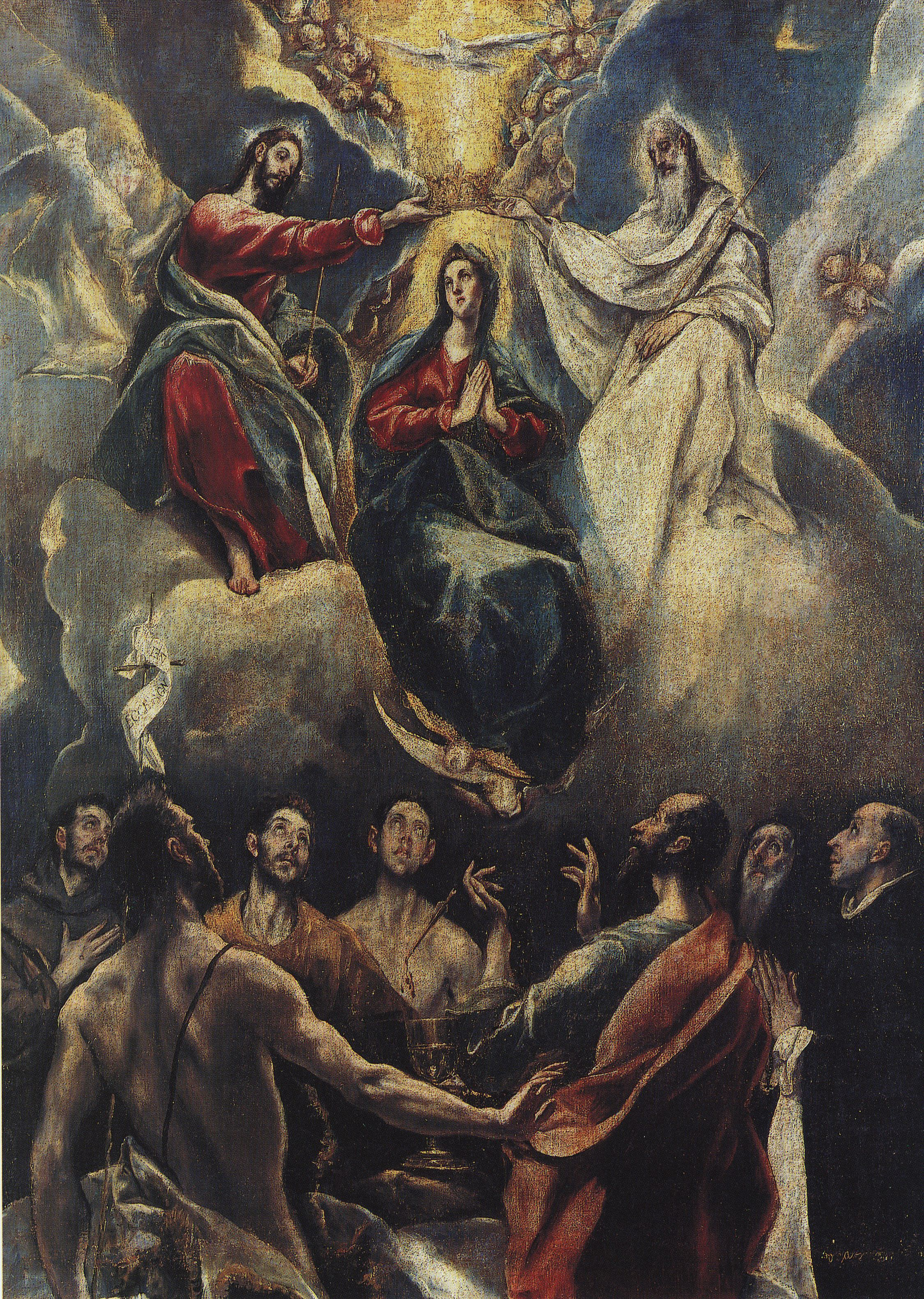
El Greco 1591

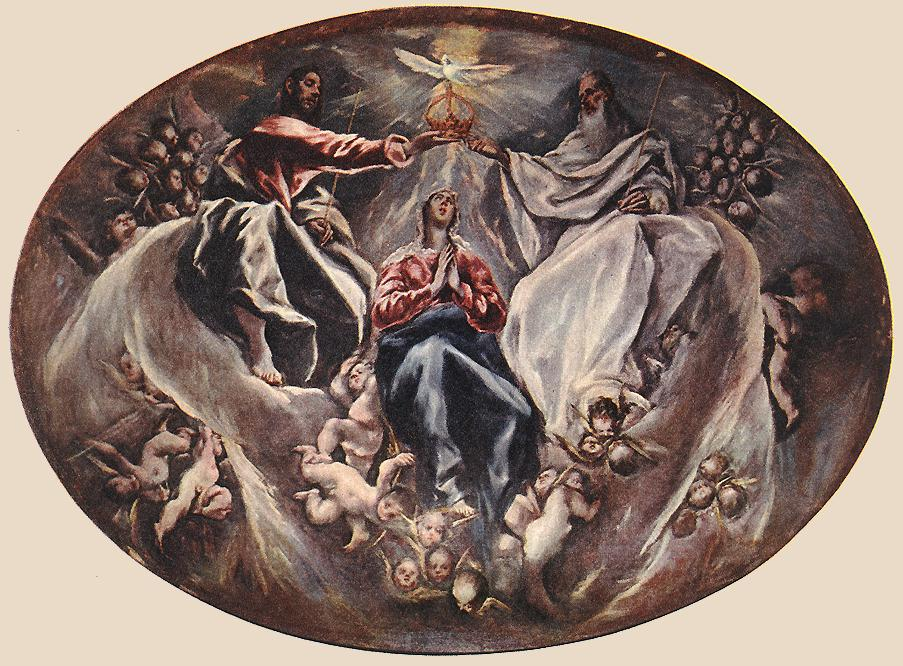
El Greco, 1597

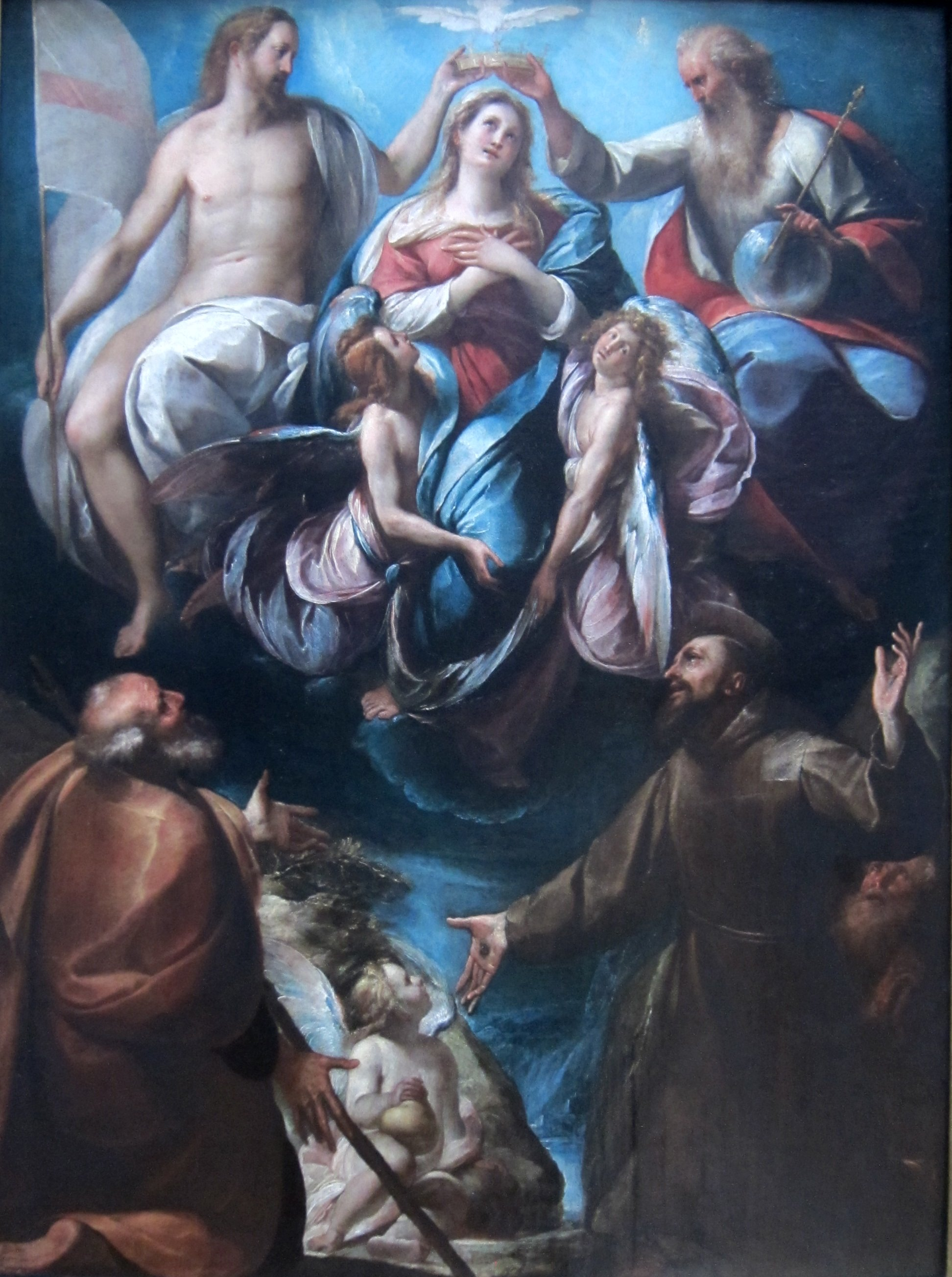
Giulio Cesare Procaccini, c. 1604–1607

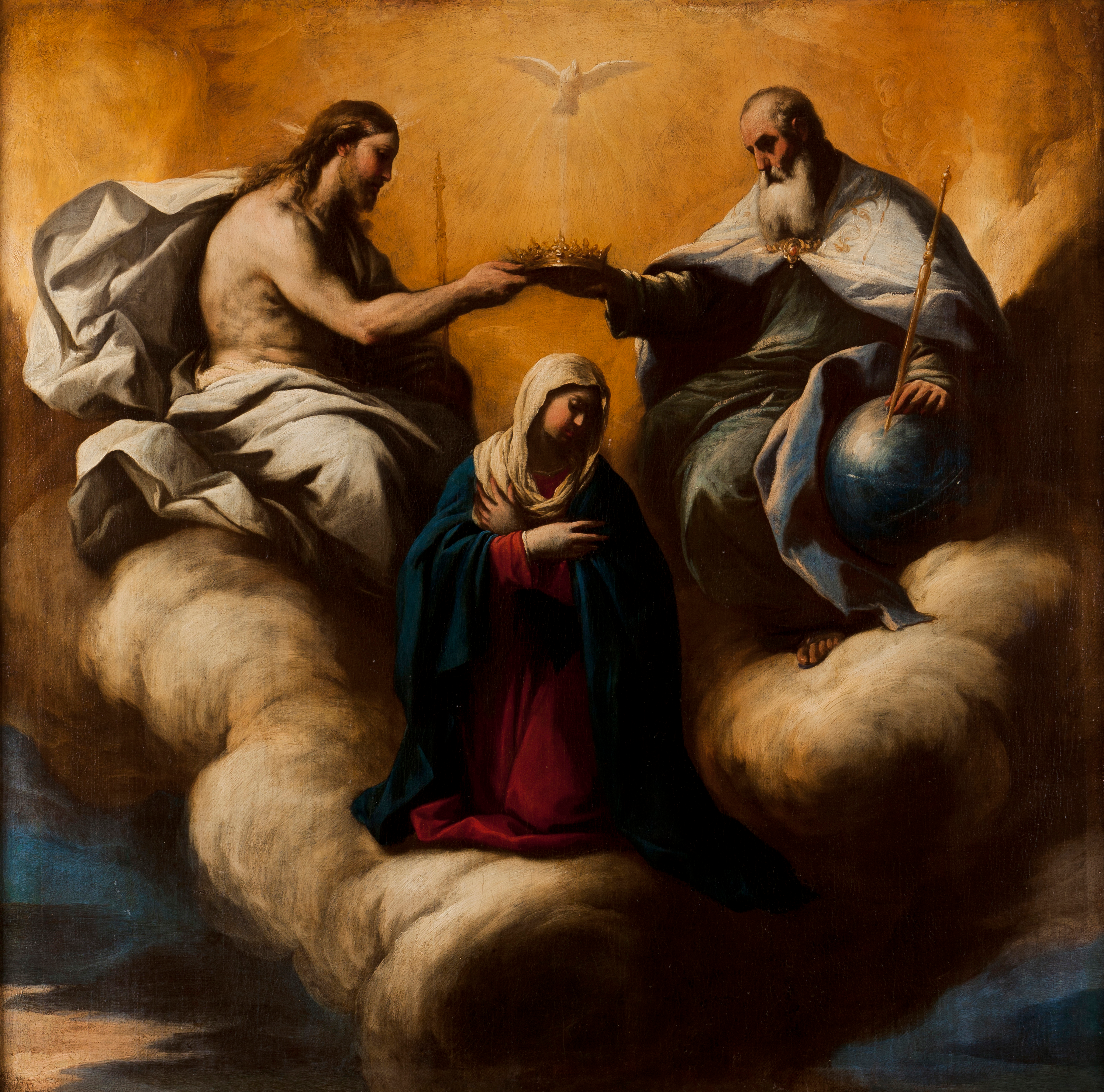
Attributed to Amaro do Vale, c. 1615–1619

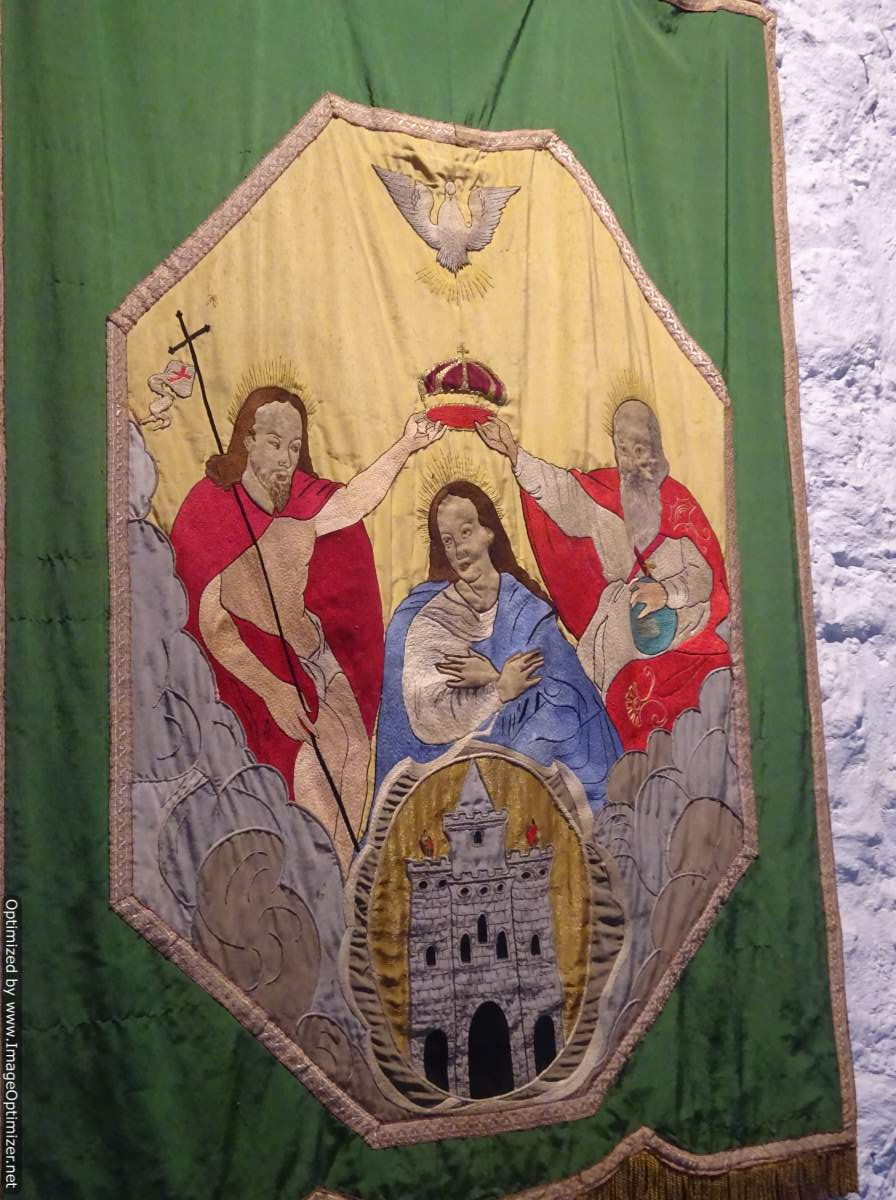
Banner of the Irish Catholic Confederation (1642–1652)

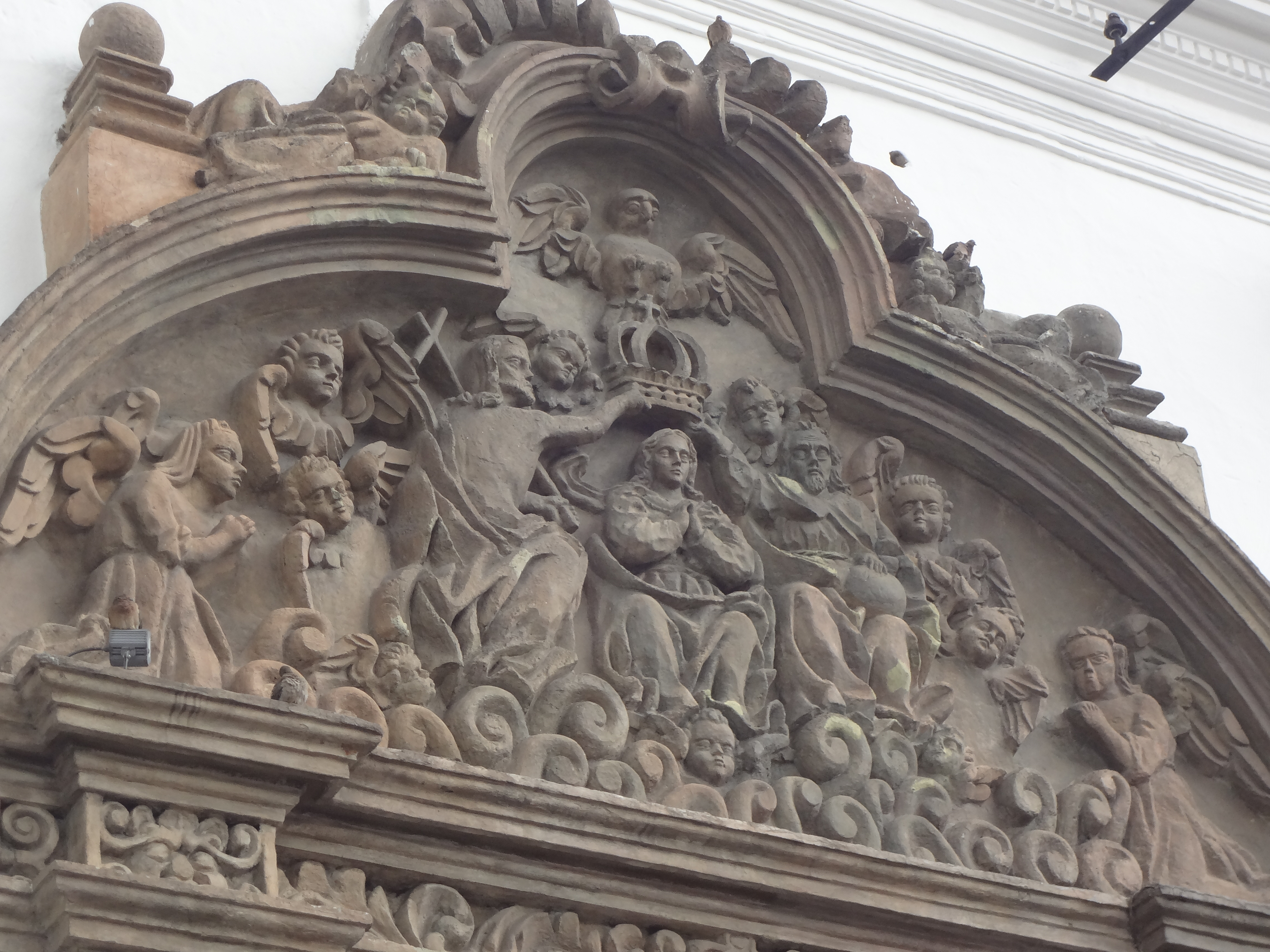
Tympanum on the north portal of the church of Santa Clara Monastery in Quito, Peru.

=== Post-1800 ===
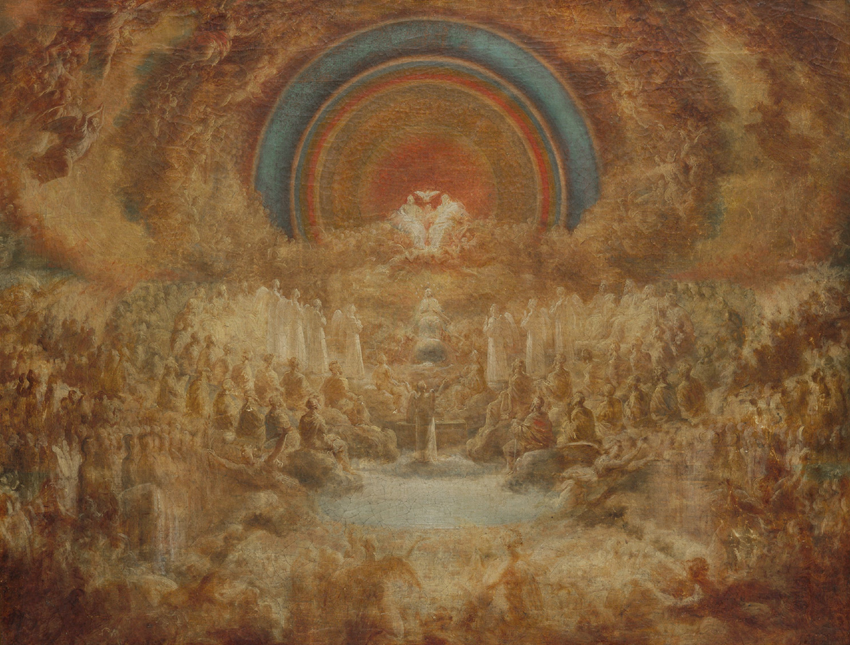
Domingos Sequeira, c. 1830

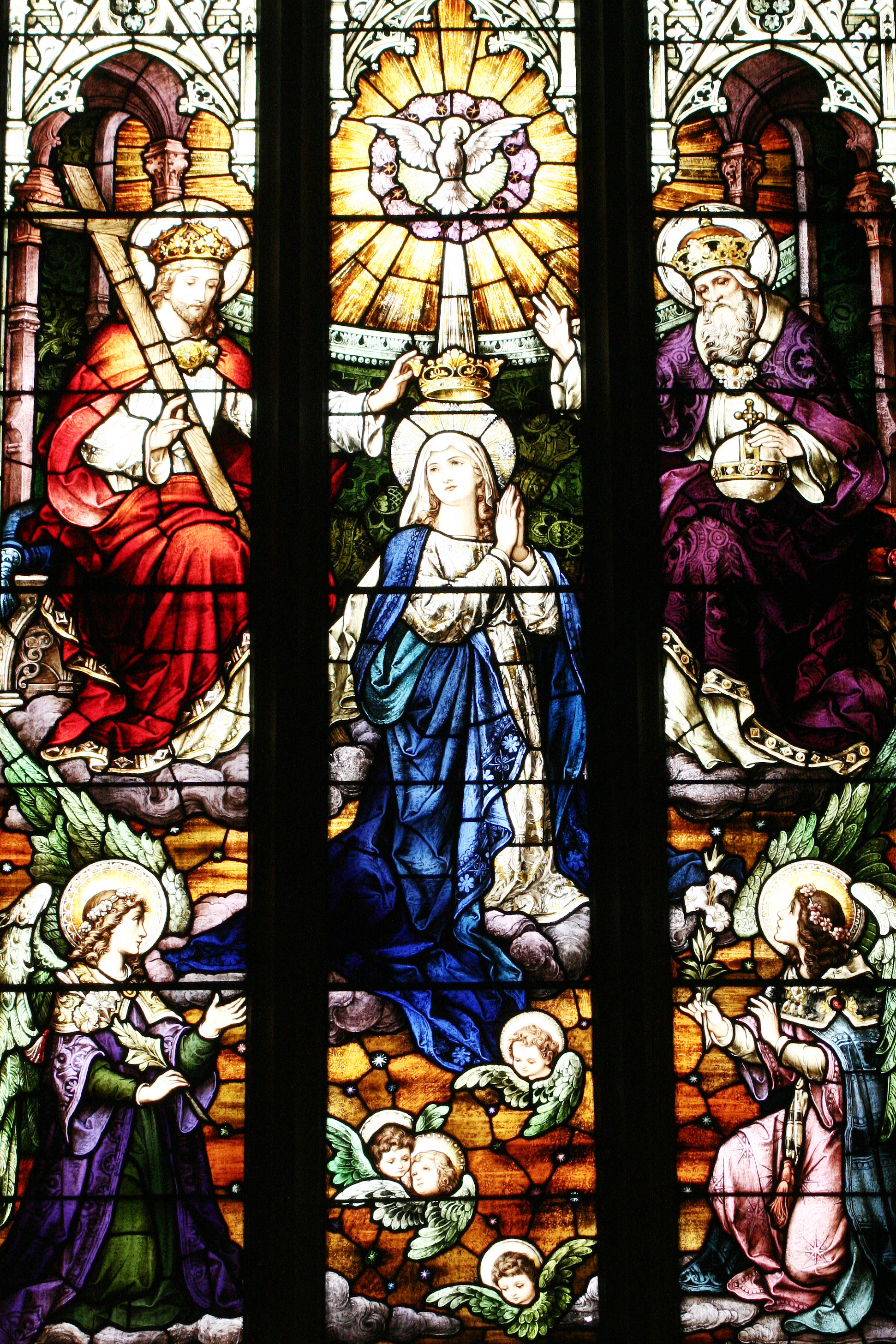
Stained glass window at St. Michael's Cathedral (Toronto) depicts Coronation of the Virgin.

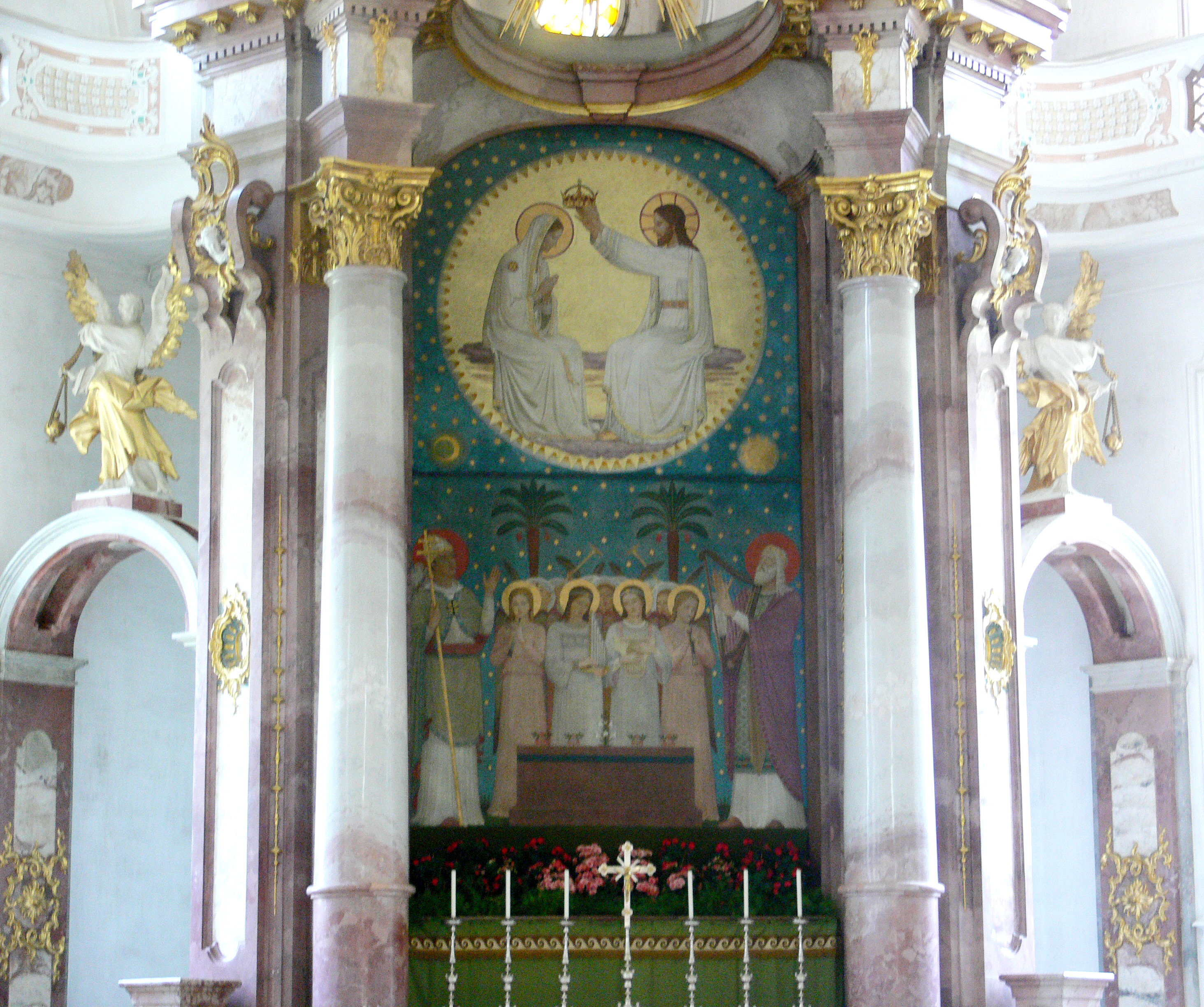
19th-century German altar

== See also ==
- Marian art in the Catholic Church
- Blessed Virgin Mary
- Canonical Coronation
- Queen of Heaven
