= Coronation of the Virgin (Rubens) =

Painting by Peter Paul Rubens

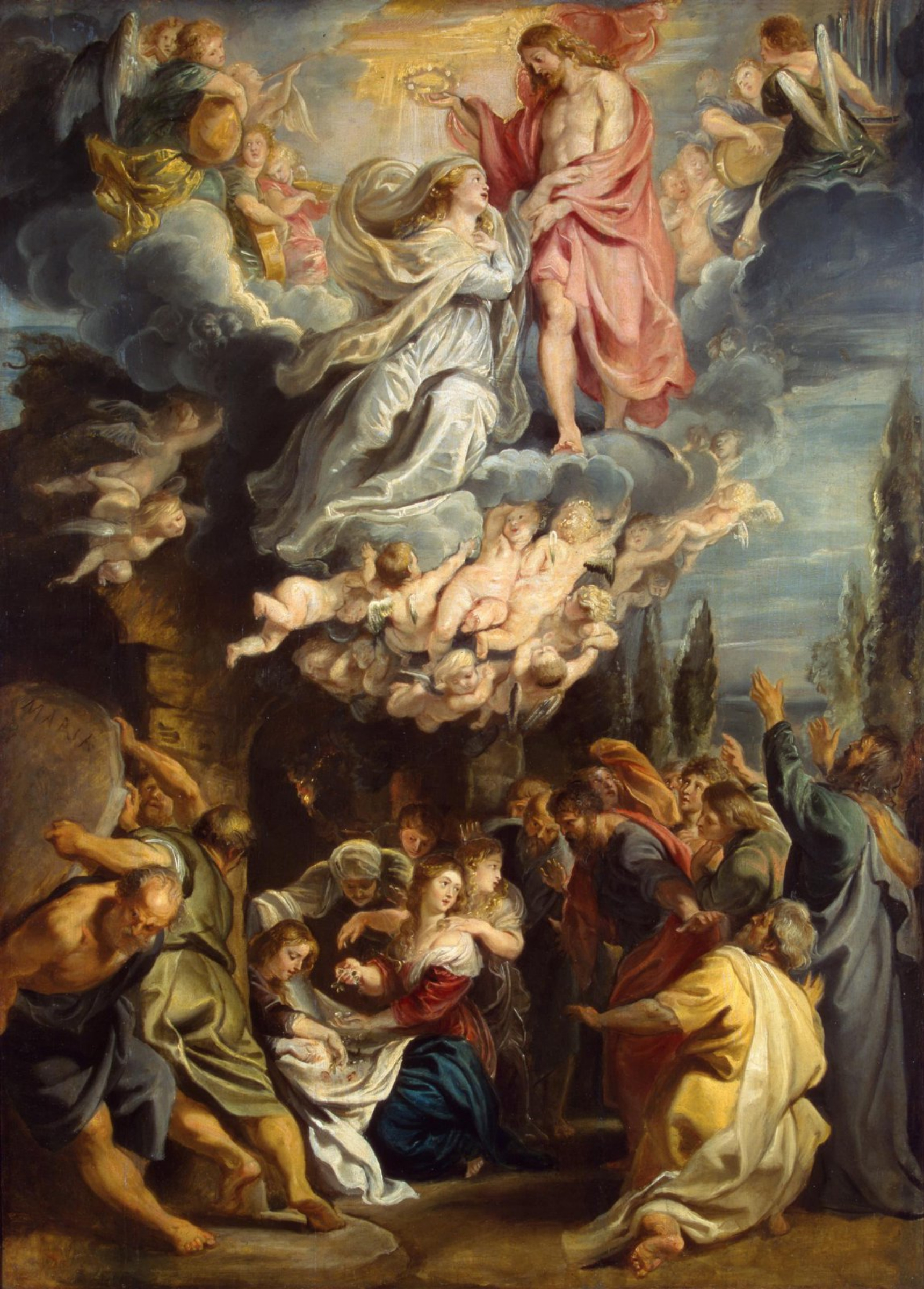
Coronation of the Virgin (1609–1611) by Rubens

Coronation of the Virgin is a 1609-1611 oil sketch by Peter Paul Rubens, produced as a proposal for a side-chapel in Antwerp Cathedral but rejected in March 1611 and never realised as a full work, instead being reworked later for the same chapel as Assumption of the Virgin. It is now in the Hermitage Museum, in Saint Petersburg, for which it was acquired in 1722 from the F.I. Dufferin collection. It was transferred from a panel to a canvas support in 1868.

The work combines motifs from the Coronation and Assumption of Mary as suggested by the Jesuit writer Ieronimo Nadal, even basing the upper part of its composition on an engraving in that author's 1595 work Annotationes et Meditationes in Evangelia This work and another oil sketch of the same subject are both now in the Hermitage Museum. A third oil sketch for a different Coronation of the Virgin was in the Kaiser-Friedrich-Museum in Berlin until 1945, when it was destroyed.
