= Coronation of the Virgin (Velázquez) =

Painting by Diego Vélazquez

The Coronation of the Virgin
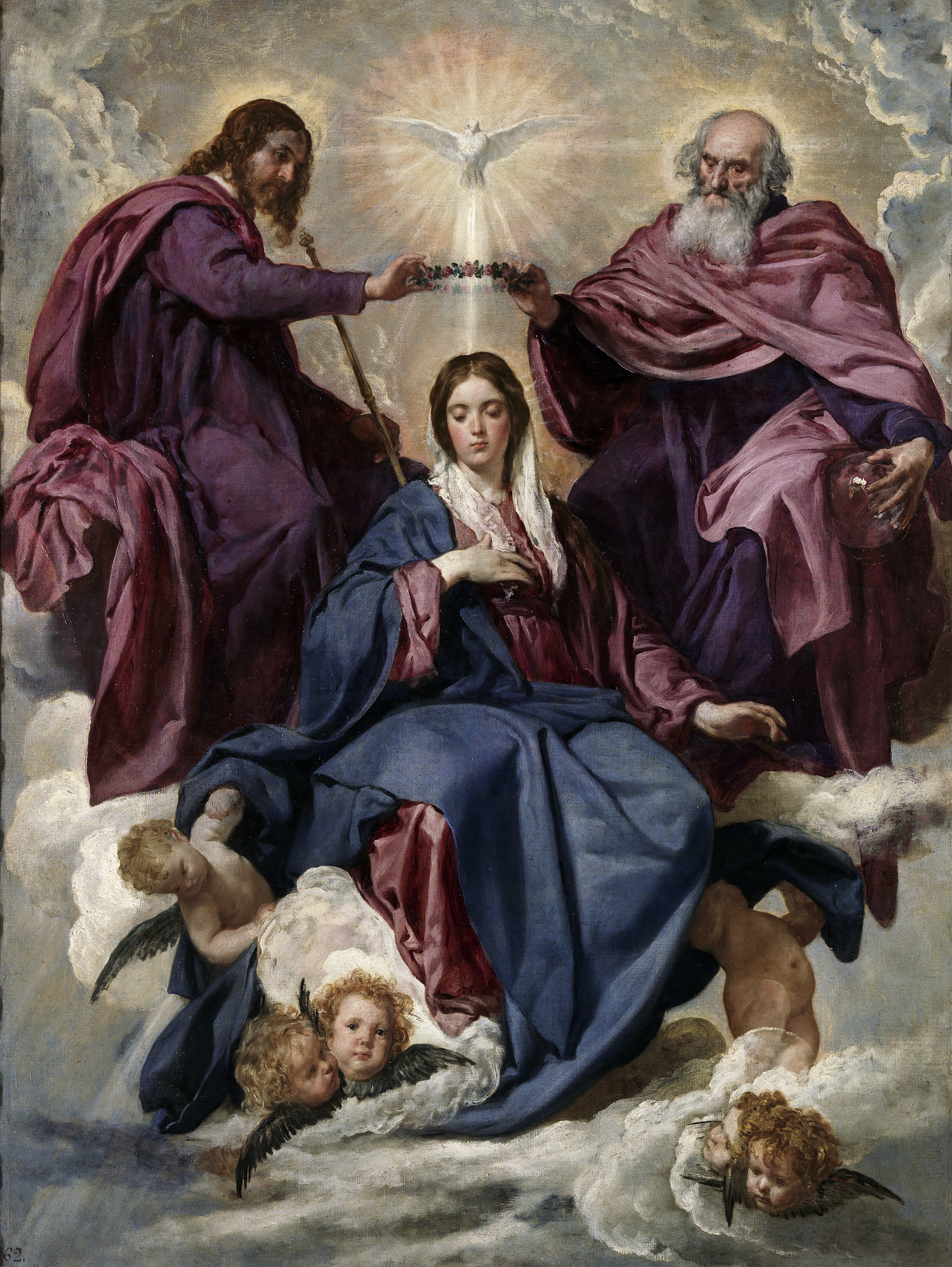
- Artist: Diego Velázquez
- Year: 1641-1644
- Medium: Oil on canvas
- Dimensions: 176 cm × 124 cm (69 in × 49 in)
- Location: Museo del Prado, Madrid

The Coronation of the Virgin is a 1635–1636 painting on oil on canvas by Diego Velázquez of the Holy Trinity crowning the Blessed Virgin Mary, a theme in Marian art. It is now at the Museo del Prado.

It was probably commissioned for the oratory of the court of Elisabeth of France, queen consort to Philip IV of Spain, in the Real Alcázar of Madrid. There it joined others on Marian religious festivities by the Naples painter Andrea Vaccaro which had been brought to Madrid by cardinal Gaspar de Borja y Velasco. The model for Mary may be the same as he used for the Rokeby Venus.

== Description ==
Velázquez's coronation of the Virgin is well-known for being a rare religious work by an artist better known for his portraits, and for the air of naturalness and simplicity not found in works by other Baroque religious painters. Its composition is based on an inverted triangle, giving a sense of great equilibrium and harmonious lines and reminiscent (both in its colour and form) of a heart. The main figure is the Virgin Mary, with a modest, reverential, and emotional expression, lowered eyes, a straight nose and curved lips. The sense that the inverted triangle is meant to refer to a heart is reinforced and the viewer's piety invoked by Mary pointing to her own heart.

To the viewer's right is God the Father, represented as a dignified old man, whilst to the left is the long-haired figure of Jesus Christ - together they hold Mary's crown above her head. In the centre the Holy Spirit is represented in the form of a white dove. The figures' heads and the dove are level, on the line of the triangle's base, representing their equality within the Holy Trinity. Also notable are the cherubs round the Virgin at the base of the painting - their pictorial quality rivals that of Murillo, famous for his cherub-themed works.

Velázquez uses mainly blues and violets, and as carmines (especially Venetian carmine) instead of traditional reds following the advice of his tutor Pacheco as written down in his book Arte de la Pintura, despite Velázquez already being an acclaimed artist by the time of producing this painting.

== Model ==
Noting the resemblance of the model in these paintings, the art historian José López-Rey wrote in 1999 that "obviously, Velázquez worked in both cases, and, for that matter, in the Fable of Arachne and Arachne, from the same model, the same sketch, or just the same idea of a beautiful young woman. Yet, he put on canvas two different images, one of divine and the other of earthly beauty". However, Neil MacLaren does not endorse these suggestions; they would probably argue that the painting was not produced in Italy. The Prado "Coronation" is dated to 1641–42; the present image is "stretched" vertically compared with the original.

== See also ==
- List of works by Diego Velázquez

== Sources ==
- The Coronation of the Virgin, Museo del Prado
- Justi, Carol. Diego Velazquez and His Times. Forgotten Books, 2018. ISBN 1333985479
- López-Rey, José. Velázquez: Catalogue Raisonné. Taschen, Wildenstein Institute, 1999. ISBN 3-8228-6533-8
- MacLaren, Neil; revised Braham, Allan. The Spanish School, National Gallery Catalogues. National Gallery, London, 1970. pp. 125–9. ISBN 0-947645-46-2
