= Coronation of the Virgin (Beccafumi) =

Painting by Domenico Beccafumi

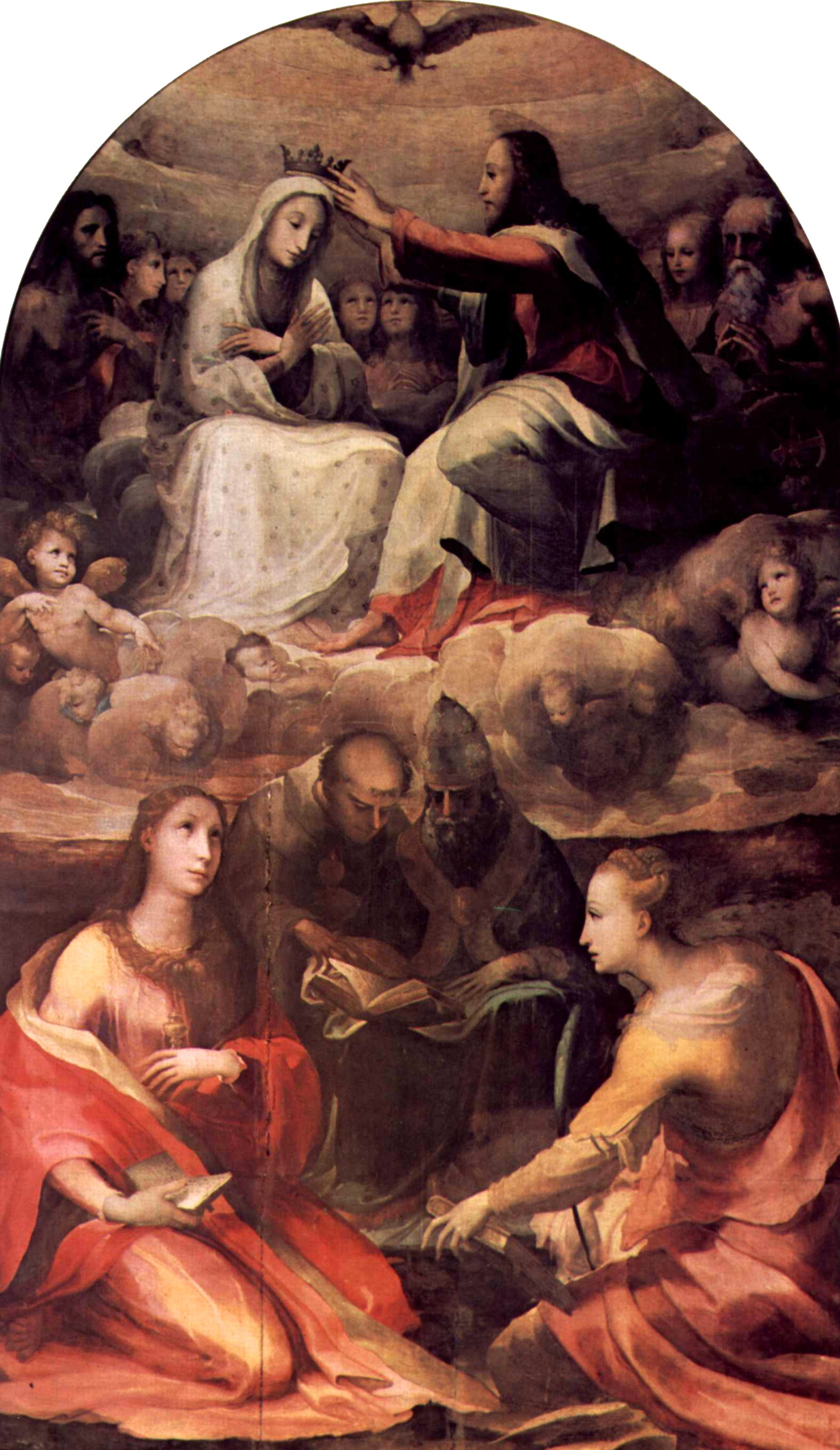
Coronation of the Virgin (c. 1539) by Domenico Beccafumi

Coronation of the Virgin is an oil-on-canvas painting executed c. 1539 by the Italian Renaissance painter Domenico Beccafumi, now in the Pinacoteca nazionale in Siena.

Commissioned by the monks of Ognissanti in Siena, it was moved to Santo Spirito church after that church was destroyed and was only recently moved to the gallery. Unusually for the subject, its lower register shows not the apostles but three saints and a pope, namely Mary Magdalene, Anthony of Padua, Pope Gregory XI and Catherine of Alexandria.

== Description and style ==
As often happens, the scene is set on two registers. In the upper one, a semicircular audience of saints forms the backdrop to the coronation of Mary by the hands of Christ, under the blessing of the dove of the Holy Spirit. A cloud of cherubs serves as the base and everything is set to give a sense of depth resolved in a hemicycle, which recalls works by Raphael (such as the Disputa del Sacramento).

In the lower part, however, there are not the usual apostles, but a group of saints, including Mary Magdalene, Anthony of Padua, Pope Gregory XI (the pope who listened to Catherine of Siena) and Catherine of Alexandria. They are busy, in a complex game of references of gestures and glances, verifying in the Holy Scriptures the fulfillment of the prophecies and the glorification of the Virgin in the kingdom of heaven. These are figures that echo other paintings of the time, from Michelangelo to Rosso Fiorentino, although they have a diaphanous appearance typical of Beccafumi's art.
