= Coronation of the Virgin Altarpiece =

Painting by Moretto da Brescia

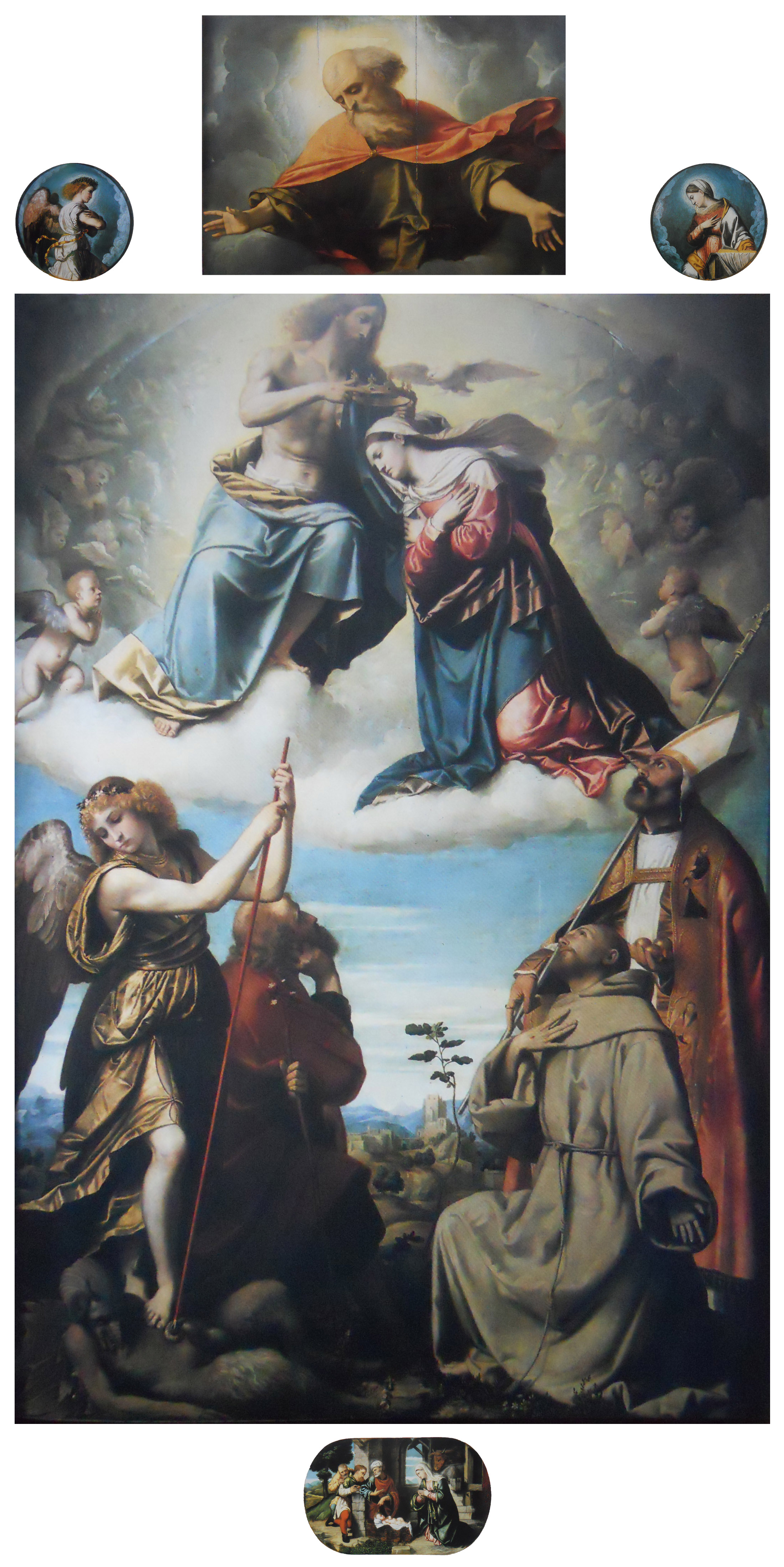
Reconstruction of the work

The Coronation of the Virgin Altarpiece is a five panel work by Moretto da Brescia, executed c. 1534. Its central panel (Coronation of the Virgin with Saints Michael, Joseph, Francis of Assisi and Nicholas of Bari) and upper panel (God the Father) are still in the church of Santi Nazaro e Celso in Brescia, whilst the two upper roundels (Gabriel and Virgin Mary, forming an Annunciation) and predella (Adoration of the Shepherds) are in the same church's rectory.
